= Bosque (disambiguation) =

A bosque is a forested area that forms on the flood plains of a river or stream; typically in the southwestern United States, from a Spanish word for woodlands.

Bosque may also refer to:

== Business, media and entertainment ==
- Bosque (journal), a scientific forestry journal published by the Southern University of Chile
- Bosque (programming language), designed and developed by Microsoft
- "Bosque", a 2022 song by No Money Enterprise featuring Bently, Vita and Redback

== Places ==
- Bosque River, Texas, U.S.
- Bosque County, Texas
- Bosque, New Mexico, Valencia County, U.S.
- Bosque School, a preparatory school in Albuquerque, Bernalillo County, New Mexico, U.S.

== Other uses ==
- Bosques de las Lomas, a section of Mexico (City), D.F., United Mexican States
- Ulmus parvifolia 'UPMTF', a Chinese Elm cultivar sold under the marketing name Bosque

== See also ==
- Bosquentin, France
- Bosquet, a formal plantation of trees
- Buskett Gardens, a woodland area in Malta
- El Bosque (disambiguation)
- Basque (disambiguation)
