= BASC =

BASC may refer to:

- Berkeley APEC Study Center
- Berlin Air Safety Centre
- British Association for Shooting and Conservation
- Bronchioalveolar stem cell
- Bulacan Agricultural State College, Philippines
- Business Alliance for Secure Commerce

== See also ==
- Bachelor of Applied Science (BASc)
- Bachelor of Arts and Science (BASc)
- BACS (disambiguation)
- Bask (disambiguation)
- Basque (disambiguation)
