= Bask =

Bask may refer to:

- to bask, or to sunbathe
- Bask, Gilan, Iran; a village
- Kalle Bask, a Finnish sailor
- Bask (horse) (1956–1979), an Arabian stallion
- Bask Om, a fictional character from Zeta Gundam
- A fictional king (and the area he reigned) from Mario Tennis Aces.
- Bäsk, a Swedish liquor
- FK BASK (ФК БАСК), a soccer team in Belgrade, Serbia
- Bask Bank, a U.S. online-only banking division.
- Bask Technology, a U.S. tech support company

== See also ==
- Bask, Iran (disambiguation), for places primarily spelled "Besk" but also spelled "Bask"
- Pulin Bihari Baske (born 1968), Indian politician
- Michael Baskes, a U.S. engineer
- BASC (disambiguation)
- Basque (disambiguation)
