= WBO (disambiguation) =

The World Boxing Organization is one of the four major boxing organizations.

WBO may also refer to:

- Wimbledon Chase railway station, the station code WBO
- Waraana Bilisummaa Oromoo, an armed movement in Ethiopia
- World Bamboo Organization, an international coordinating body for bamboo practitioners
- World BASC Organization, a nonprofit organization created in 2002 to facilitate and speed up international trade
