= Bacs (disambiguation) =

BACS is the Bankers Automated Clearing Services, a scheme for the electronic processing of financial transactions.

BACS or Bács may also refer to:

== Organisations ==
- Bay Area Christian School, in League City, Texas, US
- Boston Archdiocesan Choir School, in Cambridge, Massachusetts, US
- British Association of Canadian Studies, a group for scholarly studies of Canadian culture
- Black American Cinema Society

== Other uses ==
- Bács-Bodrog County, a county in the Habsburg Kingdom of Hungary from the 18th century to 1918
- Bács-Kiskun County, a county in Hungary, created from Bács-Bodrog and Pest-Pilis-Solt-Kiskun counties after World War II
- Bač, Serbia or Bács
- Bacterial artificial chromosomes, a DNA construct

== See also ==
- Bacsik, a surname (including a list of people with the name)
- BAC (disambiguation)
- BASC (disambiguation)
