= Besk =

Besk or variant, may refer to:

== Places ==
- Besk, Khoshab, Razavi Khorasan Province
- Besk, Sabzevar, Razavi Khorasan Province
- Besk, Torbat-e Heydarieh, Razavi Khorasan Province

== Other uses ==
- BESK (Binär Elektronisk SekvensKalkylator, "Binary Electronic Sequence Calculator"), early Swedish computer

== See also ==
- Nowy Besk (New Besk), Gmina Grabów, Łęczyca County, Łódź Voivodeship, Poland; a village
- Bäsk, a Swedish style spiced liquor flavored with wormwood
- Bask, Gilan, Iran; a village
- Bask (disambiguation)
