= El Bosque =

El Bosque may refer to:

== Places ==
- El Bosque, Chile, municipality within Greater Santiago
- El Bosque, Chiapas, municipality and township in southern Mexico
- El Bosque, Cádiz, in Andalusia, southern Spain
- El Bosque, Uruguay, coastal resort in Canelones Department
- El Bosque, Cuba, in Camajuaní, Villa Clara Province

== Universities ==
- El Bosque University, a university in Bogotá, Colombia

== Airports ==
- El Bosque Airport, an airport in El Bosque, Santiago, Chile
