= Bacsik =

Bacsik is a surname. Notable people with the surname include:

- Elek Bacsik (1926–1993), jazz violinist and guitarist
- Mike Bacsik (left-handed pitcher) (born 1977)
- Mike Bacsik (right-handed pitcher) (born 1952)

== See also ==
- Bacs (disambiguation)
