= West Berlin Air Corridor =

Airways linking West Berlin to West Germany

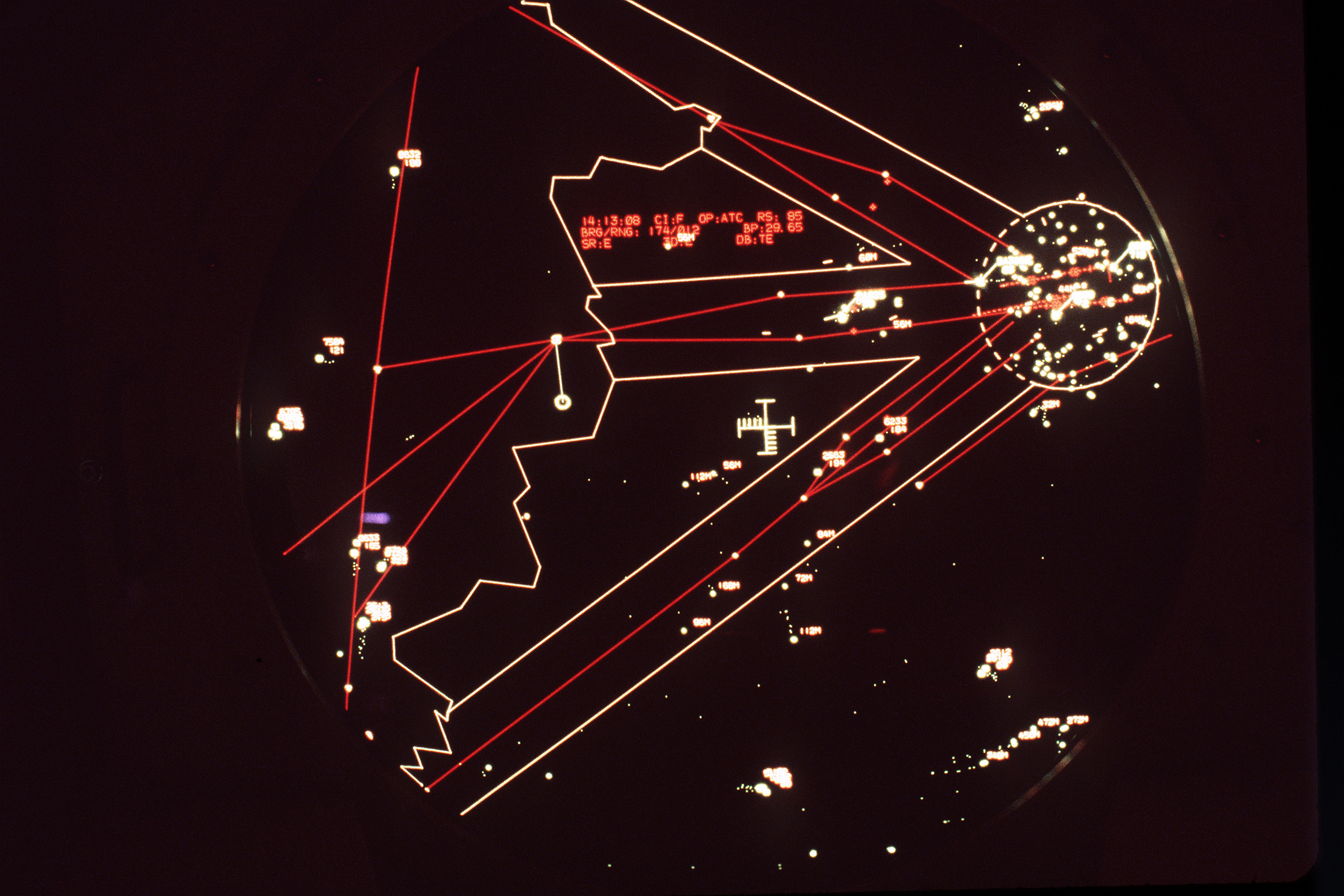
Three air corridors to West Berlin 1989 display of the Air Traffic Control at Tempelhof airport

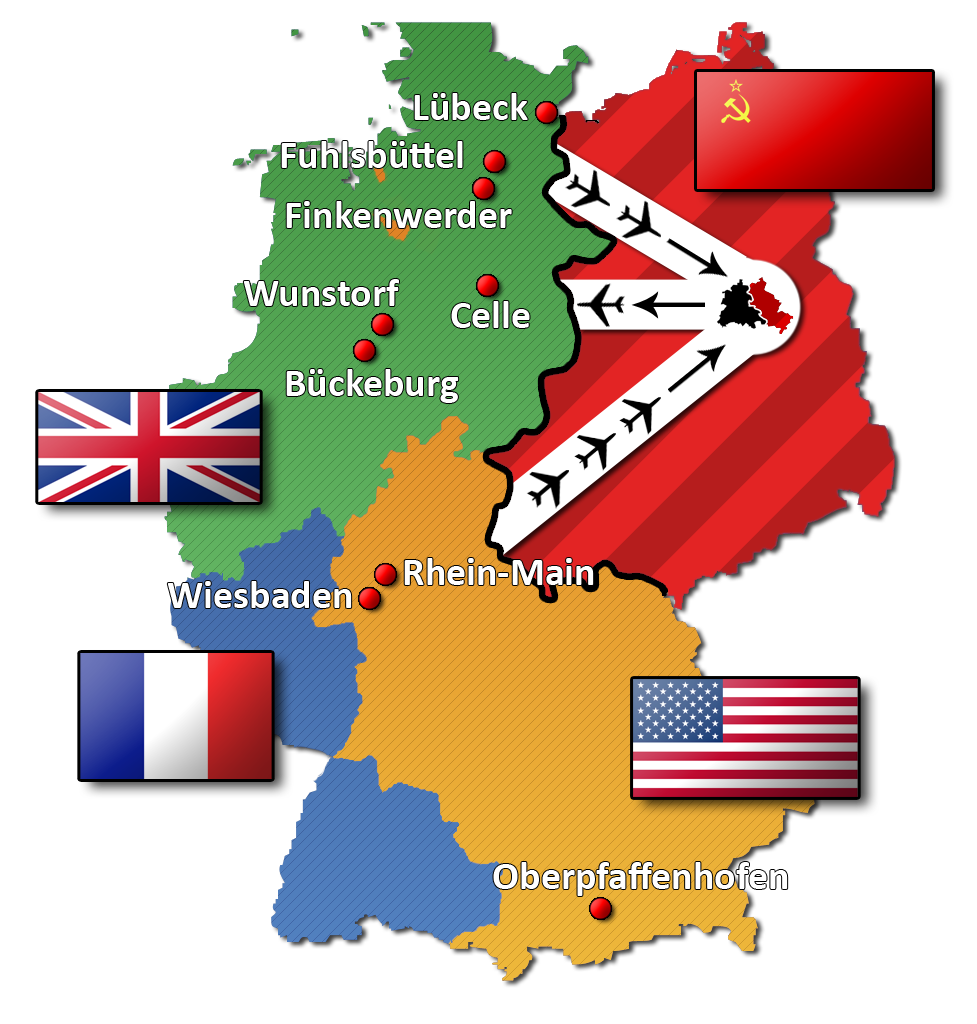
Map of three permissible West Berlin Air Corridors.

During the Cold War era (1945–1991), the West Berlin air corridors, also known as the Berlin corridors and control zone, were three regulated airways for civil and military air traffic of the Western Allies between West Berlin and West Germany passing over East Germany's territory. The corridors and control zone were physically centered on and under control of the all-Allied Berlin Air Safety Centre (BASC) in West Berlin. The airspace within these corridors was used by US, UK and French-registered non-combat aircraft belonging to these countries' armed forces and airlines operated by pilots holding those countries' passports. In addition, it was also used by LOT Polish Airlines for regular scheduled services from Warsaw to London and Paris via Schönefeld Airport to the south of East Berlin.

== History ==
The air corridors connected the three West Berlin airports of Tempelhof, Tegel and Gatow with other airfields/airports. Each air corridor was only 20 mi (32 km) wide, while the circular-shaped control zone had a 20 mi (32 km) radius, making it 40 mi (64 km) in diameter; thus allowing aircraft room to manoeuvre for weather and take-off and landing. Aircraft were compelled to fly at a maximum height of 10,000 ft (3,048 m). (Note: the cruising altitude of propliners employed on the Berlin Airlift) However, on occasion, the height restriction would be raised to 13,000 ft (3,962 m) in order to accommodate Soviet military exercises. Flight plans, for entry into an air corridor, were handled by the Berlin Air Safety Centre (BASC), who in turn would coordinate with the Berlin Air Route Traffic Control Centre (BARTACC).

=== Routes ===
- Northern air corridor: Hamburg, Bremen, Northern Europe
- Centre air corridor: Hanover, Düsseldorf, Cologne/Bonn, Western Europe
- Southern air corridor: Frankfurt, Stuttgart, Munich, Nuremberg, Southern Europe

=== Operating procedures ===
Contemporary air traffic control procedures prohibited overtaking in the air corridors to ensure a safe operating environment inside these narrow air lanes and to prevent aircraft from accidentally straying into East German airspace. This compelled jet aircraft crews to reduce their speed if the preceding aircraft was a slower-flying piston or turboprop plane. This in turn extended the jet's flying time inside the air corridor and resulted in higher operating costs due to increased fuel consumption at 10,000 ft (3,050 m), especially on short-haul internal German services covering a maximum distance of 300 mi (480 km).

For commercial and operational reasons, the airlines had their flights routed through the centre corridor whenever possible as this was the shortest of the three air corridors, thereby minimising the time aircraft spent cruising at 10,000 ft (3,000 m). At such a low altitude, modern jet aircraft could not attain an efficient cruising speed. This extended flight times and increased fuel consumption. Therefore, use of the centre air corridor was the most economical option.

== Accidents and incidents ==
- On 5 April 1948, a British European Airways Vickers 610 Viking 1B (registration: G-AIVP) operating that day's scheduled flight from Northolt via Hamburg to Berlin collided during its approach to RAF Gatow head-on with a Soviet Air Force Yakovlev Yak-3 fighter, which was performing aerobatics in the area at that time. As a result of the collision, the Viking spiralled out of control and crashed 1.9 mi (3.1 km) from the airport on East German territory with the loss of all 14 lives (four crew, ten passengers) on board the aircraft. The Soviet fighter pilot was killed in the accident as well. The subsequent investigation established the Soviet fighter pilot's action, which contravened all accepted rules of flying and the quadripartite flying rules to which Soviet authorities were parties, as the cause of the accident.
- On 29 April 1952, an Air France Douglas C-54A (registration F-BELI) operating an internal German scheduled service from Frankfurt Rhein-Main Airport to Berlin Tempelhof Airport came under sustained attack from two Soviet MiG-15 fighters while passing through one of the Allied air corridors over East Germany. Although the attack had severely damaged the plane, necessitating the shutdown of engines number three and four, the pilot in command of the aircraft managed to carry out a safe emergency landing at Tempelhof Airport. A subsequent inspection of the aircraft's damage at Tempelhof revealed that it had been hit by 89 shots fired from the Soviet MiGs during the preceding air attack. There were no fatalities among the 17 occupants (six crew, eleven passengers) despite the severity of the attack. The Soviet military authorities defended this attack on an unarmed civilian aircraft by claiming the Air France plane was outside the air corridor at the time of attack.
- On 15 November 1966, Pan Am Flight 708, a Pan Am Boeing 727-21 (registration N317PA) nicknamed “Clipper München” operating the return leg of the airline's daily cargo flight from Berlin to Frankfurt Rhein-Main Airport was due to land that night at Tegel Airport, rather than Tempelhof, due to runway resurfacing work taking place at that time at the latter. Berlin Control had cleared flight 708 for an ILS approach to Tegel Airport's runway 08, soon after the crew had begun its descent from FL030 (3,000 ft) before entering the southwest air corridor over East Germany on the last stretch of its journey to Berlin. The aircraft impacted the ground near Dallgow, East Germany, almost immediately after the crew had acknowledged further instructions received from Berlin Control, just 10 mi (16 km) from Tegel Airport. All three crew members lost their lives in this accident. Visibility was poor, and it was snowing at the time of the accident. Following the accident, the Soviet military authorities in East Germany returned only half of the aircraft's wreckage to their US counterparts in West Berlin. This excluded vital parts, such as the flight data recorder, the cockpit voice recorder as well as the plane's flight control systems, its navigation and communication equipment. The subsequent National Transportation Safety Board investigation report concluded that the aircraft's descent below its altitude clearance limit was the accident's probable cause. However, the NTSB was unable to establish the factors that had caused the crew to descend below its cleared minimum altitude.

== Notes and citations ==
Notes

Citations
