= Berlin Air Safety Centre =

Post-WW2 German institution

The Berlin Air Safety Centre (BASC) was established by the Allied Control Council's Coordinating Committee on 12 December 1945. It was located in the former Kammergericht Building, on Kleistpark, West Berlin. Operations began in February 1946 under quadripartite flight rules Paragraph 4. Paragraph 4 of the rules begins: "The Berlin Air Safety Centre has been established in the Allied Control Authority Building with the object of ensuring safety of flights for all aircraft in the Berlin area. BASC regulates all flying in the Berlin control zone and also in the corridors extending from Berlin to the boundaries of adjacent control zones."

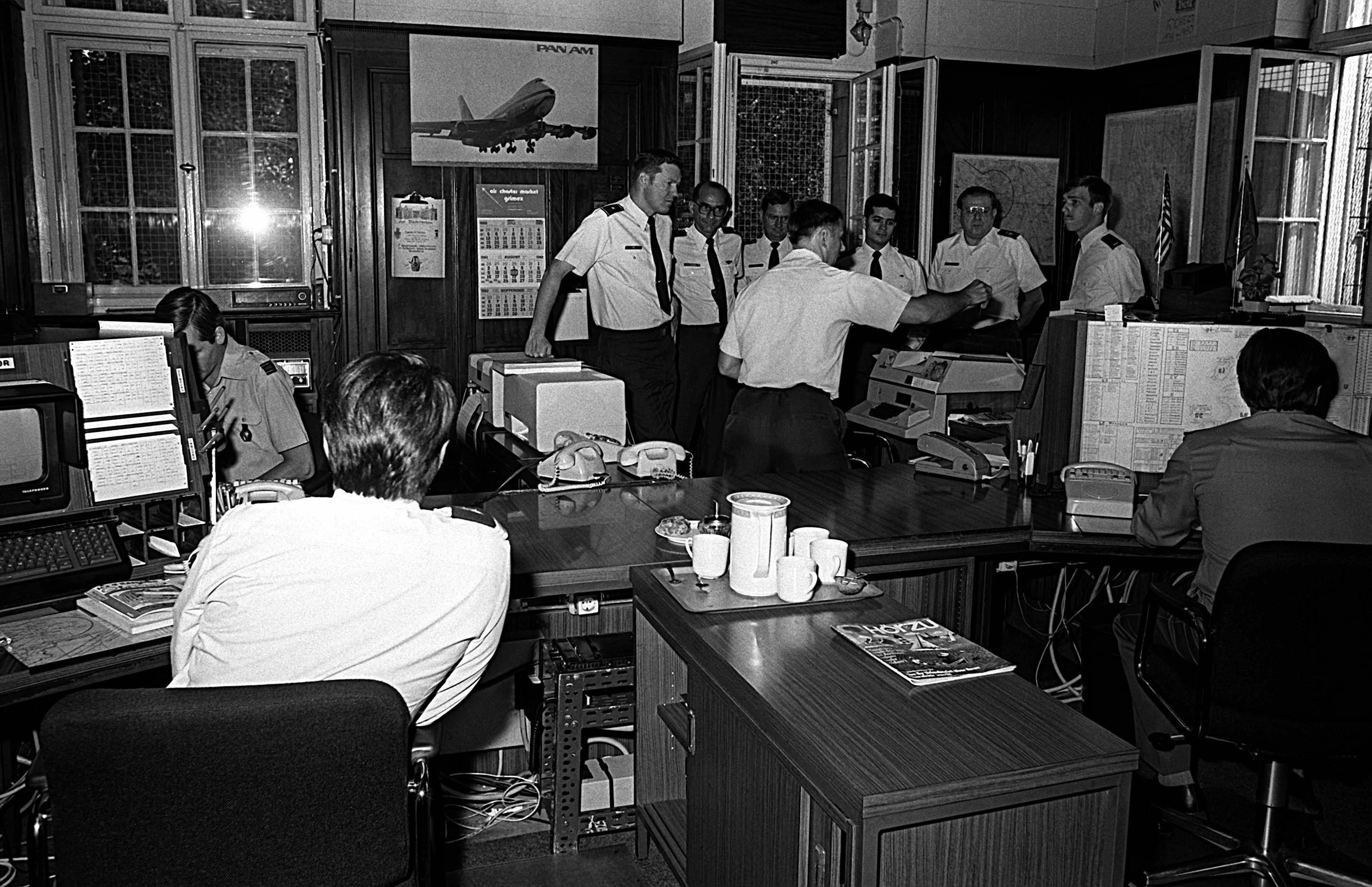
The Four-Power's controller desks, located in the Berlin Air Safety Centre.

The BASC was one of two Four-Power Authorities to continue functioning following the onset of the Cold War, the other being Spandau Prison, which ceased operations following the death of Rudolf Hess on 17 August 1987. The BASC continued to ensure safety of flight, for 24 hours a day, with the three western powers being represented by a chief controller, along with a deputy and general duty controller; all were Air Force officers. The Soviets, in attempt to mitigate being out numbered, had both a controller and an interpreter on duty until its closing on 31 December 1990, following the lapse of Allied responsibilities in Berlin.

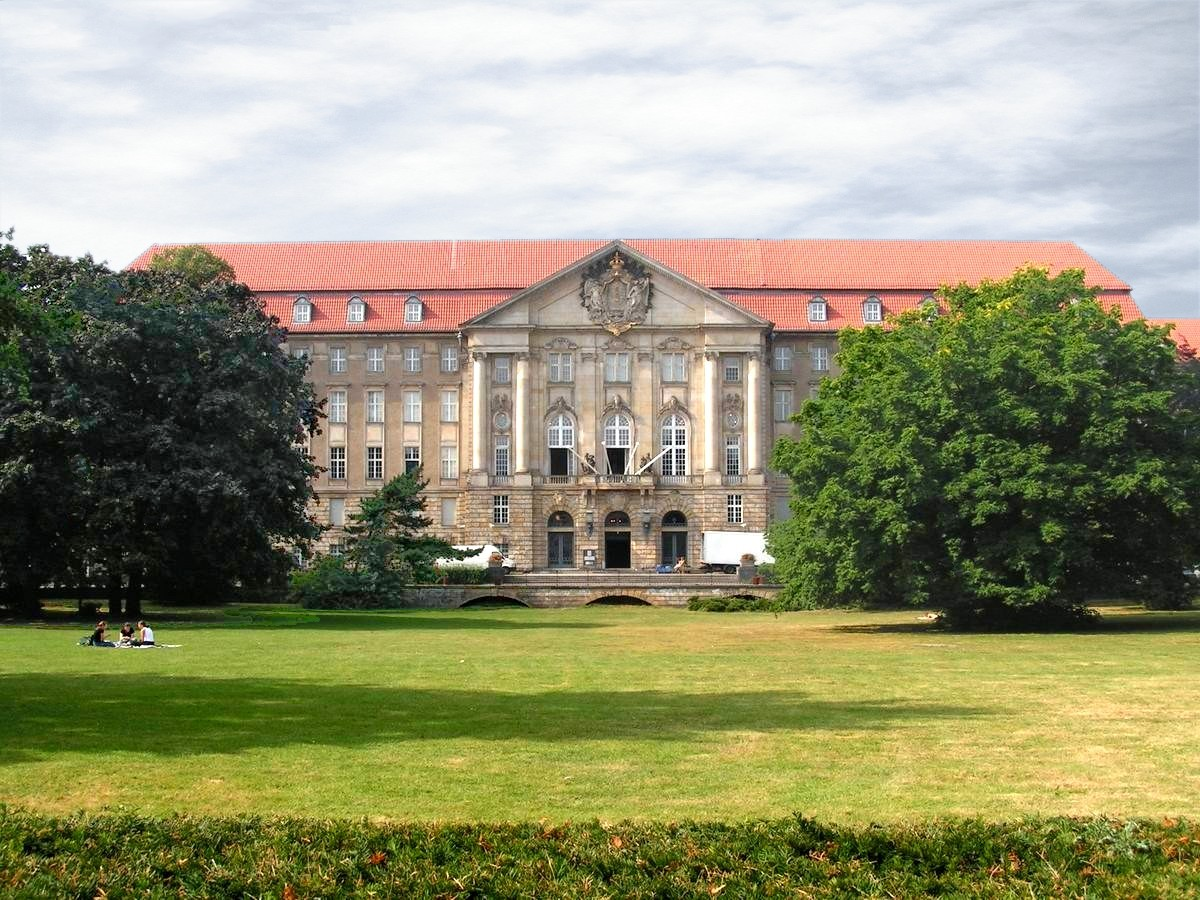
The Kammergericht building, location of the Berlin Air Safety Centre.

The BASC coordinated air traffic in and out of Berlin and was responsible for air safety in the three corridors established in 1946 as well as in the Berlin control zone, the airspace within a 20 mi (32 km) radius of a pillar located in the cellar of the Allied Control Authority building. Each of the three corridors were 20 mi (32 km) wide and linked Berlin with the Western Zones of Occupation of Germany (later West Germany).

The three corridors were usually open, without restriction, only to the Four Power nations: United Kingdom, United States, France and USSR – other nations wishing to use the corridors had first to request and obtain permission from the BASC. Requests to use the southern corridor were handled by the US desk, the centre corridor by the French desk, and the northern corridor by the UK desk. The requests were then handed to the USSR desk for coordination, with Soviet air defense authorities, and in turn would be stamped in one of three ways: permission granted, safety of flight guaranteed; permission granted, safety of flight not guaranteed; or permission denied.

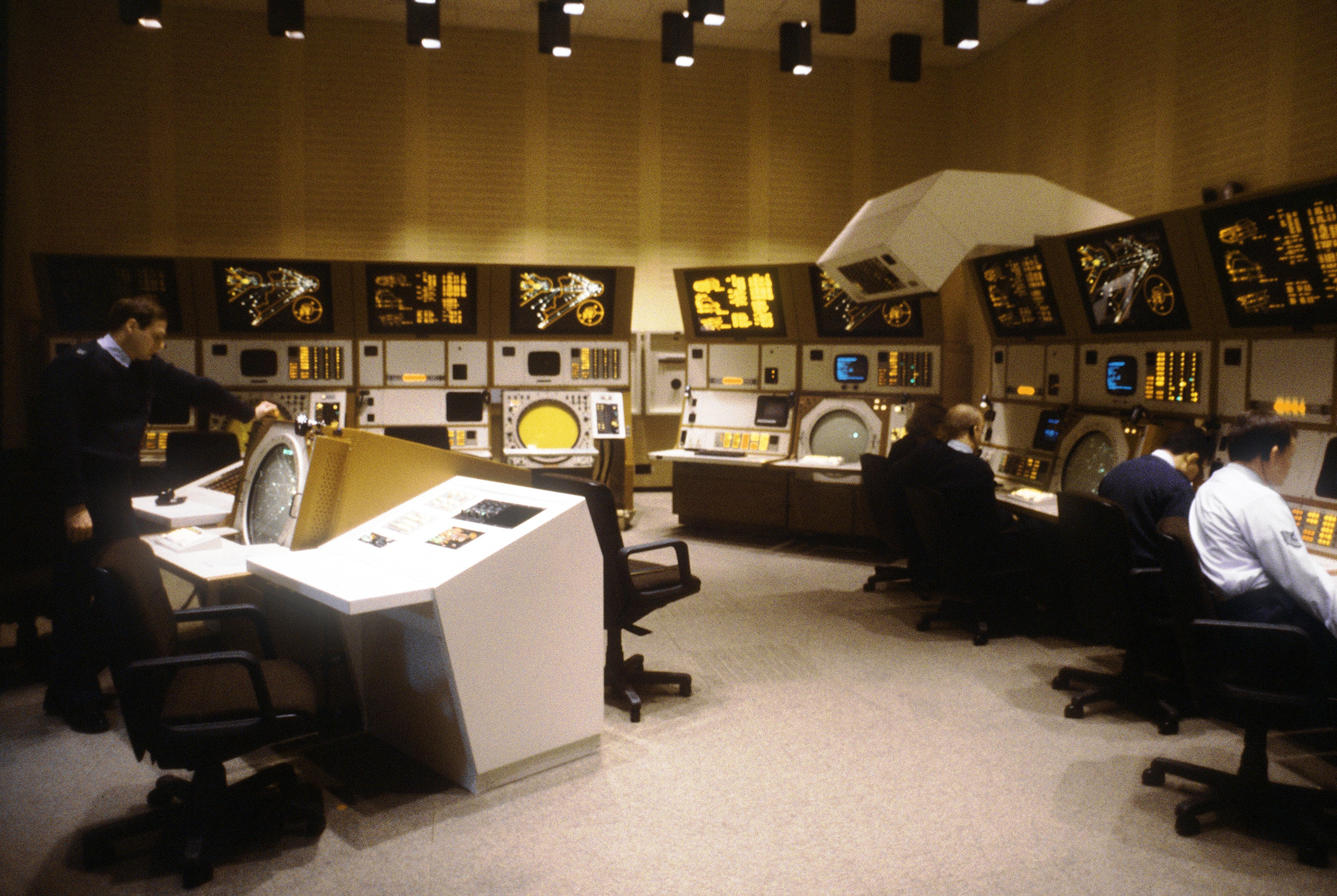
The Berlin Air Route Traffic Control Centre (BARTCC) in 1987.

Coordinating closely with the Berlin Air Route Traffic Control Centre (BARTCC) facilities at Tempelhof Air Base, BASC personnel were responsible for logging protests of infringements upon Allied air corridors, and fielded the political ramifications of Eastern Bloc defectors escaping into West Berlin by aircraft. Tensions reached an understandable high during the Berlin Airlift in 1948–49, during which many fights broke out among controllers, though the success of the campaign was in large part due to the coordination carried out within the BASC.
