= Black American Cinema Society =

African-American association

The Black American Cinema Society (BACS) was an association that promoted African American actors and filmmakers, notably through an annual awards night. Founded in 1976 by Mayme Clayton, it contained one of the largest archives of Black American films and research materials in the US. In 1997, it celebrated its 15th anniversary.
