= Basque =

Basque may refer to:

- Basques, an ethnic group of Spain and France
- Basque language, their language

== Places ==
- Basque Country (greater region), the homeland of the Basque people with parts in both Spain and France
- Basque Country (autonomous community), an autonomous region of Spain
- Northern Basque Country, in the western part of the Pyrénées-Atlantiques of France
- Southern Basque Country, both the Basque Autonomous Community and Navarre

== Other uses ==
- Basque (clothing), or old basque, an item of women's apparel
- Basque (grape), a white wine grape

== See also ==
- Basque cuisine, the cuisine of the Basque people
- Basque music, the music of the Basque people
- Basque conflict
- List of people from the Basque Country
- Port aux Basques (Port Basque), Newfoundland, Newfoundland and Labrador, Canada; a town district
- Bask (disambiguation)
- BASC (disambiguation)
