= El Bosque Airport =

El Bosque Airport Base Aérea El Bosque
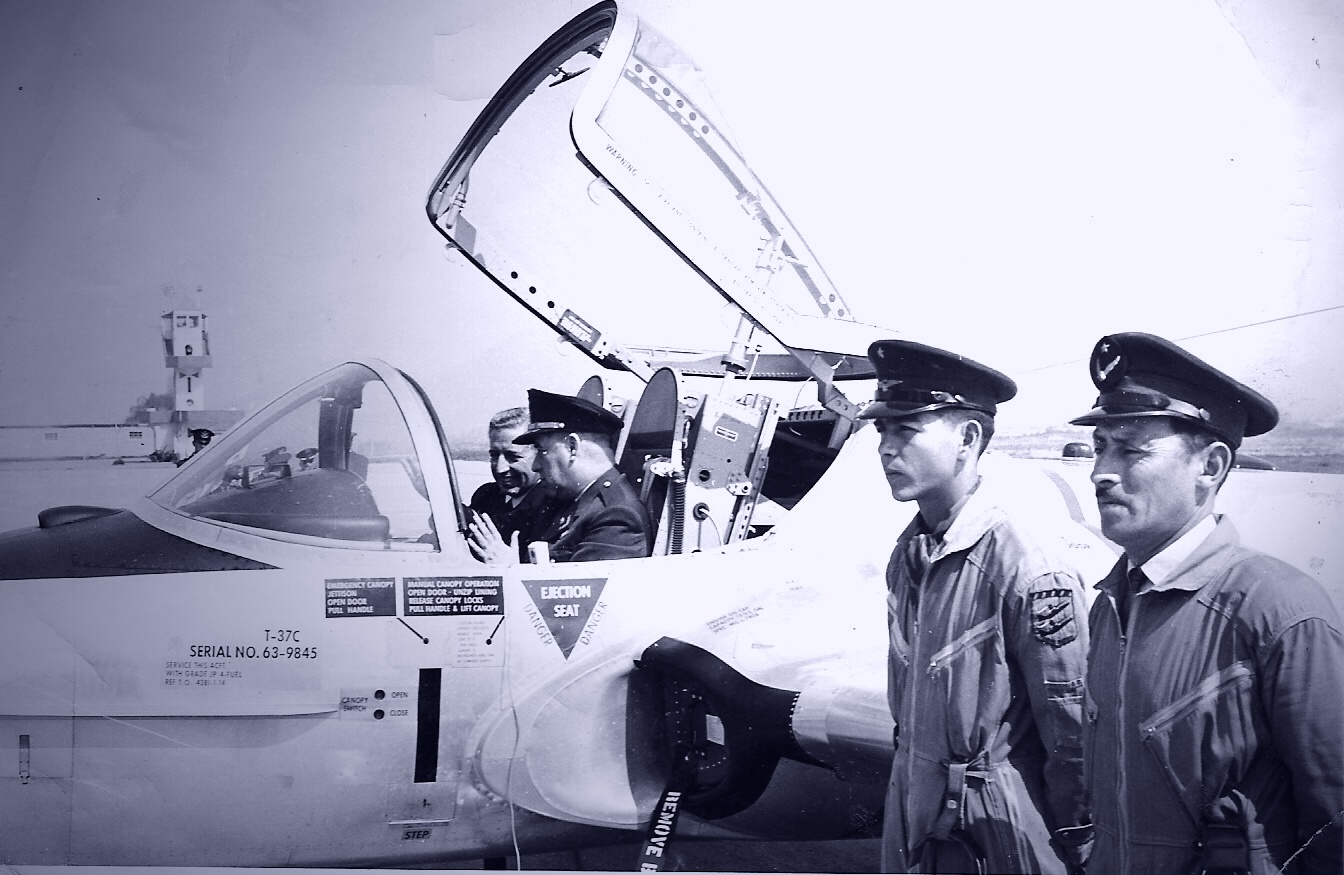
- El Bosque Air Base, 1965
- IATA: none; ICAO: SCBQ; LID: BQE

Summary
- Airport type: Military
- Owner/Operator: Chilean Air Force
- Serves: Santiago, Chile
- Location: El Bosque
- Elevation AMSL: 1,844 ft / 562 m
- Coordinates: 33°33′39″S 70°41′15″W

Map
- Location of El Bosque Airport in Chile

Runways
Direction	Length		Surface
Direction	m	ft	Surface
03/21	1,825	5,988	Concrete
- Sources: DGAC GCM Google Maps

El Bosque Airport (Spanish: Base Aérea El Bosque) (es) (ICAO: SCBQ), is a military airport located in El Bosque, a southern suburb of Santiago, Chile.

Runway 03 has an additional 250 metres (820 ft) displaced threshold. The El Bosque VOR-DME (Ident: BQE) is located on the field. There is distant high terrain northeast through southeast.

== See also ==
- Transport in Chile
- List of airports in Chile
