= Bosque (programming language) =

Programming language

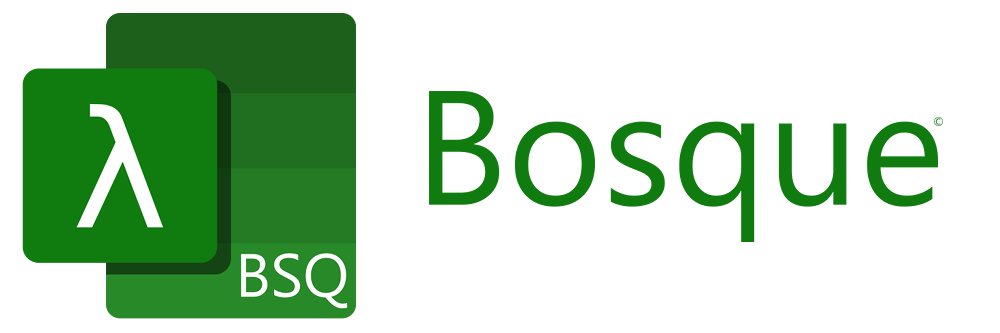
- Paradigm: Multi-paradigm: functional, typed
- Family: ECMAScript
- Designed by: Mark Marron
- Developer: Microsoft
- First appeared: March 3, 2019; 7 years ago
- License: MIT
- Filename extensions: .bsq
- Website: www.microsoft.com/en-us/research/project/bosque-programming-language/

Influenced by
- JavaScript, TypeScript, ML

Bosque is a free and open-source programming language designed and developed by Microsoft that was inspired by the syntax and data types of TypeScript and the semantics of ML and Node/JavaScript. Design goals for the language include better software quality and improved developer productivity.

== Overview ==
Bosque was designed by Microsoft Research computer scientist Mark Marron, who describes the language as an effort to move beyond the structured programming model that became popular in the 1970s.

The structured programming paradigm, in which flow control is managed with loops, conditionals, and subroutines, became popular after a 1968 paper titled "Go To Statement Considered Harmful" by computer scientist Edsger Dijkstra. Marron believes we can do better by getting rid of sources of complexity like loops, mutable state, and reference equality. The result is Bosque, which represents a programming paradigm that Marron, in a paper he wrote, calls "regularized programming."

The Bosque specification, parser, type checker, reference interpreter, and IDE support are licensed under MIT License and available on GitHub.

== Examples ==
=== Add two numbers ===
function add2(x: Int, y: Int): Int {
    return x + y;
}

add2(2, 3)     // 5
add2(x=2, y=3) // 5
add2(y=2, 5)   // 7

== See also ==
- Dafny
- F* (programming language)
- Free software movement
