= Michael Baskes =

American engineer

Michael I. Baskes
- Education: California Institute of Technology (BS); California Institute of Technology (PhD)
- Occupations: Materials scientist, engineer
- Known for: Embedded atom model Modified embedded atom method
- Awards: National Academy of Engineering (2012); DOE Basic Energy Science Hall of Fame; TMS Fellow (2004)
- Engineering career
- Significant design: Atomistic models for helium behavior in metals

Michael I. Baskes is an American engineer.

Baskes earned a degree in engineering from the California Institute of Technology in 1965, and remained at the institution through 1970 to pursue doctoral study in materials science. He worked at the Los Alamos National Laboratory for 29 years, until 2005, then started a teaching career. Baskes held an adjunct professorship at the University of California, San Diego, joined the faculty of Mississippi State University in 2013, and later moved to the University of North Texas as a distinguished research professor. He founded the journal Modelling and Simulation in Materials Science and Engineering in 1992 and remained the publication's chief editor until 2005.

Baskes was elected a fellow of The Minerals, Metals & Materials Society in 2004 "[f]or innovative research, choice of problems both for the scientific importance and career development of his many associates, attention to detail, the originality of thought, and clarity of presentations and generosity of ideas." The National Academy of Engineering granted Baskes member status in 2012, "[f]or contributions to the embedded atom method for predicting the structure and properties of metals and alloys."
