= Business Alliance for Secure Commerce =

Trade organization

The Business Alliance for Secure Commerce (BASC) is an international business alliance, created to promote secure international trade in cooperation with governments and international organizations. The current director of BASC is Fermín Cuza.

== History ==
BASC, which initially stood for Business Anti Smuggling Coalition, was created by Mr. Fermin Cuza in 1996, as a voluntary cooperation program between the private sector and the United States Customs Administration, in order to avoid using legal trade for smuggling and drug trafficking.

That same year a company based in Cartagena was the first one in South America to adopt the BASC program and was chosen by the US Customs to develop the BASC pilot plan.

The World BASC Organization -WBO-was created in 2002 in the U.S. state of Delaware, as a nonprofit organization, to facilitate and speed up international trade, by establishing global security standards and procedures to the logistic trade chain with the support of custom entities and government authorities.

== Standards & Requirements ==
BASC standards meet the requirements of other recognized initiatives.

1. Be a company or a person actively involved in logistics, production or service activities related to foreign trade or services.
2. Each company must be legally established and have commercial activities in the country, as well as overseas, that will permit the validation of the integrity of the firm and their partners and directors. Also, the company should not have any criminal record or considered to have by any national or foreign authorities a suspicious person and/or dubious legal or criminal reputation.
3. Comply with the registration process approved by each chapter according to the procedure set by the WBO.

== Membership ==
The world BASC is a recognized Industry Partnership Program with the U.S. Customs and Border Protection, and is recognized by several international Customs Organizations. Any company can become BASC Certified Company. The program works with:

- Colombia
- United States
- Mexico
- Ecuador
- Peru
- Panama
- Costa Rica
- Argentina
- Chile
- El Salvador
- Venezuela
- Dominican Republic
- Honduras (in process)
