= Fritz Kolbe =

German diplomat and resistance member

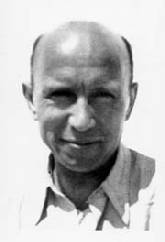
- c. 1946–1947
- Born: 25 September 1900; Berlin, German Empire
- Died: 16 February 1971 (aged 70); Bern, Switzerland
- Organization: Foreign Office (Germany)
- Movement: Allies

Fritz Kolbe (25 September 1900 – 16 February 1971) was a German diplomat who became a spy against the Nazis in World War II.

== Early life ==
Kolbe was born on 25 September 1900 in Berlin to middle-class parents. His father was a saddle maker. Throughout his childhood he was influenced by his father's guidance to be courageous and "always do what he thought right" and the Wandervogel movement, which beginning in 1914 also helped to develop his principled conduct and integrity. Activities with the group of fellow middle-class people allowed him to get away from his family, enjoy nature, and engage in sports.

Kolbe was conscripted into the German army as a civilian worker in October 1917. He was assigned to a telegraph unit and then an engineer battalion between August 1918 and the end of the year. After the war he rejoined the Wandervogel movement. The post-World War I period saw the formation of up to 2,000 youth groups and organizations. These were generally opposed to the government and society of the Weimar Republic; many were subsequently absorbed into the Hitler Youth, but the Wandervogel remained anti-Nazi.

== Education and early career ==
Beginning in 1919, while working at the German State Railways as an apprentice, Kolbe finished school and began studying economics at the University of Berlin. He became the youngest stationmaster for the railway after he passed a civil service exam in 1922. Interested in traveling outside of Germany, Kolbe passed the foreign service examinations in 1925.

== Career ==
He was employed by the German foreign ministry in March 1925 as a clerk. In October of that year he was posted as a mid-level diplomat in Madrid until January 1936. When interviewed by local Nazi party chiefs who asked why he did not join the party, Kolbe's deliberately rambling answers caused him, as he recalled, to be "dismissed as a hopeless case." After Madrid, Kolbe was briefly stationed in Warsaw before returning in mid-1936 to Berlin to take care of his dying wife. He then worked for Rudolph Leitner and, with him, was posted in the Cape Town German consulate in 1937. While in South Africa he socialized with people who, like him, were anti-Nazi.

Kolbe's refusal to join the Nazi Party led him to be assigned lowly clerical work in Berlin after the start of World War II in 1939. By 1941, Joachim von Ribbentrop was the Foreign Minister. He nearly quadrupled the size of the foreign ministry to over 10,000 workers. Many were Nazi party members brought in by Ribbentrop to increase motivation to execute Hitler's endeavors.

Meanwhile, by diligence and skill, Kolbe had earned the trust of the people to whom he reported. He was given positions of increasing responsibility in the Foreign Office. In 1941, Kolbe was assigned, partly due to his brusque manner and intellect, to Karl Ritter who served in the Foreign Office as a liaison with the military. Ritter himself was normally physically located near Hitler's headquarters, the Wolf's Lair. Reports from foreign diplomats and up to 120 cables daily from German consulates and embassies were directed to Berlin for Ritter; Kolbe's duty was to read them all and relay important ones on to Ritter. He also reviewed and summarized news articles from the foreign press. Kolbe realized that his activities were likely under surveillance, given the importance of the work and the fact that Kolbe still would not join the Nazi party. Even so, he was one of the "best-informed civil servants in the Foreign Office".

Kolbe was influenced by surgeon Ferdinand Sauerbruch and around November 1941, becoming determined to actively help defeat the Nazis. Realizing the importance of the information to which he had access, Kolbe tried to make contact with the United States Embassy in Berlin in late 1941, prior to their declaration of war following the Pearl Harbor attack and the closing of the embassy. The longer he was in Berlin, the more Kolbe disliked the Hitler regime and their actions. He sought diplomatic assignments outside of Germany, one of which was consul general at Stavanger, Norway, but was unsuccessful because he would not join the Nazi party. With blank passports that he had brought with him from Cape Town, he was able to help some Jewish people escape Nazi Germany. Kolbe passed information gleaned from cables to the French Resistance, particularly when it could save someone's life or prevent an arrest, as in the case of Cardinal Gerlier. He collaborated with Dr. Adolphe Jung for Free France, using Jung's office to process Foreign Office documents and providing information to Jung who relayed it to the French Resistance. In some cases, the information was then sent to London.

My aim was to help shorten the war for my unfortunate countrymen and to help concentration camp inmates avoid further suffering. — Fritz Kolbe

Life in Nazi Germany worsened in 1942; there were now 56 offenses that could be punished by death, compared to only 3 capital offenses prior to the war. Millions of people had been killed by the regime. The bombardment of German cities began in March of that year. Sentiment within Germany became more critical of Hitler and the Nazi regime and some individuals within the Nazi party, including Ritter (Kolbe's boss), shared this attitude. To maintain control through fear, the Gestapo increasingly arrested and executed suspected wrongdoers. Still, opposition against the regime grew over the course of the year. Kolbe informed the British about a spy who was providing intelligence via the German embassy in Stockholm, Sweden. This led to the spy's arrest.

In 1943, an opportunity for espionage arose when a fellow anti-Nazi in the ministry reassigned Kolbe to higher-grade work as a diplomatic courier. On 19 August 1943, he was entrusted to travel to Bern in Switzerland with the diplomatic bag. While there, he tried to offer mimeographed secret documents to the British embassy. They rebuffed his approach, so he went to the Americans, who decided to take a chance on him. By 1944, they realised they had an agent of the highest quality, though he never received payment for his secret work. He was given the code name "George Wood". His US intelligence handler was Office of Strategic Services agent Allen Welsh Dulles. By the end of the war, he had passed 1,600 documents to his handler in Switzerland. (Note: It was reported in the Independent that Kolbe conveyed 2,600 documents.)

He provided details of:

- German expectations of the site of the D-Day landings,
- V-1 and V-2 programs,
- the Messerschmitt Me 262 jet fighter,
- Japanese plans in Southeast Asia,
- exposure of a spy working in the British embassy in Ankara which was later determined to be German agent "Cicero", Elyesa Bazna

Kolbe's reporting on the mood in Berlin and character analysis was particularly prized by the Americans, according to James Srodes, author of Allen Dulles: Master of Spies. "The information he brought, plus his personal insights were unique and powerful and intensely valuable."

He was described by the Central Intelligence Agency as the most important spy of the war. Allen Dulles wrote: "George Wood (our code name for him) was not only our best source on Germany but undoubtedly one of the best secret agents any intelligence service has ever had."

== Family ==
Kolbe married a woman named Anita in 1925 and in March 1932 the couple had a son. His wife died in Berlin in late 1936 or June 1937. Kolbe married Lita Schoop from Zurich in her homeland in late 1937. They returned to Cape Town in early 1938, during the period in which he was stationed there, but the marriage soon began to fall apart. When the war began in 1939, Kolbe's wife, son and housekeeper remained in South Africa, where he believed they would be safer and free from Nazi ideology. He also sought to divorce his wife at that time.

== Post-war years ==
In 1949, Kolbe tried to settle in the U.S., but could not find suitable work. In 1951, he unsuccessfully applied to return to work for the German Foreign Office. Kolbe finally found a living as a representative of an American power-saw manufacturer. After the war, Kolbe was a despised and much hated figure in Germany, where he was widely viewed as a traitor. Der Stern magazine commented that: "Kolbe's story demonstrates that ordinary Germans could do something to fight Hitler's madness - and post-war Germany treated him like a leper because of his actions."

Kolbe died in Bern due to gallbladder cancer. He is buried in Berlin at the Luisenkirchhof III cemetery. His third wife, Maria Fritsch (1901-2000) is buried with him.

== Assessment ==
In 2003 a biography, Fritz Kolbe: un espion au coeur du IIIe Reich, written by journalist Lucas Delattre was published in France. A year later, a German translation was published, and in 2005 an English translation entitled A spy at the heart of the Third Reich: the extraordinary story of Fritz Kolbe, America's most important spy in World War II was released.

In 2006 British author Nigel West reviewed the biography in the International Journal of Intelligence and CounterIntelligence. West states that the value of Kolbe's information had been exaggerated, as it merely confirmed intelligence already gathered by MI5, or even unwittingly jeopardized operations such as ULTRA and TRIPLEX, of which Dulles would have been largely ignorant. West concludes that Kolbe was "an exceptional character in every way, but also a menace bearing unwanted gifts to an eager suitor", adding that "it is doubtful that Kolbe could ever be considered 'the most important spy of the Second World War'."

Kolbe's work was officially recognized by the Foreign Office of the German Federal Republic when a hall bearing his name was inaugurated in the ministry in 2004. He was listed at the Memorial to the German Resistance in 2005/2006.
