= King's Messenger =

UK government courier

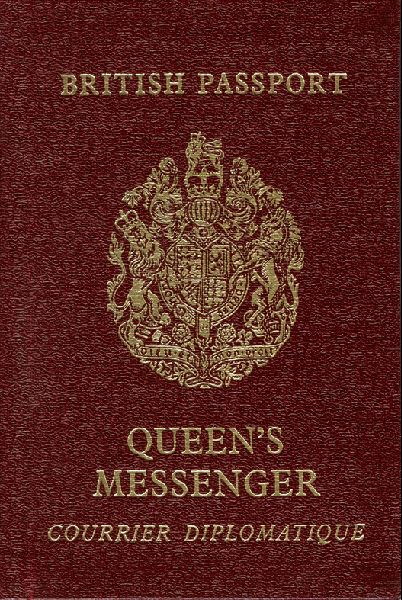
British passport of the Queen’s Messenger travelling on official business (not issued after 2014).

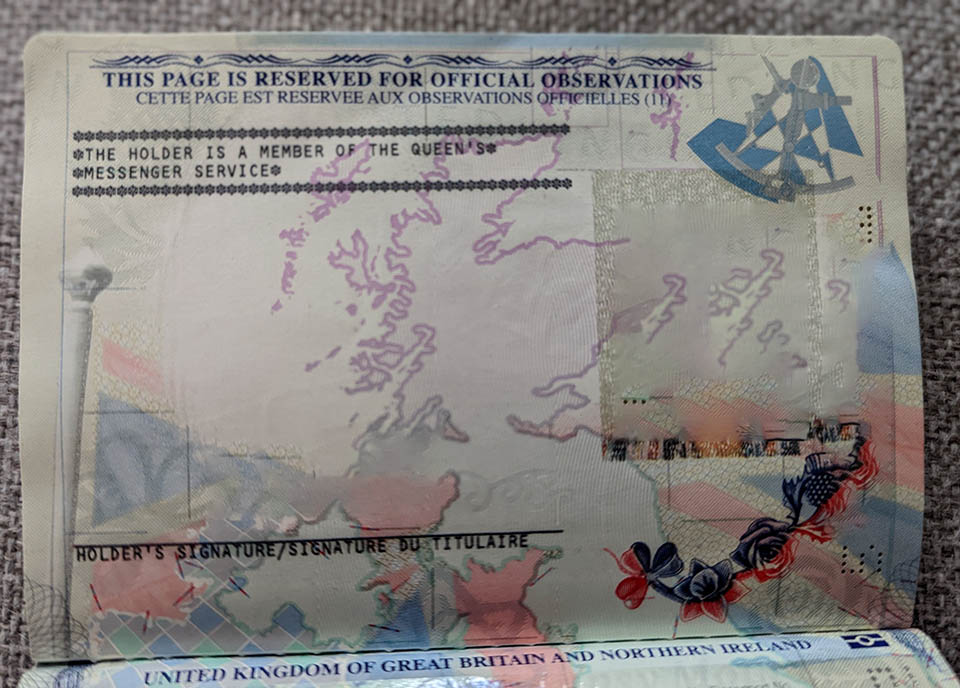

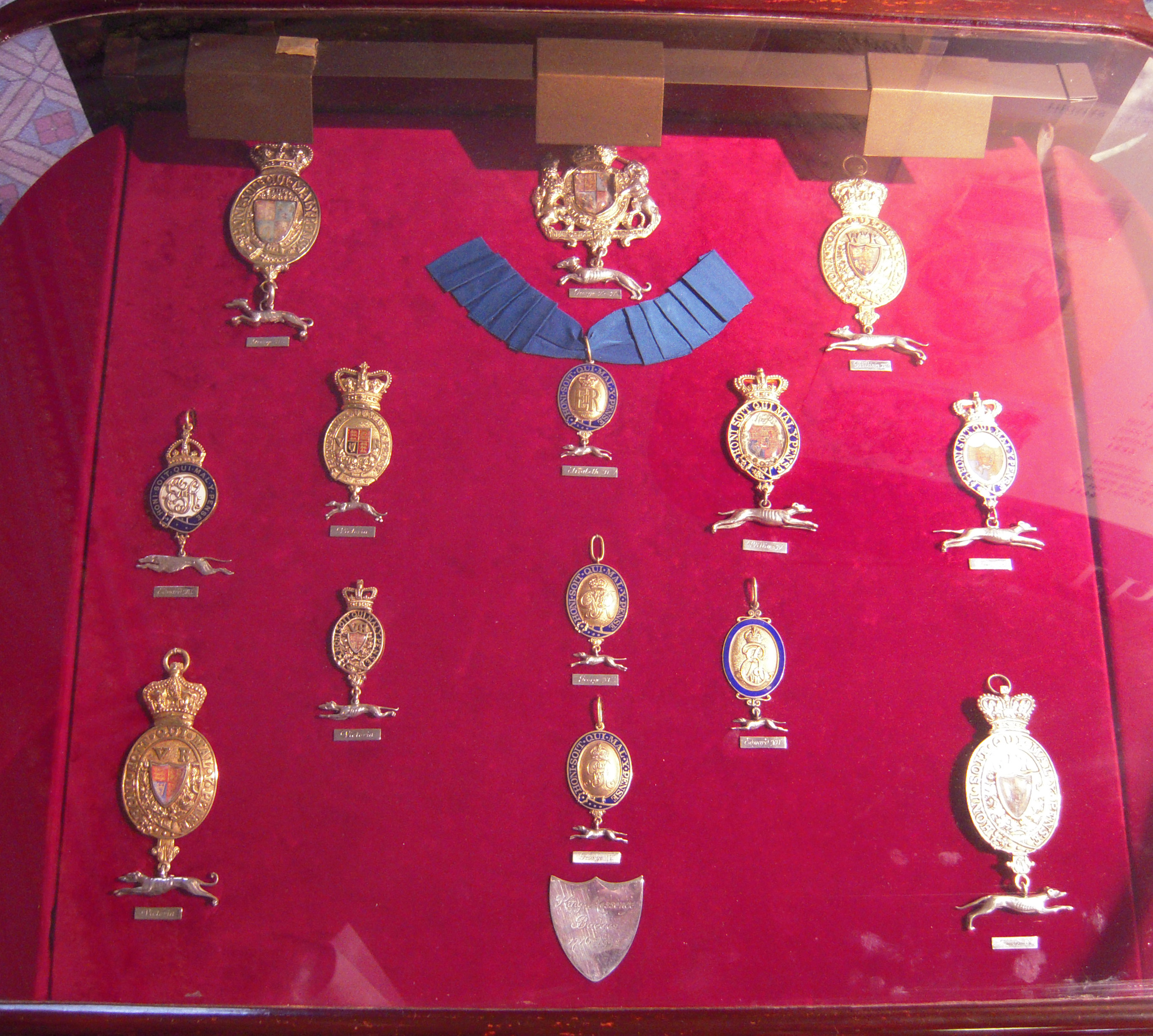
Badges of King's or Queen’s Messengers from 18th to 20th centuries, seen in an exhibition at the Foreign & Commonwealth Office

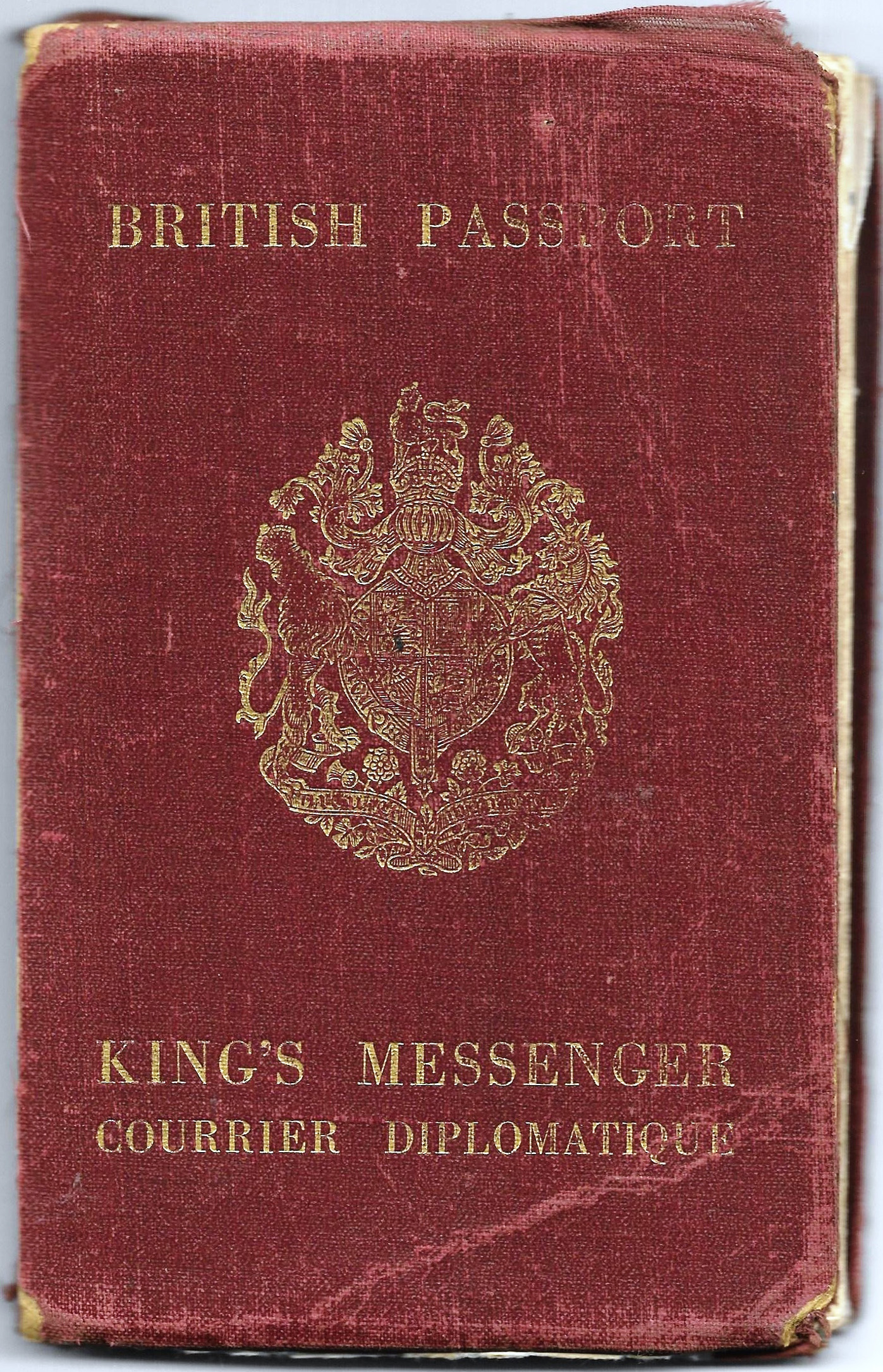
1942 King's Messenger Diplomatic Courier passport.

The Corps of King's Messengers (or Corps of Queen's Messengers during the reign of a female monarch) are couriers employed by the British Foreign, Commonwealth and Development Office (FCDO). They hand-carry secret and important documents to British embassies, high commissions, and consulates around the world. Many King’s Messengers were retired Army personnel. Messengers generally travel in plain clothes in business class on scheduled airlines with their consignment.

The safe passage of diplomatic baggage is guaranteed by Articles 27 and 36 of the Vienna Convention on Diplomatic Relations, and for reasons of state secrecy, the diplomatic bag does not go through normal airport baggage checks and must not be opened, X-rayed, weighed, or otherwise investigated by customs of a foreign state, airline security staff or anyone else. The only exception is if there is serious evidence that it might contain materials prohibited or controlled by quarantine in the destination state. The King’s Messenger has the status of a diplomatic courier and cannot be detained by foreign governments. British diplomatic bags and King’s Messengers do not benefit from these immunities in the UK, and HMRC has the right to examine UK diplomatic bags. The messenger and the messenger's personal luggage can be required to go through normal security screening.

== History ==
The formal role and title ‘Royal Messenger’, whether to King or Queen, is most certainly evident within the retinues of the English monarchy, certainly extending back to the early 12th century. They were termed 'Nuncii' or 'Cursores', depending on whether they travelled by horse or foot, and were well paid. Their role was sufficiently important that individuals with this role can be identified in records from the reigns of kings John, Henry III, and the first three Edwards. They carried messages around England and to other countries on behalf of the government. They were the primary means for communication with local officials such as sheriffs and mayors and travelled in circuits so that the King and his staff had regular updates on the actions that had been commanded. They also sometimes transported money or valuables around the country. The number employed was between 30 and 60.

A noted 15th-century King's Messenger was John Norman, who was appointed in 1485 by King Richard III to hand-deliver secret documents. During his exile, Charles II appointed four trusted men to convey messages to Royalist forces in England. As a sign of their authority, the King broke four silver greyhounds from a bowl familiar to royal courtiers, and gave one to each man. A silver greyhound thus became the symbol of the Service. On formal occasions, the King's Messengers wear this badge from a ribbon, and on less formal occasions male messengers wear ties with a discreet greyhound pattern while working.

In 1824 the messengers became a formal part of the UK Foreign Office.

The Queen's Messengers have a badge of office with the Sovereign's Royal Cypher with a silver greyhound below. Their badge has the motto Honi soit qui mal y pense meaning "shame on anyone who thinks evil of it". Their uniform was a dark blue jacket and waistcoat, grey trousers with scarlet outer seams, gilt buttons embossed with the Royal cypher encircled by the Crown and Garter, and a blue cloth cap. The badge would be suspended from the neck by a Garter blue riband. In practice they avoided wearing the uniform when travelling.

The Queen's Messengers originally had a small salary of £60 and board wages of 7s 6d a day; when abroad they received an extra 5s 10d a day. The mileage allowance depended on the mode of transport: 6d a mile posting, 4d a mile by public conveyance and 2d a mile by sea. For computing their tax and superannuation pension their income was assessed at £400. They made this up by profits from mileage and other allowances, which gave them an income of about £800 a year.

Lord Malmesbury, who was Foreign Secretary 1858-1859, attempted to revise their salary to £525 plus travel expenses without any other emoluments and reduced their number to 15. In 1859 Lord John Russell became Foreign Secretary and their salary was eventually settled at £400 a year with a £1 daily allowance when abroad (excluding departures) plus travel expenses, which came into force in 1861.

By 1892 they had been reduced to 10 Messengers and their annual income was estimated £550. Fewer Messengers were needed because of the greater use of rail travel in Europe with journeys "recurring on stated days of the month - and to certain capitals only - principally Paris, Berlin, Vienna, St. Petersburg, and Constantinople. These fixed journeys take from a fortnight to one month out and home, and are now performed entirely by railway."

== Modern day ==
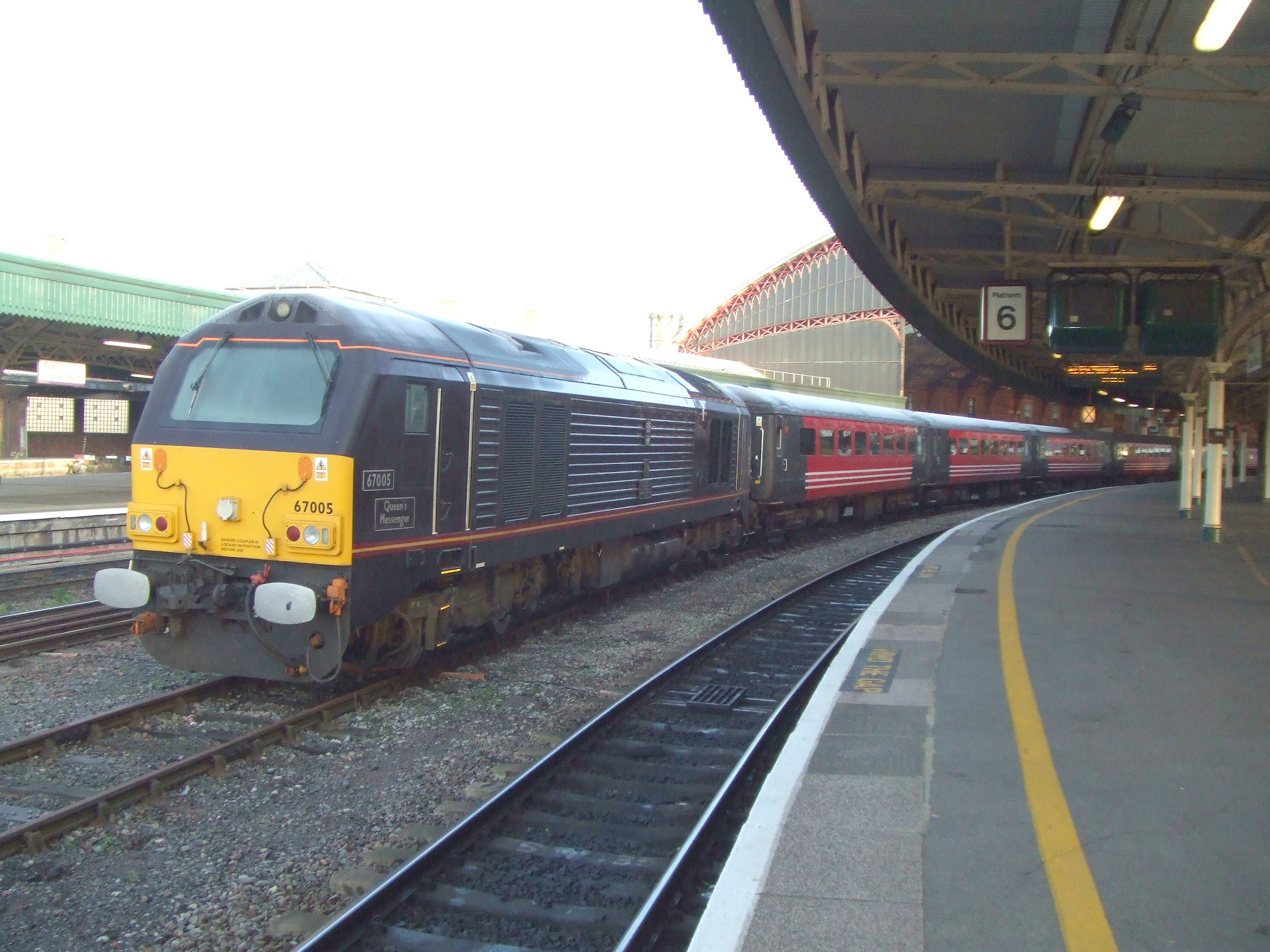
Queen's Messenger diesel locomotive seen at Bristol Temple Meads station in 2008.

Modern communications have diminished the role of the King's Messengers, but as original confidential documents still need to be conveyed securely between countries, their function remains valuable, but declining.

In 1995 a parliamentary question put the number of Messengers then at 27. The number in March 2015 was sixteen full-time and two part-time, and the departmental headcount was nineteen. In December 2015 an article in the Daily Express suggested that the Queen's Messenger service was "facing the chop by cost-cutting Foreign Office mandarins who see them as a legacy of a by-gone age". However the service continues, as part of the secure logistics operation of FCDO Services, part of the Foreign Office. As of 2026, there are 16 full-time King’s Messengers.

The British Rail Class 67 diesel locomotive 67005 bears the name Queen's Messenger.

Following the accession of King Charles III, the Queen’s Messenger Service was officially renamed the King’s Messenger Service with approval from the Royal Household and the Cabinet Office in November 2022.

== See also ==
- Diplomatic courier
- BSAA Star Dust was carrying a King's Messenger at the time of its disappearance.
- SS Berlin was carrying Mr Herbert, a King's Messenger, at the time of its sinking.
- The Queen's Messenger (TV drama)
