= 1947 BSAA Avro Lancastrian Star Dust accident =

Fatal aviation accident

BSAA Star Dust accident
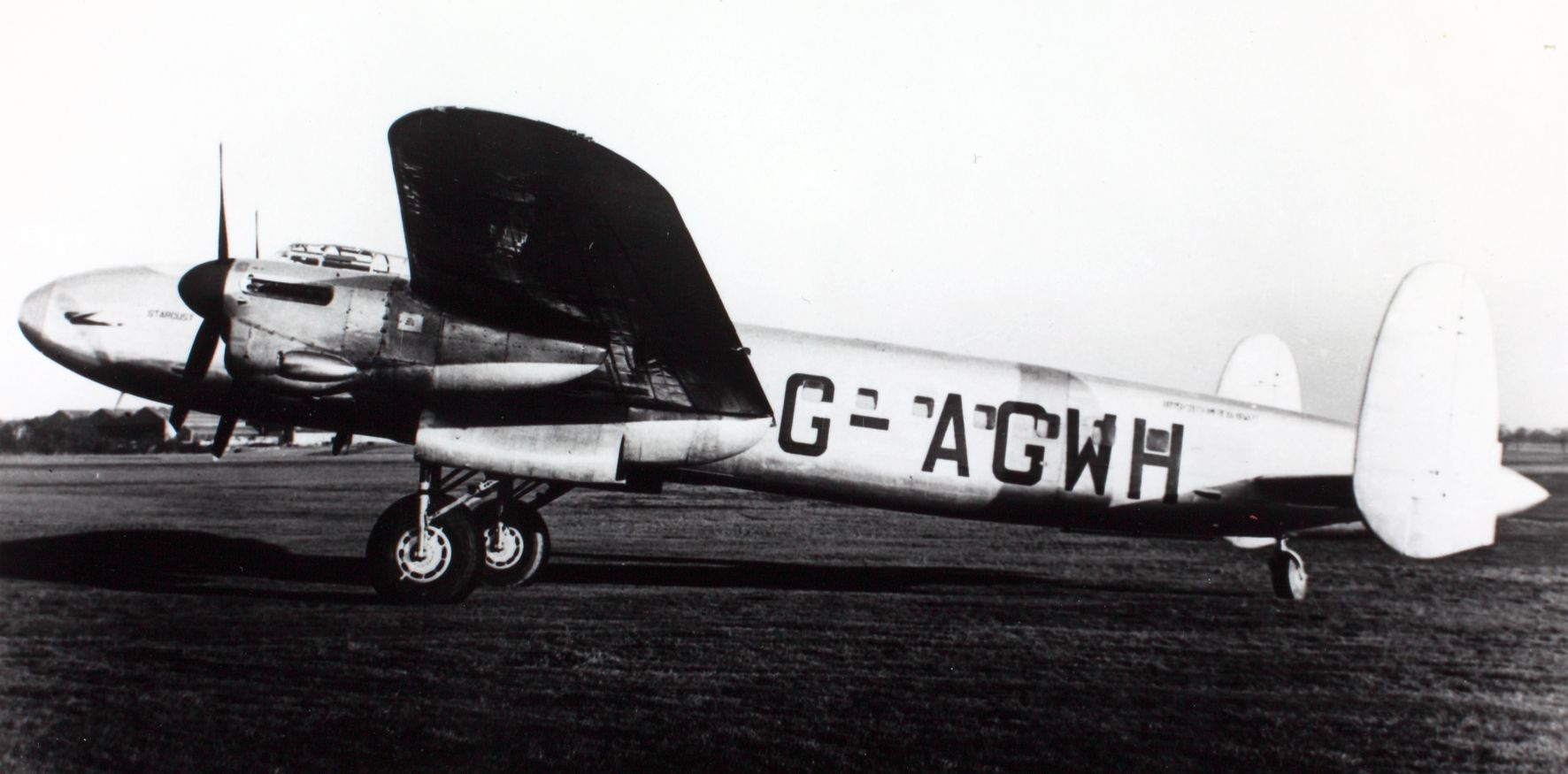
- BSAA Lancastrian 3 G-AGWH painted as Star Dust

Accident
- Date: 2 August 1947
- Summary: Controlled flight into terrain
- Site: Mount Tupungato, Argentina; 33°22′15″S 69°45′40″W

Aircraft
- Aircraft type: Avro Lancastrian
- Operator: British South American Airways
- Registration: G-AGWH
- Flight origin: Morón Airport, Buenos Aires, Argentina
- Destination: Los Cerrillos Airport, Santiago, Chile
- Occupants: 11
- Passengers: 6
- Crew: 5
- Fatalities: 11
- Survivors: 0

On 2 August 1947, Star Dust, a British South American Airways (BSAA) Avro Lancastrian airliner on a flight from Buenos Aires, Argentina, to Santiago, Chile, crashed into Mount Tupungato in the Argentine Andes. An extensive search operation failed to locate the wreckage, despite covering the area of the crash site. The fate of the aircraft and its occupants remained unknown for over fifty years, giving rise to various conspiracy theories about its disappearance.

In the late 1990s, pieces of wreckage from the missing aircraft began to emerge from the glacial ice. It is now believed that the crew became confused as to their exact location while flying at high altitudes through the (then poorly understood) jet stream. Mistakenly believing they had already cleared the mountain tops, they started their descent when they were in fact still behind cloud-covered peaks. Star Dust crashed into Mount Tupungato, killing all aboard and burying itself in snow and ice.

The last word in Star Dust's final Morse code transmission to Santiago airport, "STENDEC", was received by the airport control tower four minutes before its planned landing and repeated twice; it has never been satisfactorily explained.

== Background ==
The accident aircraft, an Avro 691 Lancastrian 3, was built as constructor's number 1280 for the Argentine Ministry of Supply to carry thirteen passengers, and first flew on 27 November 1945. Its civil certificate of airworthiness (CofA) number 7282 was issued on 1 January 1946. It was delivered to BSAA on 12 January 1946, was registered on 16 January as G-AGWH and given the individual aircraft name "Star Dust".

Star Dust carried six passengers and a crew of five on its final flight. The captain, Reginald Cook, was an experienced former Royal Air Force pilot with combat experience during the Second World War, as were his first officer, Norman Hilton Cook, and second officer, Donald Checklin DFC. Cook had been awarded the Distinguished Service Order (DSO) and the Distinguished Flying Cross (DFC). The radio operator, Dennis Harmer, also had a record of wartime as well as civilian service. Iris Evans, who had previously served in the Women's Royal Naval Service ("Wrens") as a chief petty officer, was the flight attendant.

Star Dust's last flight was the final leg of BSAA Flight CS59, which had started in London on an Avro York named Star Mist on 29 July 1947, landing in Buenos Aires on 1 August. The passengers were one woman and five men of Palestinian, Swiss, German and British nationality. One was a British diplomatic courier, a King's Messenger. Marta Limpert, a German émigré, was the only passenger known for certain to have initially boarded Star Dust in London before changing aircraft in Buenos Aires to continue on to Santiago with the other passengers.

== Disappearance ==
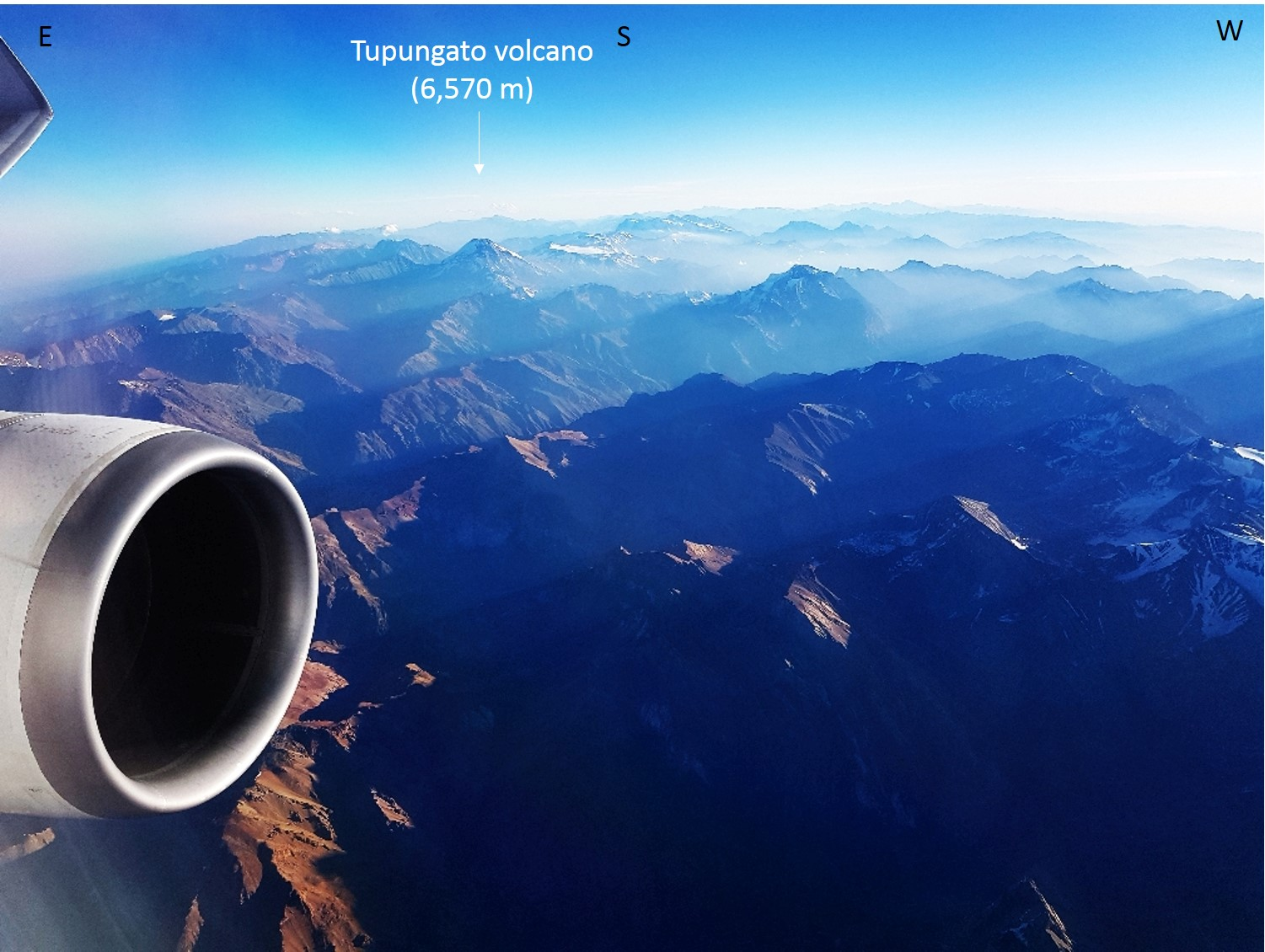
Mount Tupungato seen from the air

Star Dust left Buenos Aires at 1:46 pm on 2 August. This leg of the flight was apparently uneventful until the radio operator (Harmer) sent a routine message in Morse code to the airport in Santiago at 5:41 pm, announcing an expected arrival of 5:45 pm. However, Star Dust never arrived, no more radio transmissions were received by the airport, and intensive efforts by both Chilean and Argentine search teams, as well as by other BSAA pilots, failed to uncover any trace of the aircraft or of the people on board. The head of BSAA, Air Vice Marshal Don Bennett, personally directed an unsuccessful five-day search.

A report by an amateur radio operator who claimed to have received a faint SOS signal from Star Dust initially raised hopes that there might have been survivors, but all subsequent attempts over the years to find the vanished aircraft failed. In the absence of any hard evidence, numerous theories arose—including rumours of sabotage (compounded by the later disappearance of two other aircraft also belonging to BSAA); speculation that Star Dust might have been blown up to destroy diplomatic documents being carried by the King's Messenger; or even the suggestion that Star Dust had been taken or destroyed by a UFO (an idea fuelled by unresolved questions about the flight's final Morse code message).

== Discovery of wreckage and reconstruction of the crash ==
A main wheel from Star Dust, found amidst the wreckage in 2000

In 1998, two Argentine mountaineers climbing Mount Tupungato—about 60 miles (100 km) west-southwest of Mendoza, and about 50 mi (80 km) east of Santiago—found the wreckage of a Rolls-Royce Merlin aircraft engine, along with twisted pieces of metal and shreds of clothing, in the Tupungato Glacier at an elevation of 15,000 ft (4,600 m).

In 2000, an Argentine Army expedition found additional wreckage—including a propeller and wheels (one of which had an intact and inflated tyre)—and noted that the wreckage was well localised, a fact which pointed to a head-on impact with the ground, and which also ruled out a mid-air explosion. Human remains were also recovered, including three torsos, a foot in an ankle boot and a manicured hand. By 2002, the bodies of five of the eight British victims had been identified through DNA testing.

A recovered propeller showed that the engine had been running at near-cruising speed at the time of the impact. Additionally, the condition of the wheels proved that the undercarriage was still retracted, suggesting controlled flight into terrain rather than an attempted emergency landing. During the final portion of Star Dust's flight, heavy clouds would have blocked visibility of the ground. It has therefore been suggested that, in the absence of visual sightings of the ground due to the clouds, a navigational error could have been made as the aircraft flew through the jet stream—a phenomenon not well understood in 1947, in which high-altitude winds can blow at high speed in directions different from those of winds observed at ground level. If the airliner, which had to cross the Andes mountain range at 24,000 feet (7,300 m), had entered the jet-stream zone—which in this area normally blows from the west and south-west, resulting in the aircraft encountering a headwind—this would have significantly decreased the aircraft's ground speed.

Mistakenly assuming their ground speed to be faster than it really was, the crew might have deduced that they had already safely crossed the Andes, and so commenced their descent to Santiago, whereas in fact they were still a considerable distance to the east-north-east and were approaching the cloud-enshrouded Tupungato Glacier at high speed. Some BSAA pilots, however, expressed scepticism at this theory; convinced that Cook would not have started his descent without a positive indication that he had crossed the mountains; they have suggested that strong winds may have brought down the craft in some other way. One of the pilots recalled that "we had all been warned not to enter cloud over the mountains as the turbulence and icing posed too great a threat."

A set of events similar to those that doomed Star Dust also caused the crash of Uruguayan Air Force Flight 571 in 1972 (depicted in the film Alive), although there were survivors from that crash because it involved a glancing blow to a mountainside rather than a head-on collision.

Star Dust is likely to have flown into a nearly vertical snowfield near the top of the glacier, causing an avalanche that buried the wreckage within seconds and concealed it from searchers. As the compressed snow turned to ice, the wreckage would have been incorporated into the body of the glacier, with fragments emerging many years later and much further down the mountain. Between 1998 and 2000, about ten per cent of the total expected wreckage emerged from the glacier, prompting several re-examinations of the accident. More debris is expected to emerge in future, not only as a result of normal glacial motion, but also as the glacier melts.

A 2000 Argentine Air Force investigation cleared Cook of any blame, concluding that the crash had resulted from "a heavy snowstorm" and "very cloudy weather", as a result of which the crew "were unable to correct their positioning".

== STENDEC ==
The last Morse code message sent by Star Dust was "ETA SANTIAGO 17.45 HRS STENDEC". The Chilean Air Force radio operator at Santiago airport described this transmission as coming in "loud and clear" but very fast; as he did not recognise the last word, he requested clarification and heard "STENDEC" repeated twice in succession before contact with the aircraft was lost. This word has not been definitively explained and has given rise to much speculation.

The staff of the BBC television series Horizon—which presented an episode in 2000 on the Star Dust disappearance—received hundreds of messages from viewers proposing explanations of "STENDEC". These included suggestions that the radio operator, possibly suffering from hypoxia, had scrambled the word "DESCENT" (of which "STENDEC" is an anagram); that "STENDEC" may have been the initials of some obscure phrase or that the airport radio operator had misheard the Morse code transmission despite it reportedly having been repeated multiple times. The Horizon staff concluded that, with the possible exception of some misunderstanding based on Morse code, none of these proposed solutions was plausible.

The simplest explanation put forward to date is that the spacing of the rapidly sent message was misheard or sloppily sent. In Morse code, determining accurate spacing between characters is vital to properly interpret the message; "STENDEC" uses exactly the same dot/dash sequence as "SCTI AR" (SCTI being the ICAO four-letter code for Los Cerrillos Airport in Santiago, AR being the Morse abbreviation for "over"). Alternatively, the Morse spelling for "STENDEC" is one character off from instead spelling "VALP", the call sign for the airport at Valparaiso, 110 kilometers north of Santiago.

== See also ==
- BSAA Star Tiger disappearance
- BSAA Star Ariel disappearance
- LAN Chile Flight 621
- Uruguayan Air Force Flight 571
