= Museo Nacional Aeronáutico y del Espacio =

Coordinates: 33.48719°S 70.69709°W

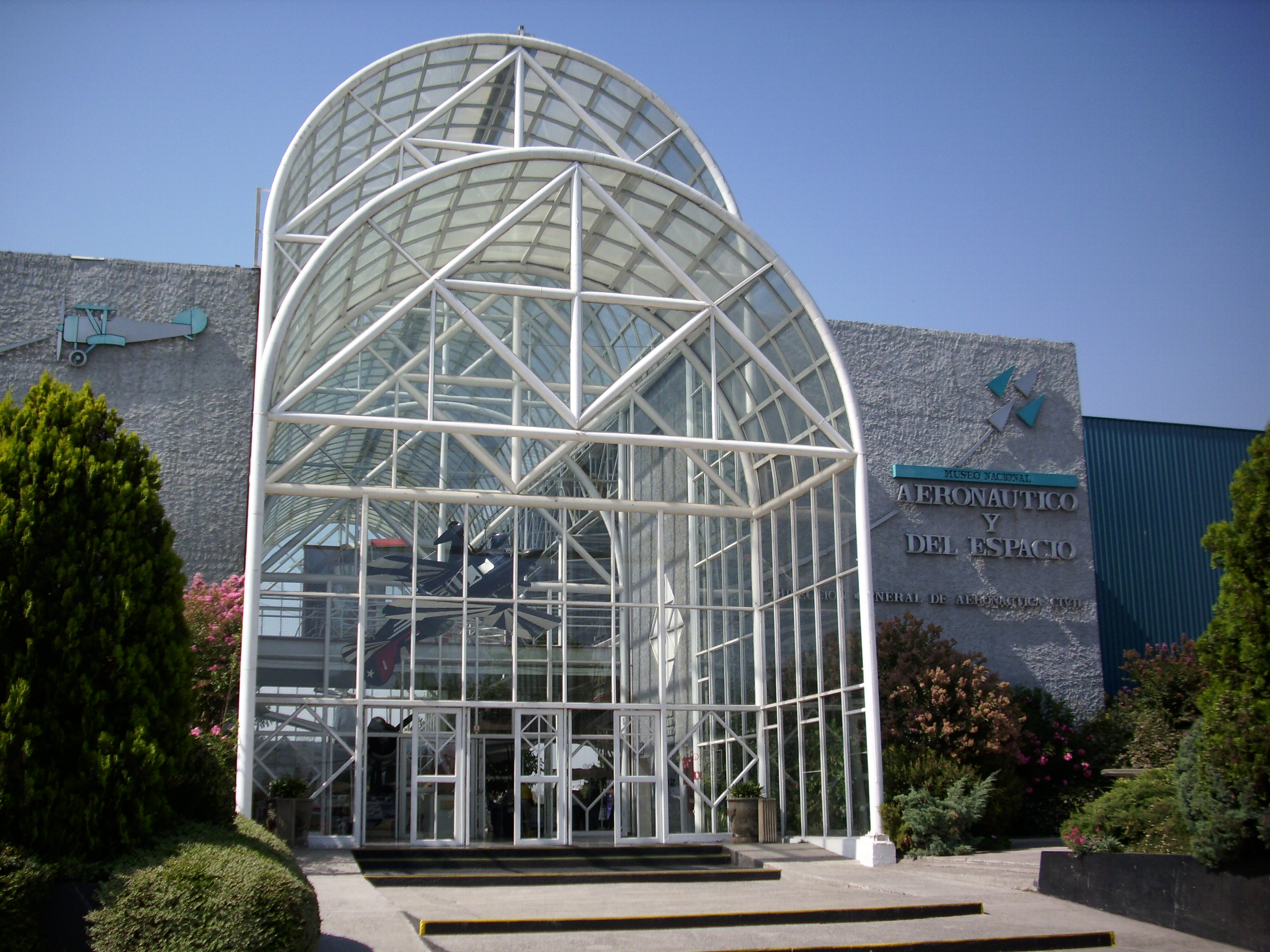
- Established: 9 March 1992 (new building)
- Location: Santiago
- Type: Aerospace museum
- Website: museoaeronautico.dgac.gob.cl

The Museo Nacional Aeronáutica y del Espacio, MNAE (English: National Aeronautical and Space Museum) is an institution responsible for disseminating the aeronautical heritage in Chile.

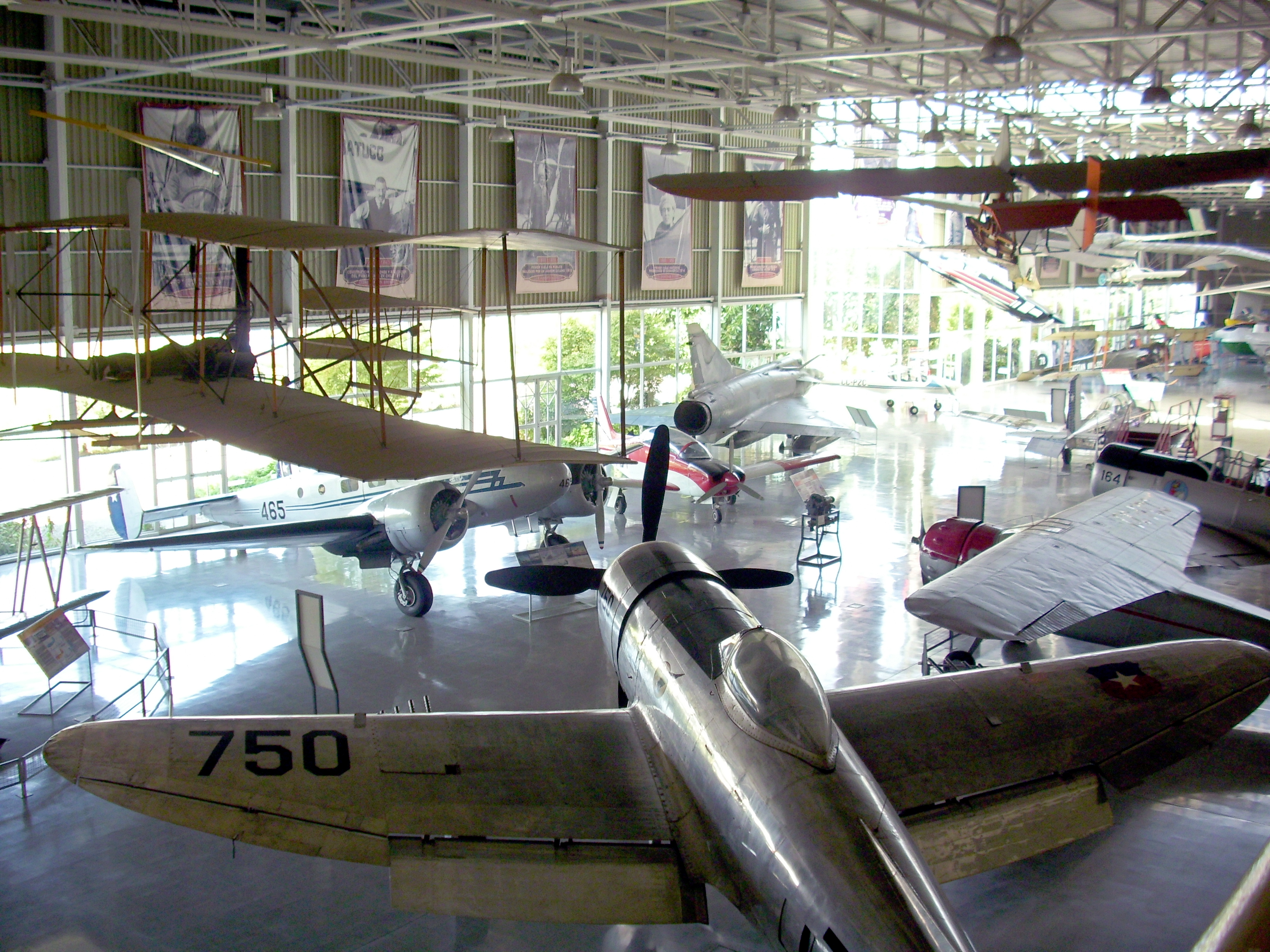
The main hall of the museum, similar to a hangar, where aircraft from all eras are exhibited.

== History ==
It was created on July 13, 1944, as Museo de Aviación, during the government of Juan Antonio Ríos, by Supreme Decree No. 486, which stipulated, among other things, that it would be located in Santiago, that it would depend on the General Directorate of Civil Aeronautics and that it would be developed thanks to donations and expenditures.

Originally located at Cathedral Street in Central Santiago, it later moved to other facilities belonging to the Directorate of Aeronautics and the Museo Histórico Nacional. In 1968, it was transferred to the Paris Pavilion of the Quinta Normal, which is now occupied by the Museo Artequin; Finally, on September 20, 1988, construction began on the modern museum building, located in Cerrillos commune on land that previously belonged to Los Cerrillos Airport (Avenida Pedro Aguirre Cerda No. 5000). The architect in charge of its design was Fernando Torres Arancibia.

On March 9, 1992, the museum was inaugurated by the then president of Chile, Patricio Aylwin, the minister of defense, Patricio Rojas, the commander in chief of the Fuerza Aérea de Chile, Ramón Vega, the general director of civil aeronautics, José de la Fuente, and the director of the museum, Mario Jahn. Later, the then president, Eduardo Frei Ruiz-Tagle, signed Supreme Decree No. 800 of October 26, 1995, with which the character of "national" was recognized and it obtained its current name.

Due to the COVID-19 pandemic, the MNAE was closed to the public in April 2020 and reopened in January 2022.

== See also ==
- Los Cerrillos Airport
- List of aviation museums

== Bibliography ==
- Ogden, Bob (2008). Aviation Museums and Collections of the Rest of the World. Tonbridge, Kent: Air-Britain (Historians). ISBN 978-0-851-30-394-9.
