= BSAA Star Ariel disappearance =

1949 disappearance of passenger aircraft

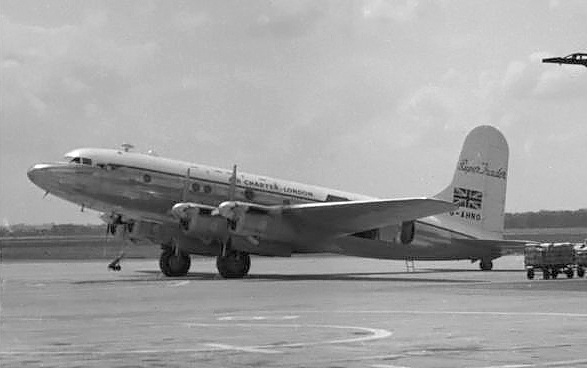
- An Avro Tudor Mk.IVB Super Trader similar to the aircraft that disappeared

Accident
- Date: 17 January 1949
- Summary: Disappearance
- Site: Atlantic Ocean

Aircraft
- Aircraft type: Avro 688 Tudor Mark IV
- Aircraft name: Star Ariel
- Operator: British South American Airways (BSAA)
- Registration: G-AGRE
- Flight origin: Bermuda
- Destination: Kingston, Jamaica
- Passengers: 13
- Crew: 7
- Fatalities: 20
- Survivors: 0

External image
- A picture of Star Ariel

Star Ariel (registration G-AGRE) was an Avro Tudor passenger aircraft owned and operated by British South American Airways (BSAA) which disappeared without a trace over the Atlantic Ocean while on a flight between Bermuda and Kingston, Jamaica, on 17 January 1949. The loss of the aircraft, along with that of BSAA Avro Tudor Star Tiger in January 1948, remains unsolved, with the resulting speculation helping to develop the Bermuda Triangle legend.

== Background ==
British South American Airways (BSAA) was an airline created by former World War II pilots in an effort to provide service on the previously untapped South American trade and passenger routes. Originally named British Latin American Air Lines (BLAIR), it was split off from the British Overseas Airways Corporation (now British Airways) to operate its South Atlantic routes. BSAA commenced transatlantic services in March 1946, making the first operational flight from London's Heathrow Airport. The airline operated mostly Avro aircraft: Yorks, Lancastrians and Tudors. Its destinations included Bermuda, the West Indies and the western coast of South America.

== Flight ==
The Star Ariel was one of three enlarged and improved versions of the Avro Tudor, designated Mark IVs. On 17 January 1949, Star Ariel was awaiting flight instructions at Kindley Field, Bermuda, with no passengers. Meanwhile, BSAA Tudor G-AHNK Star Lion suffered an engine failure on approach to Bermuda, landing without incident. Star Ariel was promptly pressed into service to take G-AHNK's passengers on to their destination of Kingston, Jamaica.

Star Ariel took off at 08:41 with seven crew and thirteen passengers. Weather conditions were excellent, and her pilot in command, Captain John Clutha McPhee (formerly of the Royal New Zealand Air Force), decided on a high-altitude flight to take advantage of it. About an hour into the flight McPhee contacted Kingston by radio:

"I DEPARTED FROM KINDLEY FIELD AT 8:41 A.M. HOURS. MY ETA AT KINGSTON 2:10 P.M. HOURS. I AM FLYING IN GOOD VISIBILITY AT 18,000 FT. I FLEW OVER 150 MILES SOUTH OF KINDLEY FIELD AT 9:32 HRS. MY ETA AT 30° N IS 9:37 HRS. WILL YOU ACCEPT CONTROL?"

And then at 09:42:

"I WAS OVER 30° N AT 9:37 I AM CHANGING FREQUENCY TO MRX."

== Loss ==
No more messages were received from Star Ariel and Kingston finally reported her overdue.

== Search ==
The search for the Star Ariel began with another Tudor IV, G-AHNJ Star Panther. She had earlier landed at Nassau, and now refuelled and took off at 15:25 to fly out to Star Ariel's route, bisect it, and follow it back to Bermuda. Another aircraft took off from Bermuda, flew 500 mi (800 km), then did a 10 mi (16 km) lattice search all the way back. A US Navy task force headed by the battleship USS Missouri and including the aircraft carriers USS Kearsarge and USS Leyte assisted in the search, which expanded to dozens of ships and several planes over the next few days.

By 19 January the search had been broadened to an area of 55,000 sq mi (140,000 km^{2}) southwest of Bermuda. USAF Major Keith Cloe, who had been put in charge, said that the search would be continued until 22 January and extended if any reports of debris were received. The search was finally abandoned on 23 January, with aircraft from Kindley Field having flown over 1,000,000 mi (1,600,000 km). No sign of debris, oil slicks or wreckage had been found.

== Investigation ==
A representative of the Chief Inspector of Accidents left for Bermuda on 18 January 1949.

It was revealed that there had been no bad weather, none of the weather reports indicating any abnormal conditions, and the chance of any marked clear air turbulence was almost nil. There were no clouds above 10,000 ft (3,000 m) over the whole of the aircraft's route.

However, although the weather was good, the day in question had suffered communication problems ranging from static to poor reception to complete blackouts lasting as much as 10 minutes which came and went, selectively affecting certain planes calling certain stations from different angles. The communication problem lasted almost exactly the entire time the Star Ariel would have been in flight, finally lifting around 13:07.

This was investigated, along with McPhee's switch over to Kingston frequency which was considered early, as he was still close to Bermuda at the time. It was considered possible that a distress transmission on that frequency might not have been heard, given the aircraft's distance from Kingston.

However, a BSAA representative in Kingston observed:

"It would appear that the aircraft should have made firm contact with MRX before requesting permission from Bermuda to change frequency. This was obviously not done as MRX never worked G-AGRE on this frequency at all. In addition I am convinced that G-AGRE did not ever transmit on this frequency of 6523 kc/s. even if Bermuda did give authority to change frequency which they could quite readily have done. This latter opinion is based on the fact that not only was MRX in Jamaica listening out on 6523 kc/s. but so also were New York, Miami, Nassau, Havana, and Bilbao and, so far as we are aware and from what definite information we have, none of these stations ever heard from G-AGRE on 6523 kc/s. Whilst it may have been possible for us not to hear G-AGRE owing to the bad reception Palisadoes [Kingston Aerodrome] was experiencing at the time of the requested QSY [change of frequency], it would seem most improbable for similar conditions to obtain with all those other stations listening out on that frequency."

=== Conclusions ===
On 21 December 1949 the report of the inquiry was issued by the Chief Inspector of Accidents, Air Commodore Vernon Brown, CB, OBE, MA, FRAeS. In it he stated that "through lack of evidence due to no wreckage having been found, the cause of the accident is unknown."

Brown said that there was no evidence of defect in, or failure of, any part of the aircraft before its departure from Bermuda. The all-up weight and the centre of gravity were within the prescribed limits; a daily inspection had been carried out; the pilot was experienced on the route; the radio officer was very experienced and also experienced on the route; good radio communications had been maintained with the aircraft up to and including reception of its last message; there were no weather complications, and a study of the weather reports have no reason to believe that the accident was caused by meteorological conditions. There was also no evidence of sabotage, though Brown said that the possibility of such could not be entirely eliminated.

It was accepted that radio communications were poor during the early afternoon and worsened between 16:00 and 17:00, but Brown said it seemed strange that no attempt was made by BSAA staff at Kingston to find out whether anything had been heard of the aircraft until 2 hours 28 minutes after its last radio transmission. Kingston also did not attempt to establish contact with the aircraft until 17:10 or inquire as to whether it had made contact with Nassau or New York or any other radio station.

== Aftermath ==
As a result of the loss, BSAA withdrew all five of its remaining Tudor IVs from service until each had been examined. The company faced problems in maintaining its services, since it was difficult to find aircraft of sufficient range, and considered chartering Avro Lancastrians.

Don Bennett, who had been fired by BSAA in 1948 when he objected to a judicial investigation into the loss of the Star Tiger, later claimed that both the Star Tiger and Star Ariel had been sabotaged and that "a known war-registered saboteur" had been seen near the Star Tiger shortly before its last takeoff. He also claimed that Prime Minister Clement Attlee had ordered all enquiries into the incidents to be abandoned.

The Tudor IV aircraft were converted to freight use, but Bennett had two restored to passenger use, and one of these, G-AKBY Star Girl, crashed near Cardiff in March 1950 with the loss of 80 lives, at that time the worst air accident in Britain. An enquiry found incorrect loading to be the cause.

A 2009 theory is that the poor design of the Tudor IVB's cabin heater could have contributed to the plane's loss. According to Don Mackintosh, a former BSAA Tudor IV pilot, and Captain Peter Duffey, a former BSAA pilot, the cabin heater, located underneath the floor of the cockpit, was also placed close to hydraulic pipes. This meant that hydraulic vapor could have leaked and come into contact with the hot heater, causing either a fire or an explosion. Eric Newton, an air accident investigator who reviewed the case of Star Ariel, concluded such an occurrence could have become quickly catastrophic: "If the heater had caught fire down below the floorboards then it could have developed to a catastrophic state before the crew knew anything about it. There was no automatic fire extinguisher to put it out like there is nowadays. There was no alarm where the heater was stored... so no-one would know, possibly until it was too late."

== See also ==
- BSAA Star Dust accident, crashed on 2 August 1947
