= BSAA Star Tiger disappearance =

1948 disappearance of a passenger aircraft en route from Portugal to Bermuda

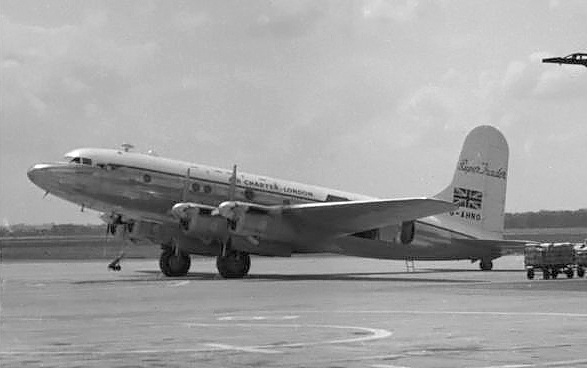
- An Avro Tudor Mk.IVB Super Trader similar to the aircraft that disappeared

Accident
- Date: 30 January 1948
- Summary: Disappearance
- Site: Atlantic Ocean

Aircraft
- Aircraft type: Avro 688 Tudor Mark IV
- Aircraft name: Star Tiger
- Operator: British South American Airways (BSAA)
- Registration: G-AHNP
- Flight origin: Lisbon
- Stopover: Santa Maria
- Destination: Bermuda
- Occupants: 31
- Passengers: 25
- Crew: 6
- Fatalities: 31
- Missing: 31
- Survivors: 0

Star Tiger (registration G-AHNP) was an Avro Tudor passenger aircraft owned and operated by British South American Airways (BSAA) which disappeared without a trace over the Atlantic Ocean while on a flight between Santa Maria in the Azores and Bermuda in the early morning of 30 January 1948. The loss of the aircraft, along with that of BSAA Avro Tudor Star Ariel in 1949, remains unsolved.

== Background ==
British South American Airways (BSAA) was an airline created by former World War II pilots in an effort to provide service on the previously untapped South American trade and passenger routes. Originally named British Latin American Air Lines (BLAIR) it was split off from the British Overseas Airways Corporation to operate its South Atlantic routes. It commenced transatlantic services in March 1946, with a BSAA Avro Lancastrian making the first operational flight from London's Heathrow Airport. The airline operated mostly Avro aircraft: Yorks, Lancastrians and Tudors, and flew to Bermuda, the West Indies and the western coast of South America.

== Flight ==
Star Tiger was one of three enlarged and improved versions of the Avro Tudor, designated Tudor IV; it had made 11 transatlantic flights, a total of 575 hours flying time, since its initial test flight on 4 November 1947.

On the morning of 28 January 1948, the crew and passengers boarded Star Tiger at Lisbon only to be forced to return to the airport waiting room when the pilot, Captain Brian W. McMillan, told them that the port inner engine needed some attention. The aircraft took off 2 1/2 hours later, and made what was intended to be a 75-minute refuelling stop at Santa Maria in the Azores. However, the reported weather was so poor that Captain McMillan decided they should stop over until the next day.

Of the passengers, 15 were British, 1 was Australian (Air Marshal Sir Arthur Coningham), two were Mexican, two were Czech, one was Swiss, and four were stateless. Of the passengers, seven were bound for Bermuda, 12 were bound for Kingston, Jamaica, and six were bound for Havana, Cuba.

The following day, 29 January, Star Tiger took off for the next leg of its flight to Bermuda despite strong winds. McMillan had decided to fly at no more than 2,000 ft (610 m) so as to avoid the worst winds. An Avro Lancastrian belonging to BSAA piloted by Frank Griffin took off an hour ahead of the Star Tiger, and Griffin had agreed to radio weather information back to Star Tiger.

Star Tiger took off at 15:34 and soon after takeoff was lashed by heavy rain and strong winds. At first some 200 miles (320 km) behind the Lancastrian, McMillan slowly closed the distance between them and both aircraft remained in radio contact with each other and Bermuda. Second pilot aboard the Star Tiger was David Colby DFC, like McMillan a highly experienced pilot and ex-RAF Pathfinder Force squadron leader.

By 01:26 on 30 January, after 10 hours in the air, Star Tiger was only 150 mi (240 km) behind the Lancastrian. The navigator of the Lancastrian managed to fix their position using celestial navigation and found that the winds had blown the aircraft 60 mi (100 km) off track in the previous hour. By this time, Star Tiger had passed its Point of No Alternative, at which it could have diverted to Newfoundland, and was committed to remaining on course for Bermuda.

At about 02:00, Cyril Ellison, Star Tiger's navigator, fixed the aircraft's position and learned that they too had been blown off course and were crabbing away from Bermuda. He gave McMillan a new course which turned the aircraft directly into a gale. However, McMillan still expected to reach Bermuda with at least an hour's worth of fuel remaining upon landing.

A merchant ship, SS Troubadour, had reported seeing a low flying aircraft with lights blinking about halfway between Bermuda and the entrance to Delaware Bay, which meant that if the aircraft was Star Tiger, then it had gone well off-course from Bermuda. This alleged sighting occurred about 02:00 [Eastern Standard Time].

At 03:00, Captain Griffin aboard the Lancastrian amended his ETA from 03:56 to 05:00, and called Star Tiger to say that he was switching to voice telephony to contact Bermuda Approach Control. Griffin later testified that he heard nothing from Star Tiger to indicate that it was in trouble and that from then until he touched down at 04:11 his own aircraft encountered no turbulence, icing, fog or electrical storms.

== Loss ==
At 03:04 Radio Officer Robert Tuck aboard Star Tiger requested a radio bearing from Bermuda, but the signal was not strong enough to obtain an accurate reading. Tuck repeated the request 11 minutes later, and this time the Bermuda radio operator was able to obtain a bearing of 72 degrees, accurate to within 2 degrees. The Bermuda operator transmitted this information, and Tuck acknowledged receipt at 03:17. This was the last communication with the aircraft.

The Bermuda operator tried to contact Star Tiger at 03:50 and, receiving no reply, thought that it had gone over to direct radio contact with Bermuda Approach Control. However, Approach Control reported that this was not the case. The Bermuda radio operator tried at 04:05 to contact Star Tiger, again without success, and after trying again at 04:40 he declared a state of emergency.

He had heard no distress message, and neither had anyone else, even though many receiving stations were listening on Star Tiger's frequency.

On 30 January 1948, a press dispatch reported the plane's loss at 440 miles (710 km) northeast of Bermuda.

== Search ==
The U.S. Air Force personnel operating the airfield immediately organised a rescue effort that lasted for five days despite worsening weather. Twenty-six aircraft flew 882 hours in total and surface craft also conducted a search, but no signs of Star Tiger or her 31 passengers and crew were ever found. On 1 February 1948, a B-17 search plane reported sighting several boxes and an oil drum 325 miles (523 km) northwest of Bermuda; it is unknown if this flotsam was connected to the missing plane or not.

== Investigation ==
As soon as it was learned that the Star Tiger had been lost, BSAA's remaining Avro Tudors were grounded by Britain's Minister of Civil Aviation. They were permitted to carry cargo rather than passengers a few weeks later, but had to fly from Santa Maria to Bermuda via Newfoundland, a diversion that reduced the longest overwater leg by 250 mi (400 km).

Although Avro's managing director, Sir Roy Dobson, and Don Bennett of BSAA both publicly rejected any implication that the aircraft had been faulty, the minister decided that a judicial investigation ("Court of Investigation") into the cause of the incident was necessary, the first such since the loss of the airship R101 in 1930. Bennett objected so strongly to this that BSAA fired him.

Lord Macmillan was appointed to head the investigation, assisted by two assessors in the form of a professor of aviation from the University of London and the chief pilot of British European Airways. Professor Arnold Hall of the Royal Aircraft Establishment (RAE) was appointed as an assessor. Other persons at the inquiry included Quentin Hogg QC, John Donaldson QC, and Joseph Orrell.

The investigation, which was held in public at Church House, Westminster, opened on 12 April 1948 and lasted 11 days. On 21 August it presented its report to Lord Pakenham, who had succeeded Lord Nathan of Churt as Minister of Civil Aviation. The report emphasised that the crew of the Star Tiger were highly experienced, and found "want of care and attention to detail" in the flight plan, but nothing serious enough to explain the accident.

The inquiry reported in conclusion:

...In the complete absence of any reliable evidence as to either the nature or the cause of the accident of Star Tiger the Court has not been able to do more than suggest possibilities, none of which reaches the level even of probability.... What happened in this case will never be known and the fate of Star Tiger must remain an unsolved mystery.

Among the passengers was Air Marshal Sir Arthur Coningham, a hero of World War II, formerly Air Officer Commander-in-Chief, 2nd Tactical Air Force during the Battle of Normandy. Coningham's death appeared on the front page of The New York Times on 31 January along with the news of the assassination of Mahatma Gandhi and the death of Orville Wright.

=== Conclusions ===
If the Star Tiger's radio had failed shortly after 03:15, her captain and navigator would have been faced with the task of locating a small group of islands, measuring 22 mi (35 km) from northeast to southwest covering a total area of 20 sq mi (52 km^{2}), and equipped with powerful lights that were visible from about 30 mi (50 km) at the aircraft's assumed altitude. It was at that time about 340 mi (550 km) from the islands with enough fuel for 3 1/2 hours' flying time. However, as they were flying in a gale storm, they could have encountered headwinds that could have caused a faster consumption of fuel than the crew realised. Having received an accurate bearing, McMillan's task of making landfall was not in itself difficult, except that he was acutely aware of the fact that there was no alternative airport: the nearest point on the American mainland was Cape Hatteras, 580 mi (930 km) to the west, and well beyond the Star Tiger's range. However, there was no evidence to suggest that radio failure or navigational error were responsible for the disaster.

As for engine failure, the aircraft could easily have reached Bermuda on two engines. Its lack of altitude, however, would have made any handling problem more dangerous. The altitude chosen by the Star Tiger and the Lancastrian was much lower than usual, and no previous BSAA flight had flown so low for so long. Wind forecasts were unreliable throughout the journey, especially lower; consequently, a sudden strong gust could have abruptly plunged the aircraft into the sea, or inattention on the part of the crew coupled with a faulty altimeter could have allowed it to dive gently into the sea, giving the radio operator no chance to transmit a distress signal. One notable discrepancy was that although the planned cruising altitude was 2,000 feet, every position report transmitted by Star Tiger gave the height as 20,000 feet (6,100 m). Since 20,000 feet was a more typical cruising altitude for this route, it is possible the crew forgot they were flying at only 2,000 feet and simply flew the aircraft into the sea during the descent phase. The crew may have been fatigued after the long flight, and contemporary altimeters were prone to misreading of the thousand-foot level. The aircraft was, however, also fitted with a radio altimeter.

Twice before on similar flights, the Star Tiger had been forced to divert to Gander, Newfoundland, and just two months previously another Tudor IV had found itself landing with less than 100 imp gal (450 L; 120 US gal) of fuel left; less than the amount by which the Star Tiger was overloaded.

== Aftermath ==
During the inquiry, Bennett suggested both the Star Tiger and Star Ariel had been sabotaged. He also claimed that the Prime Minister, Clement Attlee, had ordered all inquiries into the incidents to be abandoned.

A more recent theory (2009) is that the loss of fuel could have contributed to the plane's disappearance. Also, the fuel cocks for the reserve tanks were in the passenger compartment and, if they were not already on, to switch to reserve one of the crew would have to go aft. There might have been insufficient time to do so, given the height at which they were flying.

== See also ==
- BSAA Star Dust accident
- List of people who disappeared mysteriously at sea
