= British South American Airways =

United Kingdom state-run airline (1944–1950)

- Founded: 25 January 1944
- Commenced operations: 1 January 1946
- Ceased operations: 1 January 1950
- Operating bases: Langley Airfield; London Heathrow Airport
- Subsidiaries: British West Indian Airways
- Fleet size: See List of aircraft below
- Parent company: Government owned after 1 August 1946
- Key people: Don Bennett (CEO until February 1948)

British South American Airways (BSAA) was a state-run airline of the United Kingdom in the mid-to-late 1940s responsible for services to the Caribbean and South America. Originally named British Latin American Air Lines, it was renamed before services started in 1946. BSAA operated mostly Avro aircraft: Yorks, Lancastrians and Tudors and flew to Bermuda, the West Indies, Mexico and the western coast of South America. After two high-profile aircraft disappearances it was merged into the British Overseas Airways Corporation at the end of 1949.

Most of BSAA's aircraft were given individual aircraft names beginning with "Star", which have long been used in long-range celestial navigation.

== History ==
British Latin American Air Lines Ltd. (BLAIR) was formed on 25 January 1944 by shipping interests (Royal Mail Lines, Pacific Steam Navigation Company, Lamport & Holt Line, Booth Steamship Company and Blue Star Line) to complement the companies' shipping services to South America; on 26 October 1945 the company was renamed British South American Airways Ltd.. The chairman of the new company was J. W. Booth. The initial aircraft – until the Avro Tudor II was available – would be Avro Lancasters converted by Avro into the same configuration as Avro Lancastrians and the crews were being sought from former Pathfinder Force members: the general manager Don Bennett had been the force commander during the war. The single route to be flown was Hurn-Lisbon-Bathurst-Natal-Rio de Janeiro-Montevideo-Buenos Aires.

On 1 January 1946, the airline's first Avro Lancastrian, Star Light, flown by Don Bennett and R. Clifford Alabaster, undertook the first flight from the newly opened Heathrow Airport; it was on a proving flight to South America. The first commercial flight followed ten weeks later. With the approaching nationalisation of British airlines, the airline came under the control of the British Overseas Airways Corporation and with the passing of the Civil Aviation Act 1946 – which set up three nationally owned corporations – BSAA became a government-owned corporation on 1 August 1946 charged with developing services from the UK to South America. This responsibility was then expanded later in 1946 to routes to the West Indies, Central America and the west coast of South America.

In January 1947 the airline reached an agreement with British West Indian Airways which would become an associate. BSAA would buy the majority of shares in BWIA and provide technical advice and general supervision. In May 1947 the airline started a series of test flights to Bermuda using a converted Avro Lancaster which was refuelled in mid-air over the Azores to complete the flight in 20 hours. On 2 August 1947, Avro Lancastrian Star Dust crashed in Argentina with the loss of all on board. In the first financial year under government control (August 1946 – March 1947) the airline made a surplus of £20,507. The two other airline corporations BOAC and BEA made a combined loss of £10,234,781. On 31 March 1947 the corporation had a staff of 1,031 and had carried 5,397 passengers since August 1946. For navigation purposes, the Lancastrians and Yorks were using military Gee radar over Europe, and Rebecca on the other side of the Atlantic.

On 30 January 1948, Avro Tudor Star Tiger, with a crew of six and 25 passengers bound for Bermuda, disappeared over the Atlantic Ocean. The remaining Tudors were grounded while an investigation was undertaken. In February the chief executive, Don Bennett, was dismissed by the board. In March the Tudor aircraft were again allowed to fly, initially only as freighters. In the financial year April 1947 – March 1948, the Corporation made a loss of £421,481. The Tudor returned to passenger service on 18 August, with a new service to Kingston, Jamaica. In December the Tudors replaced the Avro Lancastrian on routes to Havana, Cuba, and to the west coast of South America. From September 1948 the airline based Avro Tudors at Wunstorf to support the Berlin Airlift, mainly by each carrying 2,300 gallons of petrol or 2,100 gallons of fuel oil; by April 1949 the airline had five aircraft operating the Airlift. By December 1948 the airline had transported over 1,000,000 gallons of petrol into Berlin from Wunstorf in over 700 flights, using mostly Tudor V tankers, each fitted with five tanks.

The airline acquired Bahamas Airways in January 1949; along with British West Indian Airways, it was to be used as a feeder airline for BSAA services in the Caribbean. On 17 January, in a repeat of the Star Tiger incident, the Tudor Star Ariel disappeared over the Atlantic on a flight from Bermuda. It had seven crew and 13 passengers. Pending investigation, the Tudors were withdrawn from service by the airline. By March 1949, with the loss of the Star Ariel unexplained, the permanent grounding of the Tudor IVs for passenger flying, and the lack of other long-range aircraft, the government proposed amalgamating the airline with BOAC. BSAA passengers to Bermuda were already being carried by BOAC aircraft via New York. The airline did have Saunders-Roe Princess flying-boats on order, but they would not be delivered until 1951, and the transfer of Canadair North Star which were on order for BOAC was considered. On 15 March, the Minister of Civil Aviation announced that BSAA and BOAC would be amalgamated.

On the passing of the Air Corporations Act 1949, British South American Airways Corporation became the South American Division of BOAC; the change became effective from 1 January 1950.

== Bases ==
The airline used Langley Airfield for maintenance before transferring all operations to London Heathrow Airport.

== Fleet ==
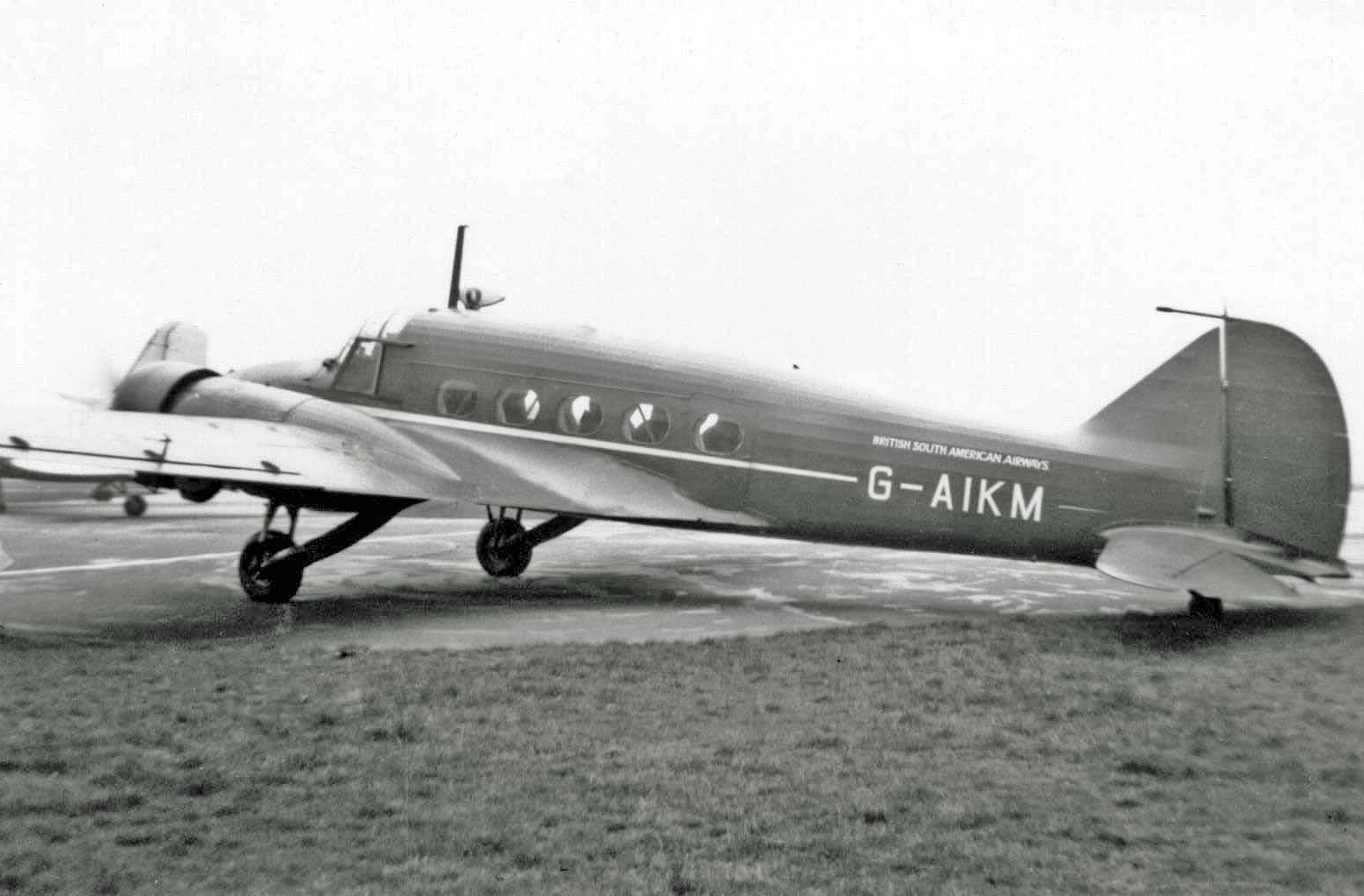
BSAAC's Avro Anson executive transport Star Visitant, wearing full titles, at Manchester Airport in 1949

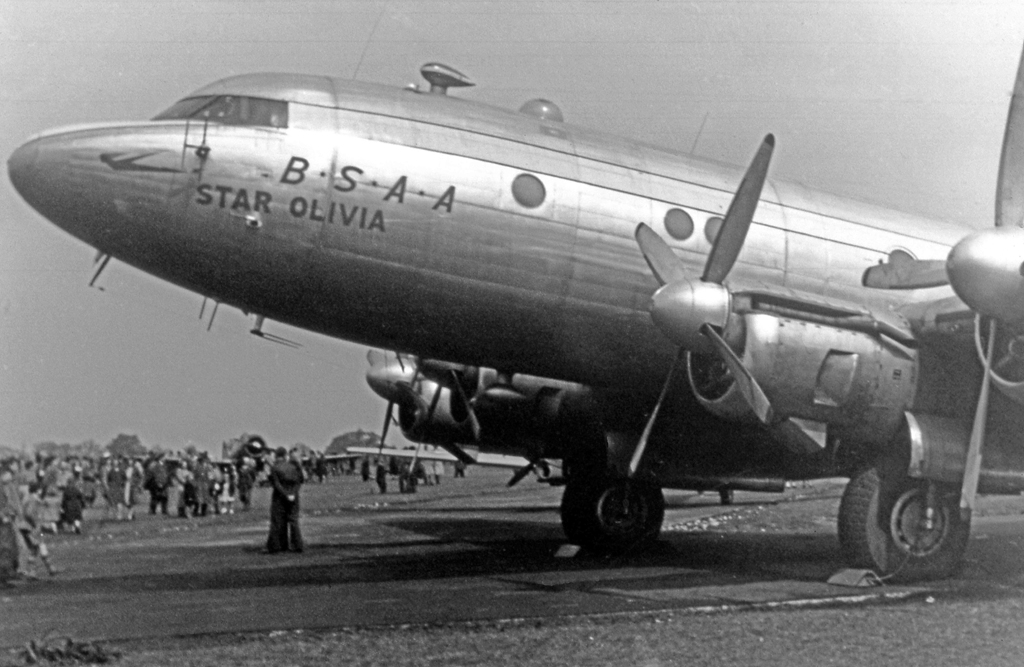
Avro 688 Tudor 4B G-AHNI BSAA Star Olivia, 1949

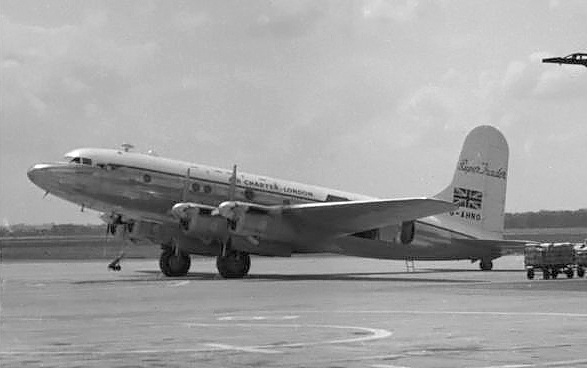
Avro 688 Tudor 4B Super Trader freighter, similar to Star Tiger and Star Ariel

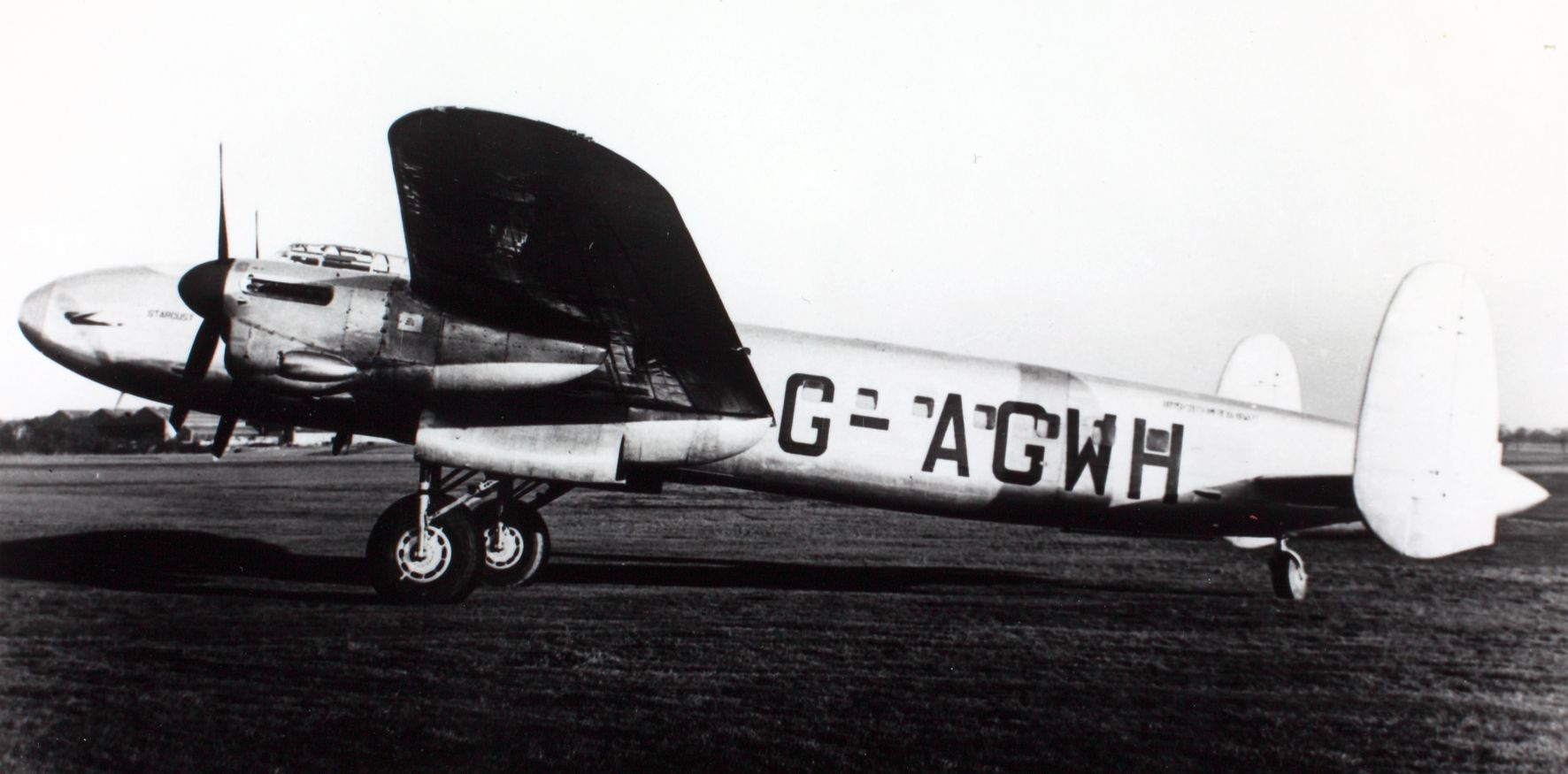
Avro Avro 691 Lancastrian 3 G-AGWH cn 1280 Stardust BSAA

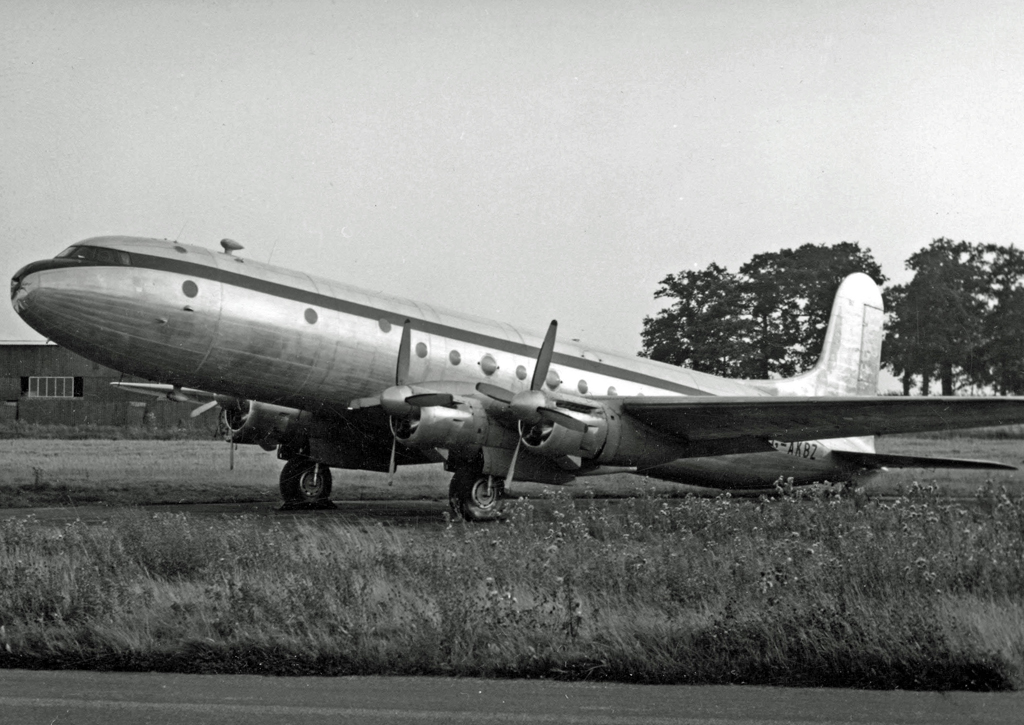
A former BSAA Tudor V in storage in 1953

- Airspeed Consul – two used as a navigation and radio trainer
- Airspeed Oxford – one used as a navigation and radio trainer
- Avro 19 Series 2 – one used for communications and crew ferry
- Avro Lancastrian 2 – two 9-passenger aircraft acquired in December 1947 and February 1948 and two bought for spares
- Avro 691 Lancastrian 3 – six 13-passenger aircraft used to start services in early 1946
- Avro 691 Lancastrian 4 – two bought in 1948 and later used on the Berlin Airlift
- Avro Lancaster Freighter – in early 1946 the airline had four four-engined Avro Lancaster bombers converted into freighters with elongated noses
- Avro Tudor Freighter 1 – two aircraft
- Avro Tudor 4 – four aircraft – 32 passenger variant; lacked a flight engineers station.
- Avro Tudor 4B – two aircraft – 32 passenger variant; retained the flight engineer station.
- Avro Tudor 5 – five aircraft – 44 passenger variant; did not enter passenger service; used as fuel freighters on Berlin Airlift
- Avro York
- Percival Proctor III – one aircraft used as a company transport and for training
- Saunders-Roe Princess – large flying boat, ordered but not built

== Incidents and accidents ==
=== Star Dust ===
On 2 August 1947, the Avro Lancastrian Star Dust disappeared on a flight from Buenos Aires, Argentina, to Santiago, Chile; fifty years later remains of the aircraft were found to have crashed into an Argentine mountain.

=== Star Tiger and Star Ariel ===
The Star Tiger and Star Ariel were Avro Tudor IV aircraft lost over the Atlantic. The loss of each without a trace, plus the unexplained disappearance of an Airport Transport DC-3 south of Miami on 27 December 1948, and the loss of United States Navy Flight 19 on 5 December 1945, led to the creation of the Bermuda Triangle myth.

Star Tiger

On 30 January 1948, Star Tiger was flying from England to Bermuda. It stopped for fuel in the Azores. Early on 31 January, the captain asked for a bearing for Bermuda. The request was routine, and there was no cause for alarm. He then gave an estimated arrival at 05:00; that was the last contact. The distance from the Azores to Bermuda is 2,230 miles (3,588 km). At 05:00 a search was launched from Bermuda, but the aircraft was not found.

Star Ariel

Star Ariel G-AGRE left Bermuda for Kingston, Jamaica, on 17 January 1949. Soon after take-off, captain John McPhee radioed a standard departure message including an estimate at Kingston of 14:10. This was followed by a position report: "I was over 30° N at 9:37 I am changing frequency to MRX." Star Ariel was never heard from again. Over 70 aircraft and many ships, including the aircraft carriers USS Kearsarge and USS Leyte, and the battleship USS Missouri, searched as far as 500 miles south of Bermuda. No debris, oil slicks, or wreckage were found. The Tudor IV was later discontinued.

=== Further accidents and incidents ===
- 7 September 1946: an Avro 685 York I registration G-AHEW named Star Leader flying from London to Buenos Aires via Lisbon, Bathurst (Banjul)-Jeshwang, Natal, Rio de Janeiro-Santos Dumont and Montevideo lost control and crashed shortly after takeoff from Bathurst. The cause of the loss of control cannot be determined with certainty, but a mishandling of the controls by the captain is the most likely explanation. All 24 occupants died.
- 30 August 1946: G-AGWJ swung off the runway on landing, and was written off
- 13 April 1947: G-AHEZ crash-landed in poor visibility at Dakar Airport, killing 6
- 5 January 1949: Avro York G-AHEX Star Venture suffered engine fire and crash-landed, killing 3 passengers
- BSAA Avro York G-AHFA Star Dale was sold to Skyways. It was lost on 2 February (1953 Skyways Avro York disappearance)

== See also ==
- Aviation in the United Kingdom
- BWIA West Indies Airways
- History of British Airways
- List of defunct airlines of the United Kingdom
