= Mordechai Louk =

Israeli adventurer

Mordechai Ben Masoud Louk
- מרדכי בן מסעוד לוק
- Born: Spanish Morocco
- Other name: Josef Dahan
- Occupations: Adventurer, spy
- Known for: Spying for Egypt, international incident in Rome
- Criminal charge: Espionage
- Criminal penalty: 10 years in prison

Mordechai Ben Masoud Louk (Hebrew: מרדכי בן מסעוד לוק; also known as Josef Dahan) was an Israeli adventurer who was convicted by Israeli courts for spying for Egypt and sentenced to 10 years in prison. He came to the focus of international attention when he was discovered by Italian authorities at the Rome airport, bound, gagged, drugged and packed in a trunk being sent to Cairo as diplomatic mail. In Rome, Louk admitted to having "spied" for Egypt and was extradited to Israel on Israel's request.

Louk arrived in Israel from Spanish Morocco in 1949 and settled in Tel Aviv. In 1961, Louk defected from the Israeli army and escaped into the Gaza Strip, leaving behind a wife and four children.
