= Los Cerrillos Airport =

Former airport that served Santiago de Chile

Los Cerrillos Airport Aeródromo Los Cerrillos
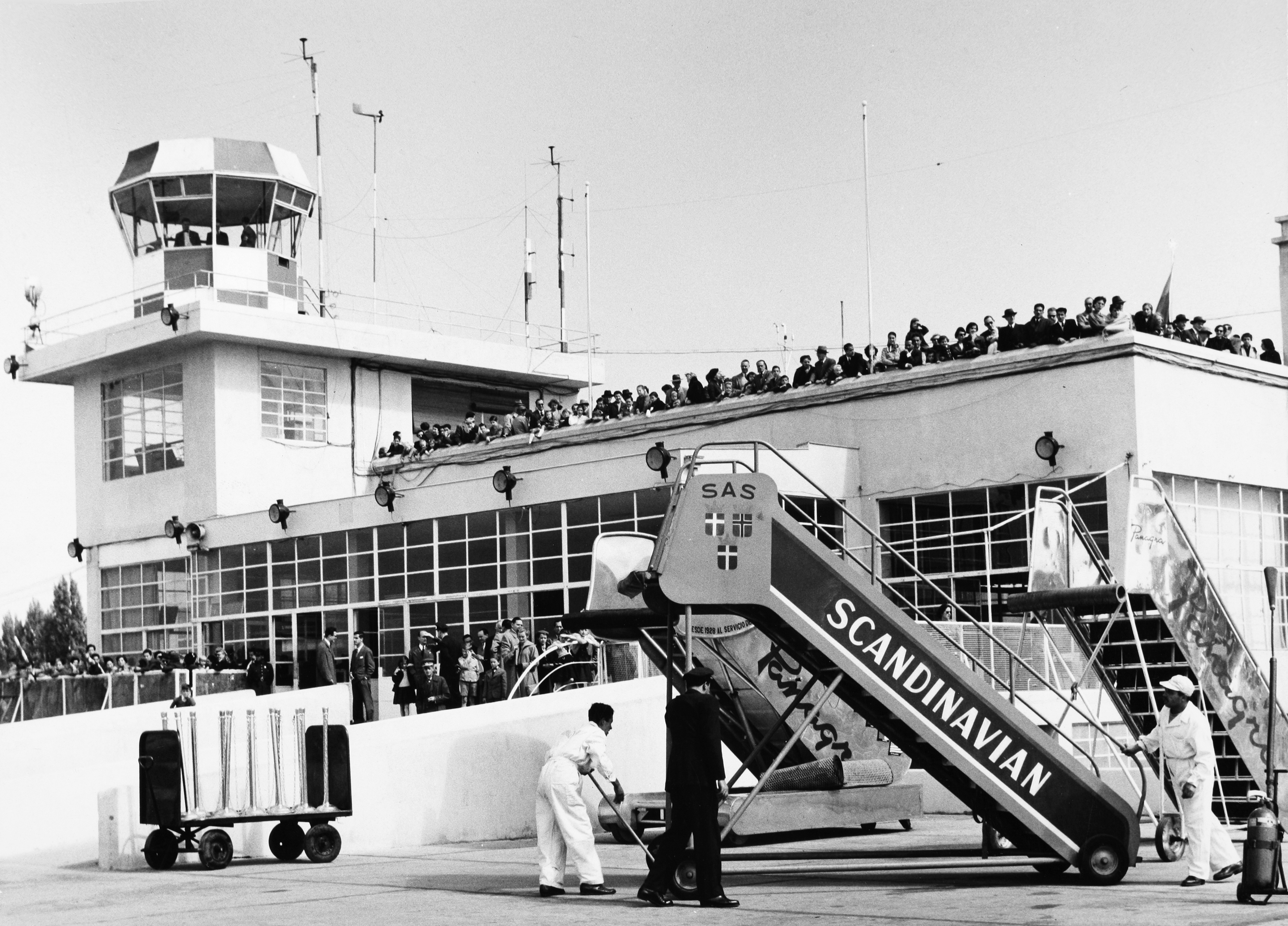
- The airport in 1951
- IATA: ~~ULC~~; ICAO: ~~SCTI~~

Summary
- Airport type: Defunct
- Serves: Santiago de Chile
- Opened: May 16, 1929
- Closed: February 8, 2006
- Passenger services ceased: February 9, 1967
- Coordinates: 33°29′37″S 70°41′52″W
- Interactive map of Los Cerrillos Airport

Los Cerrillos Airport ~~(IATA: ULC, ICAO: SCTI)~~ was the main aviation facility of Santiago, Chile until 1967, when Arturo Merino Benítez International Airport (SCL) was opened in Pudahuel.

== History ==
In 1928, the American philanthropist Daniel Guggenheim—whose brothers included Solomon Guggenheim, a patron of the arts and the first president of the Braden Copper Company—donated half a million dollars (at the time) to Chile to be used in the construction of an aerodrome in order to develop Chilean civil aviation, something that interested the Guggenheim family because of their business interests in the country.

At that time, national civil aviation was just beginning and was successfully proving itself through pioneers such as César Copetta, Luis Sánchez Besa, and Dagoberto Godoy. The following is the note left by the philanthropist:

"Today I have deposited at the National City Bank of New York five hundred thousand American gold dollars to the account of His Excellency Carlos Ibáñez del Campo, President of the Republic of Chile. This deposit has been made to carry out the plan adopted by the President for educational purposes in the science of aeronautics. Kindly notify the President accordingly." (Signed) Daniel Guggenheim

The deed of sale for the land, signed in 1929, states verbatim:

"…Mr. Manuel Véliz Rodríguez, acting on behalf of the Supreme Government, (…) accepts on behalf of the Treasury, under the terms set forth, ownership of the property subject to this purchase, which is intended for the construction of a public air-port."

=== Deed of Sale ===
The land purchased was the Los Cerrillos estate, located southwest of the capital, owned by Alfredo Riesco and previously used for the production of pasture, cereals, and alfalfa, as well as for dairy farming and its own vineyard, as recorded in agricultural guides of the time.

The aerodrome, inaugurated on 16 May 1929, and ownership was transferred in 1935 to the state-owned Línea Aérea Nacional to be used as an airport, where aircraft from all air navigation companies were permitted to remain.

After the 1939 Chillán earthquake, the Chilean Air Force (FACh) established from the airport the first airlift ever carried out in the country, using national and foreign aircraft (two Argentine, one U.S. military, one commercial aircraft from Panagra, and one German aircraft carrying medical supplies). Over 322 flights, they transported 1,181 passengers and 24 tonnes of cargo. As a result of the earthquake, new engineering standards for construction were introduced, and the Corporation for Reconstruction and Relief was created—later renamed the National Emergency Office of the Ministry of the Interior (ONEMI)—to assist those affected.

During his second presidency (1952–1958), Carlos Ibáñez del Campo ordered the construction of a national network of airports suited to the characteristics of the new and modern aircraft that would revolutionize global aviation. On 21 March 1946, a four-engine aircraft operating commercial passenger and cargo services landed at Los Cerrillos for the first time.

During the 1960 earthquake, the airport served as the coordination centre for the airlift that facilitated the delivery of supplies and aeromedical evacuations. These operations were carried out with the assistance of a large number of aircraft (23 from the FACh, six commercial aircraft, and around one hundred foreign aircraft from countries providing aid, such as the United States and Argentina). Due to the destruction of airports in southern Chile, many pilots were forced to improvise landings on partially destroyed highways.

The airport was closed in 2006.

== See also ==
- Transport in Chile
- List of airports in Chile
- 1947 BSAA Avro Lancastrian Star Dust accident
