= Triplex (espionage) =

British World War II intelligence program that opened neutral diplomatic pouches

Triplex or XXX was the code name of a British espionage operation in World War II which involved secretly copying the contents of diplomatic pouches of neutral countries. It is still highly classified in Britain, and the only documents from it are in Moscow, where they were sent by Anthony Blunt, who was a supervisor of the Triplex operation while working for MI5.

Due to travel security restrictions to and from Great Britain during some periods of the war, the government was able to forbid the use of the embassies' own couriers to transport pouches or was able to separate the courier from the pouch to "censor" the passenger. This provided opportunities to access the pouch and copy the contents for later analysis.
