= Vienna Convention on Diplomatic Relations =

1961 international treaty

- Ratifications of the convention Parties Non-parties
- Signed: 18 April 1961
- Location: Vienna
- Effective: 24 April 1964
- Condition: Ratification by 22 states
- Signatories: 61
- Parties: 193 (as of June 2021)
- Depositary: UN Secretary-General
- Languages: Chinese, English, French, Russian and Spanish

Full text
- Vienna Convention on Diplomatic Relations at Wikisource

The Vienna Convention on Diplomatic Relations of 1961 is an international treaty that defines a framework for diplomatic relations between independent countries. Its aim is to facilitate "the development of friendly relations" among governments through a uniform set of practices and principles; most notably, it codifies the longstanding custom of diplomatic immunity, in which diplomatic missions are granted privileges that enable diplomats to perform their functions without fear of coercion or harassment by the host country. The Vienna Convention is a cornerstone of modern international relations and international law and is almost universally ratified and observed; it is considered one of the most successful legal instruments drafted under the United Nations.

== History ==
Throughout the history of sovereign states, diplomats have enjoyed a special status. The principle of diplomatic immunity dates back to ancient times, when Greek and Roman governments granted special status to envoys. This basic concept has endured and continued to evolve over the centuries, remaining an important element of foreign relations up to the present day. Their function to negotiate agreements between states demands certain special privileges. An envoy from another nation is traditionally treated as a guest, their communications with their home nation treated as confidential, and their freedom from coercion and subjugation by the host nation treated as essential.

The first attempt to codify diplomatic immunity into diplomatic law occurred with the Congress of Vienna in 1815. This was followed much later by the Convention regarding Diplomatic Officers (Havana, 1928).

The present treaty on the treatment of diplomats was the outcome of a draft by the International Law Commission. The treaty was adopted on 18 April 1961, by the United Nations Conference on Diplomatic Intercourse and Immunities held in Vienna, Austria, and first implemented on 24 April 1964. The same Conference also adopted the Optional Protocol concerning Acquisition of Nationality, the Optional Protocol concerning the Compulsory Settlement of Disputes, the Final Act and four resolutions annexed to that Act. One notable aspect which arose from the 1961 treaty was the establishment of the Holy See's diplomatic immunity status with other nations.

Two years later, the United Nations adopted a closely related treaty, the Vienna Convention on Consular Relations.

== Summary of provisions ==
The Vienna Convention is an extensive document, containing 53 articles. The following is a basic overview of its key provisions.

- The host nation can at any time and for any reason declare a particular member of the diplomatic staff to be persona non grata. The sending state must recall this person within a reasonable period, otherwise, this person may lose their diplomatic immunity (Article 9).
- The premises of a diplomatic mission are inviolable and must not be entered by the host country except by permission of the head of the mission; likewise, the host country must never search the premises, may not seize its documents or property, and must protect the mission from intrusion or damage (Article 22). Article 30 extends this provision to the private residence of diplomatic agents.
- The archives and documents of a diplomatic mission are inviolable and shall not be seized or opened by the host government (Article 24).
- The host country must permit and protect free communication between the diplomatic agents of the mission and their home country. A diplomatic bag must never be opened, even on suspicion of abuse, and a diplomatic courier must never be arrested or detained (Article 27).
- Diplomatic agents must not be liable to any form of arrest or detention, and the receiving state must make all efforts to protect their person and dignity (Article 29).
- Diplomatic agents are immune from the civil and criminal jurisdiction of the host state, with exceptions for professional activities outside the diplomat's official functions (Article 31). Article 32 permits sending states to waive this immunity.
- Diplomatic missions are exempt from taxes (Article 34) and customs duties (Article 36).
- Family members of diplomats living in the host country have many of the same protections as the diplomatic agents themselves (Article 37).
- Diplomatic agents must not interfere in the internal affairs of the host country, and must respect the laws of the host country (Article 41).

== Optional protocols ==
The same year the treaty was adopted, two protocols were added as amendments; countries may ratify the main treaty without necessarily ratifying these optional agreements.

- Concerning acquisition of nationality. The head of the mission, the staff of the mission, and their families, shall not acquire the nationality of the receiving country.
- Concerning compulsory settlement of disputes. Disputes arising from the interpretation of this treaty may be brought before the International Court of Justice.

== States parties to the convention ==
States which have ratified the convention UN member states which are not parties

As of June 2021, there are 193 state parties to the Vienna Convention, including all UN member states—with the exceptions of Palau and South Sudan—and the UN observer states of the Holy See and State of Palestine. The Republic of China signed and ratified the convention on 18 April 1961 and 19 December 1969, respectively, prior to the UN granting China's seat to the People's Republic of China. There are no states that have signed the treaty but not ratified it.

== See also ==
- Precedence among European monarchies
- Protection of Diplomats Convention
- Vienna Convention on Consular Relations (1963)
- Vienna Convention on the Law of Treaties (1969)
- Vienna Convention on the Law of Treaties between States and International Organizations or between International Organizations (1986)
