= Diplomatic bag =

Transported package of a diplomatic mission, exempt from inspection or seizure

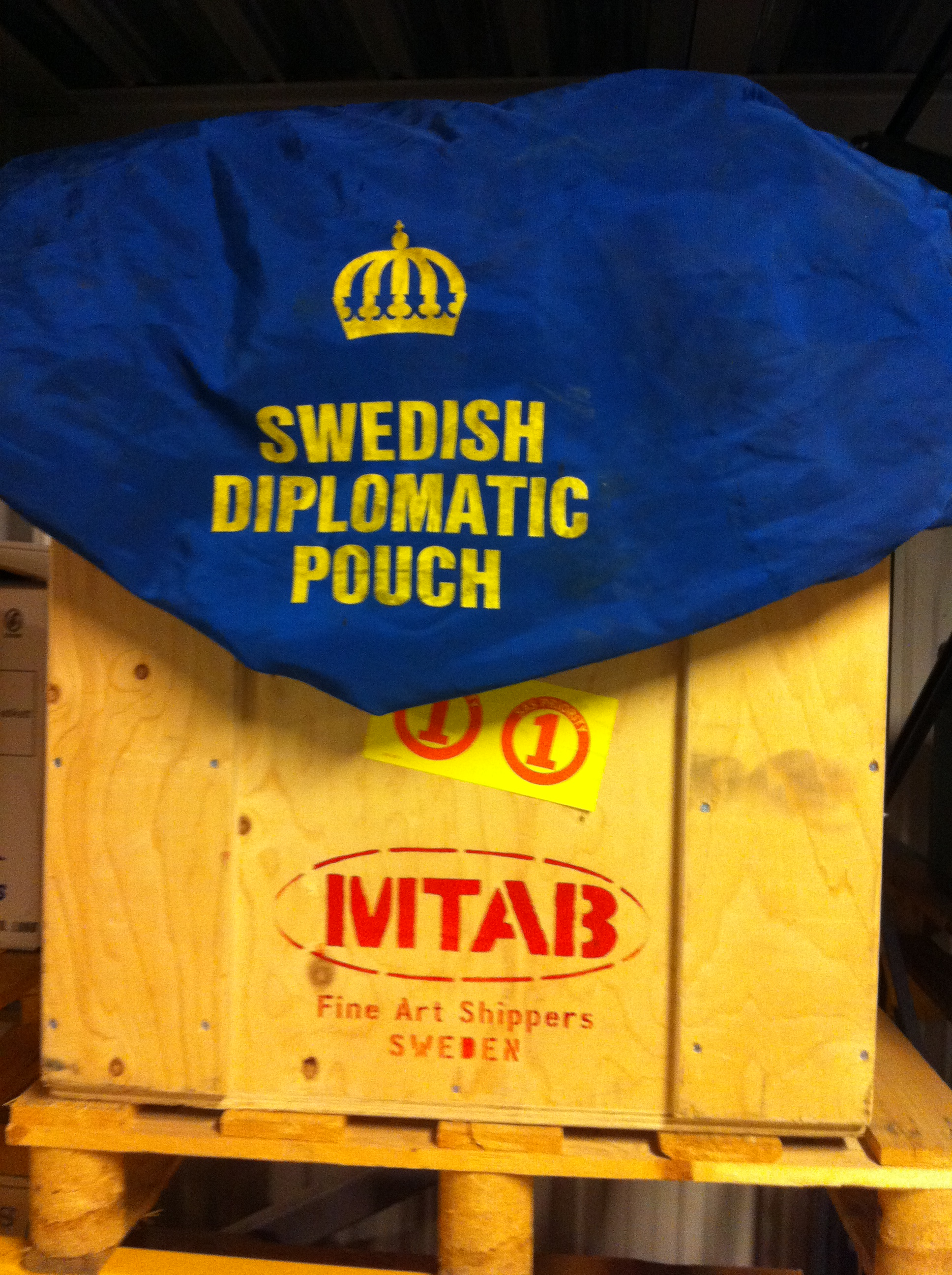
A Swedish diplomatic pouch

A diplomatic bag, also known as a diplomatic pouch or under its French name valise diplomatique, is a container with certain legal protections used for carrying official correspondence or other items between a diplomatic mission and its home government or other diplomatic, consular, or otherwise official entity. The physical concept of a "diplomatic bag" is flexible and it can take many forms (e.g., a cardboard box, briefcase, duffel bag, large suitcase, crate or even a shipping container).

Additionally, a diplomatic bag usually has some form of lock or tamper-evident seal attached to it to deter or detect interference by unauthorized third parties. The most important point is that as long as it is externally marked to show its status, the container has diplomatic immunity from search or seizure, as codified in article 27 of the 1961 Vienna Convention on Diplomatic Relations. It may only contain articles intended for official use, though there have been numerous cases where the privileges of the diplomatic bag have been used to facilitate smuggling. Bags are often escorted by a diplomatic courier, who is similarly immune from arrest and detention.

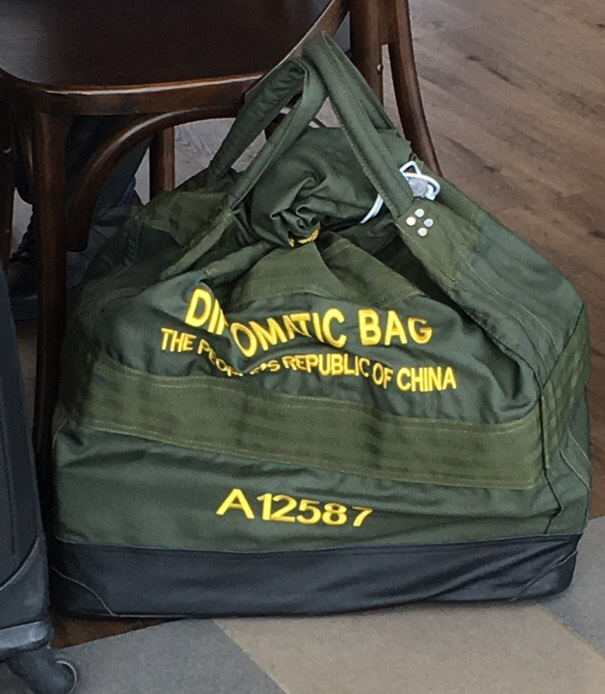
A Chinese diplomatic bag

== Noteworthy shipments ==
- During World War II, Winston Churchill reportedly received shipments of Cuban cigars by this method.
- Triplex was a British espionage operation in World War II which involved secretly copying the contents of diplomatic pouches of neutral countries.
- In 1964, a Moroccan-born Israeli double agent named Mordechai Louk was drugged, bound, and placed in a diplomatic mailing crate at the Egyptian Embassy in Rome, but was rescued by Italian authorities. The box that he had been sealed into "had almost certainly been used before for human cargo," including possibly for an Egyptian military official who had defected to Italy several years before but then disappeared without a trace before reappearing under Egyptian custody and facing trial.
- The Canadian government sent Canadian passports and other material via a diplomatic bag to Tehran to assist in the exfiltration of six American diplomats who had evaded capture during the seizure of the United States embassy.
- During the 1982 Falklands War, the Argentine government used a diplomatic bag to smuggle several limpet mines to their embassy in Spain, to be used in the covert Operation Algeciras, in which Argentine agents were to blow up a British warship in the Royal Navy Dockyard at Gibraltar. The plot was uncovered and stopped by the Spanish police before the explosives could be set.
- In the 1984 Dikko Affair, a former Nigerian government minister, Umaru Dikko, was kidnapped and placed in a shipping crate in an attempt to transport him from the London back to Nigeria for trial. However, it was not marked as a diplomatic bag, which allowed British customs to open it at London Stansted Airport.
- In 1984, the Sterling submachine gun used to kill WPC Yvonne Fletcher from inside the Libyan Embassy in London was smuggled out of the UK in one of 21 diplomatic bags.
- In March 2000, Zimbabwe became the object of international political attention when it opened a British diplomatic shipment.
- In May 2008, a replacement pump for the toilet on the International Space Station was sent in a diplomatic pouch from Russia to the United States to arrive before liftoff of the next shuttle mission.
- In 2012, a 16-kilogram (35 lb) shipment of cocaine was sent to the United Nations in New York in a bag disguised as a diplomatic pouch.
- In January 2012, Italy detected 40 kilograms (88 lb) of cocaine smuggled in a diplomatic pouch from Ecuador, arresting five. Ecuador insisted it had inspected the shipment for drugs at the foreign ministry before it was sent to Milan.
- In November 2013, the UK government alleged that a British diplomatic bag had been opened by the Guardia Civil at the Gibraltar-Spanish border, sparking a formal diplomatic protest. The Spanish government responded that the bag, being transported from the Governor of Gibraltar by a courier company, and contained in a mailbag that held other packages, did not meet the criteria of being in transit between a diplomatic mission and a home government.
- In July 2020, Indian officials detected 30 kilograms (66 lb) of gold smuggled in a concealed diplomatic consignment from the United Arab Emirates, which was seized at Thiruvananthapuram Airport in Kerala by the Indian Customs Department. India's National Investigation Agency revealed that former local UAE consulate employees were involved in gold smuggling.

== See also ==
- List of government and military acronyms
- Military mail
- Diplomatic cable
- Diplomatic immunity
