= Diplomatic courier =

Diplomatic official

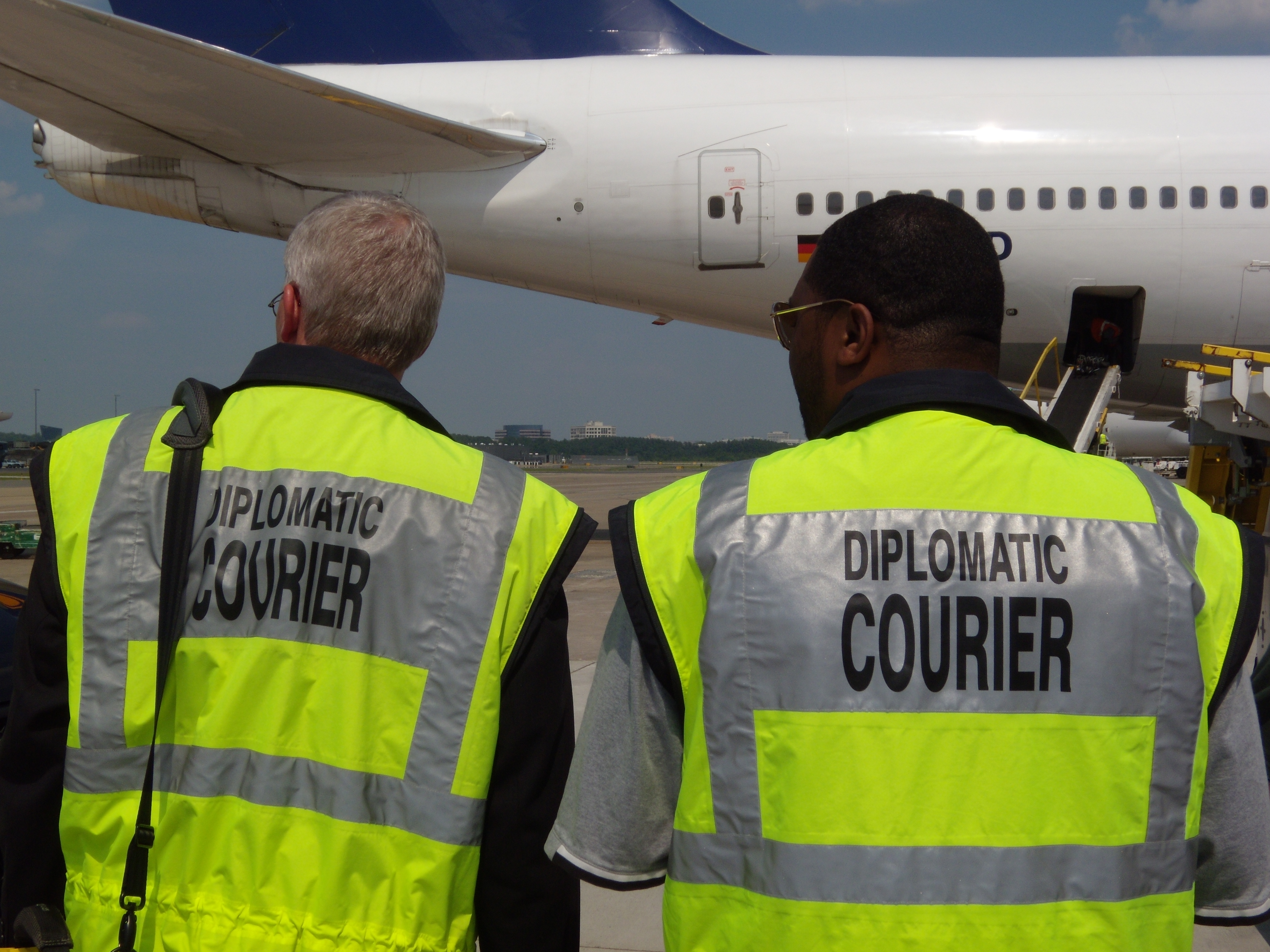
Diplomatic couriers inspecting the unloading of diplomatic bags

A diplomatic courier is an official who secures and transports diplomatic bags. Countries have utilized diplomatic couriers to handle important documents, artifacts and supplies between different countries since the 12th century. Following the 1961 Vienna Convention on Diplomatic Relations, couriers are placed under diplomatic immunity while performing their work. Couriers are usually hired by a specific country and are tasked with protecting and managing bags from being opened. Some couriers are assigned on an ad hoc basis, but in those cases they are released from immunity once their bags have been delivered. The original definition of a diplomatic courier focuses on handling bags, but couriers today also deal with logistical affairs and digital communications.

== History ==
The first appearance of a diplomatic courier was in the 12th century, when English kings created the King's Messengers to relay secret information or deliveries. King's Messengers were used during the reign of Richard III; he used the King's Messengers' four couriers to deliver private papers in 1485. After continued frustrations with postal systems in the 1500s, some Italian states hired independent freelance messengers to deliver documents between countries, and hiring them as full time couriers. Countries like Spain and France adopted the practice soon after. Couriers in the 1500s were generally assigned to a specific route, such as delivering messages from Paris to London to communicate across the English Channel.

Article 27 of the Vienna Convention on Diplomatic Relations formalized the diplomatic courier, declaring "A diplomatic bag must never be opened, even on suspicion of abuse, and a diplomatic courier must never be arrested or detained." Despite diplomatic immunity, the position has been abused and couriers have been stopped on occasion for issues regarding their bags. Dutch, Swiss and American couriers were detained in China following disputes over their corresponding bags in 1981. Other countries have abused the legal position of couriers for non-diplomatic reasons, such as in Russia to arrest the wife of a defecting official.

== United Kingdom ==
During the turn of the 19th century, the King's Messengers were moved under the Foreign Office, now taking on the modern role of accompanying packages and prevent external tampering of those packages. Although there are still King's Messengers today, most packages today are handled under the Foreign and Commonwealth Office, transported unaccompanied by the FCDOS Secure Logistics service.

== United States ==
In 1916, the United States established the Diplomatic Security Service, inspired by the King's Messengers. President Wilson created the organization, tasked with delivering and securing diplomatic documents during World War I. The first courier was Amos J. Peaslee, tasked with sending confidential documents from Paris to Washington, D.C. After the war, courier deliveries were transferred to the State Department, creating the Diplomatic Courier Service which continued to deliver important documents and materials into World War II.

By the 1950s, diplomatic couriers became common during the Cold War to deliver information across the Iron Curtain. Allied countries would sometimes coordinate travel with other couriers from allied countries traveling towards the same destination, such as on the Orient Express, with some in the same sleeping arrangements to save on travel time and for security reasons to keep payloads intact.

As of 2022, American diplomatic couriers are also involved in logistical affairs, from flight planning to resource management. Couriers are stationed around the world, acting as diplomatic liaisons and security guards for various operations, for example aiding in moving supplies during the withdrawal of American troops from Afghanistan. The Diplomatic Courier Service transported 116,351 items weighing approximately 5,353,000 pounds in 2017. The service's only incident involving an item that failed to reach its destination occurred in 1919, when a baby grand piano was lost during transit aboard the Orient Express. Couriers are trained for roughly twelve to fourteen weeks in Washington, D.C., and during their careers may be assigned to one of various offices around the world.
