= Avro Lancastrian =

1943 transport aircraft family by Avro

Lancastrian
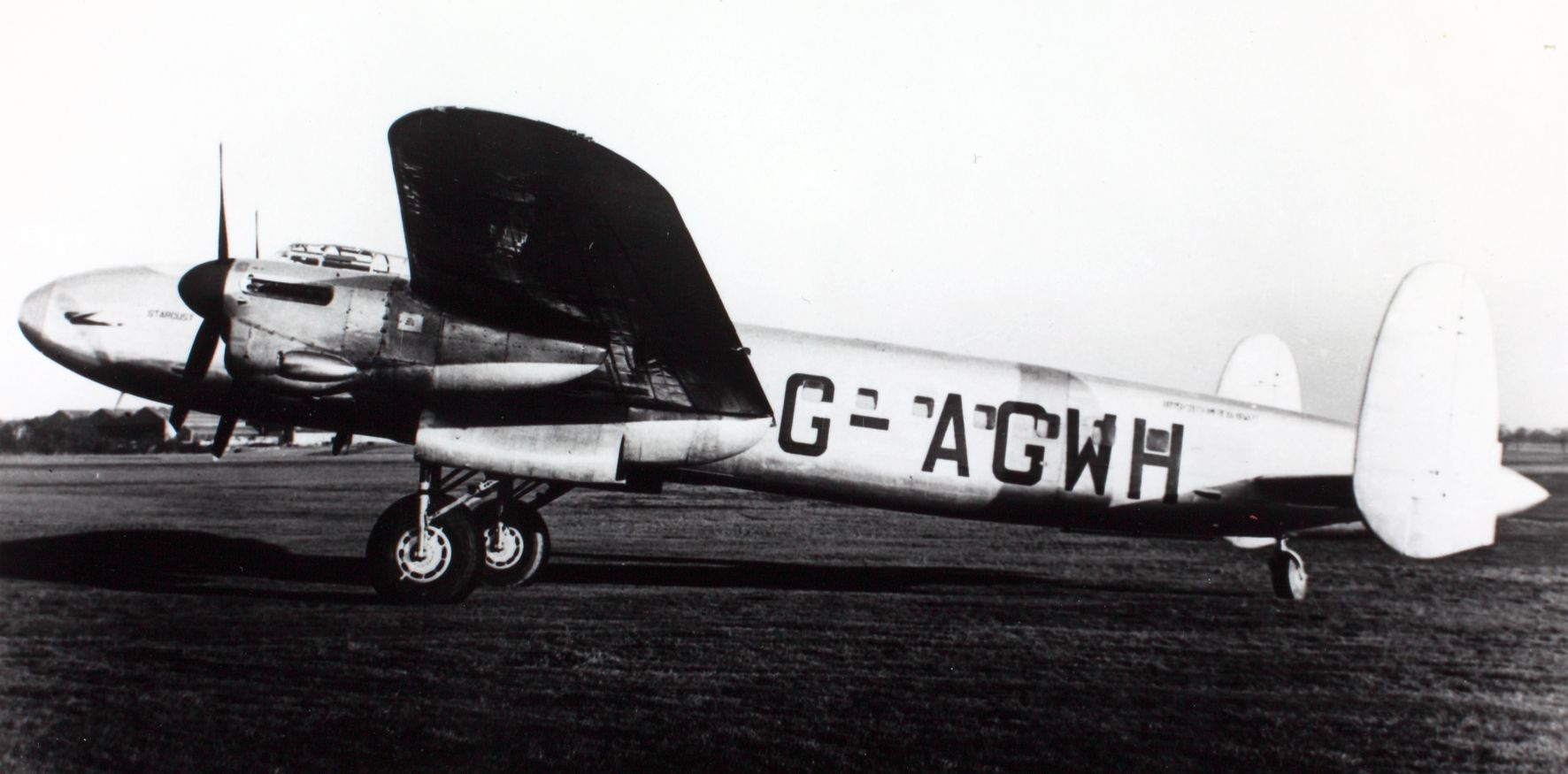
- Avro Avro 691 Lancastrian 3 G-AGWH cn 1280 'Stardust' BSAA (British South American Airways)

General information
- Type: Passenger and mail transport
- Manufacturer: Avro
- Primary users: BOAC Trans Canada Airlines; Alitalia; Royal Air Force; Rolls-Royce (engine test-beds)
- Number built: 91 (including conversions)

History
- Manufactured: 1943–1945
- Introduction date: 1945 (BOAC)
- First flight: 1943
- Retired: 1960
- Developed from: Avro Lancaster

The Avro 691 Lancastrian was a British and Canadian passenger and mail transport aircraft of the 1940s and 1950s developed from the Avro Lancaster heavy bomber. The Lancastrian was basically a modified Lancaster bomber without armour or armament and with the gun turrets replaced by streamlined metal fairings, including a new nose section. The initial batch was converted directly from Lancasters; later batches were new builds.

== Design and development ==
In 1943, Canada's Victory Aircraft converted a Lancaster X bomber for civilian transport duties with Trans-Canada Airlines (TCA). (After the war Victory Aircraft was purchased by what became Avro Canada). This conversion was a success, resulting in eight additional Lancaster Xs being converted. The "specials" were powered by Packard-built Merlin 38 engines and featured a lengthened, streamlined nose and tail cone. Range was increased by two 400 gal (1,818 L) Lancaster long-range fuel tanks fitted as standard in the bomb bay. These Lancastrians were used by TCA on its Montreal–Prestwick route.

The modification of abundant military aircraft into desperately needed civilian transports was common in the United Kingdom in the immediate postwar period; the Handley Page Halton was a similar conversion of the Halifax heavy bomber.

== Operational history ==
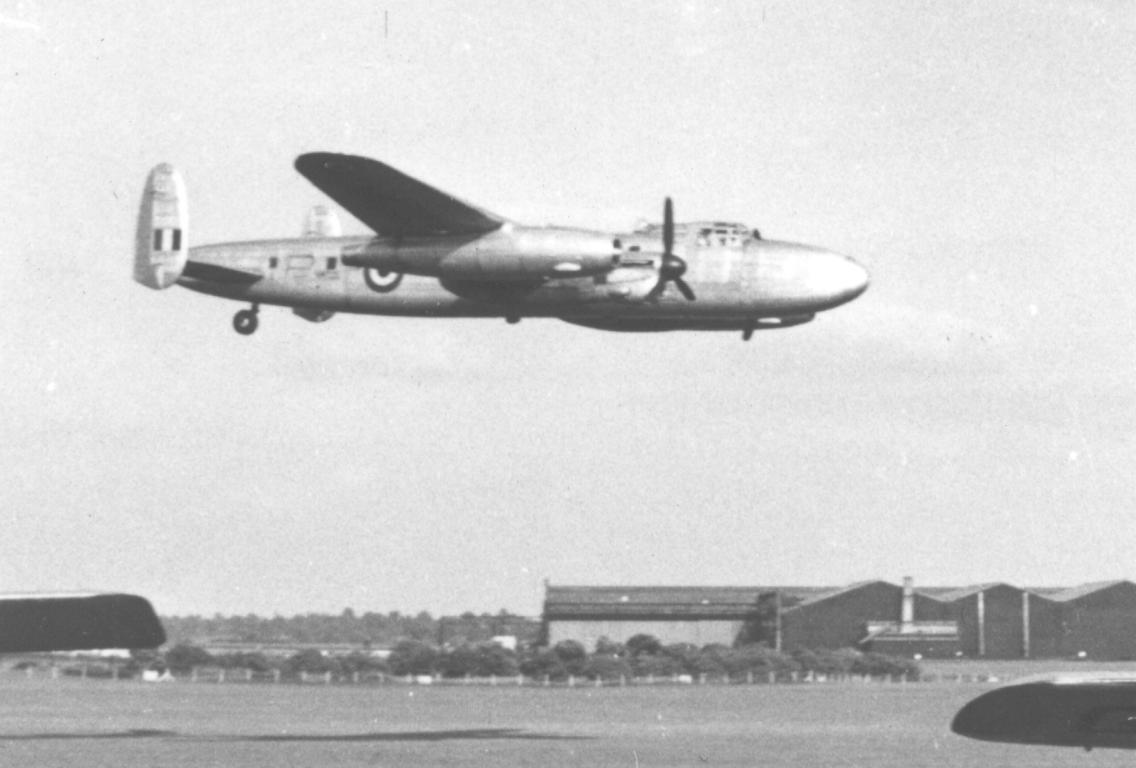
Avro Sapphire Lancastrian testbed demonstrating on its two jets with its Merlins feathered at Coventry Airport in June 1954

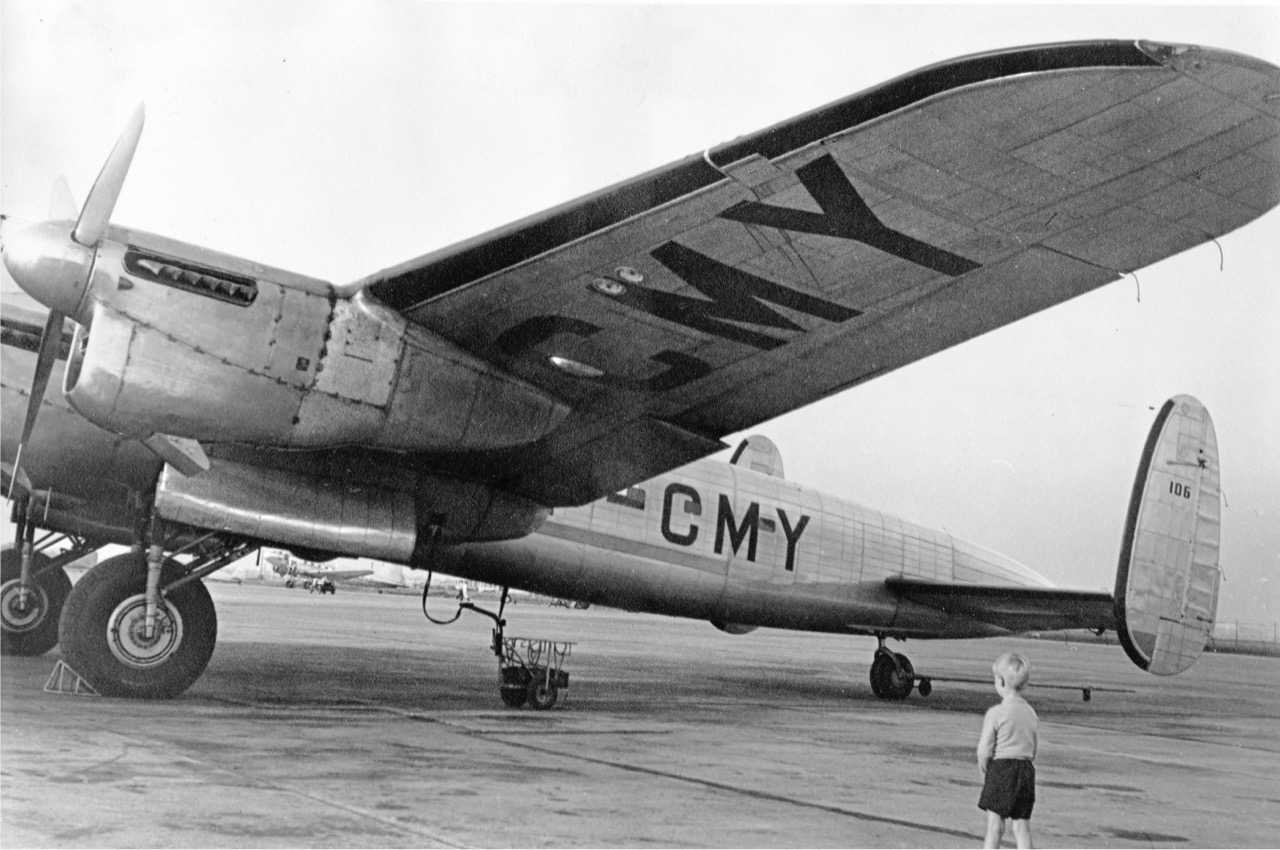
A Lancastrian at St. Hubert airstrip, Montreal. 1947

In 1945, deliveries commenced of 30 British-built Lancastrians for BOAC. On a demonstration flight on 23 April 1945, G-AGLF flew 13,500 mi (21,700 km) from England to Auckland, New Zealand in three days, 14 hours at an average speed of 220 mph (354 km/h).

The Lancastrian was fast, had a long range, and was capable of carrying a heavy load, but space inside was very limited as the Lancaster had been designed with space for its seven crew dispersed throughout the fuselage, and with the majority of the load being carried in the 33 ft (10.05 m) long bomb bay. Consequently, as passengers are bulky but low in weight, it was not suited to carry large numbers of passengers, but was suitable for mail and a small number of VIP passengers. BOAC used it for flights between England and Australia from 31 May 1945. It also served with the RAF; RAF Lancaster I serial number PD328, was converted to a Lancastrian and renamed Aries, as well as serving with Qantas and Flota Aérea Mercante Argentina.

15 Lancastrians made over 5,000 trips during the Berlin Airlift to transport petrol. In 1946 a Lancastrian operated by BSAA was the first aircraft to make a scheduled flight from the then-newly opened London Heathrow Airport.

=== Lancastrian engine testbeds ===
Data from: Avro Aircraft since 1908

With the advent of gas turbine engines there emerged a need to test the new engines in a controlled flight environment in well instrumented installations. An ideal candidate emerged as the Avro Lancastrian which could easily accommodate the test instrumentation as well as fly on the power of two piston engines if required. Several Lancastrians were allocated for engine test-bed work with turbojet engines replacing the outer Merlin engines or test piston engines in the inner nacelles. Fuel arrangements varied but could include kerosene jet fuel in outer wing tanks or fuselage tanks, with avgas carried in remaining fuel tanks.

Name	Serial	Test engine	First flight	Notes
Nene-Lancastrian	VH742	2x Rolls-Royce Nene	14 August 1946	Flew the first international all-jet passenger flight from London to Paris on 23 November 1946.
Nene-Lancastrian	VH737	2x Rolls-Royce Nene		
Avon-Lancastrian	VM732	2x Rolls-Royce Avon		
Avon-Lancastrian	VL970	2x Rolls-Royce Avon		Latterly used to test the Rolls-Royce Avon 502 civil turbojet for the de Havilland Comet 2 airliner.
Ghost-Lancastrian	VM703	2x de Havilland Ghost 50 + 2x Walter HWK 109-500 RATOG packs	24 July 1947	Testing the engines and takeoff-boost system proposed for the de Havilland Comet 1 airliner
Ghost-Lancastrian	VM729	2x de Havilland Ghost 50		Used for afterburner research and later development and certification of the Ghost 50 for the Comet 1a
Sapphire-Lancastrian	VM733	2x Armstrong Siddeley Sapphire	18 January 1950	
Griffon-Lancastrian	VM704	2x Rolls-Royce Griffon 57 inboard		Used for testing the Griffon installation for the Avro Shackleton
Griffon-Lancastrian	VM728	2x Rolls-Royce Griffon 57 inboard		Used for testing the Griffon installation for the Avro Shackleton
Merlin 600-Lancastrian	VM704	2x Rolls-Royce Merlin 600		Used for testing the civil Merlin 600-series for use in the Canadair C4M and Avro Tudor

== Accidents and incidents ==
The Aviation Safety Network, part of the Flight Safety Foundation, records 23 hull loss accidents involving the Lancastrian occurring between 1946 and 1964 resulting in a total of 81 fatalities.

Notable accidents include:

Lancastrian G-AGLX

On 23 March 1946 Lancastrian G-AGLX was lost over the Indian Ocean en route between British Ceylon and Cocos (Keeling) Islands. All 10 on board died.

Lancastrian G-AGWH, Star Dust

On 2 August 1947 Lancastrian G-AGWH Star Dust of British South American Airways was lost in the Andes en route from Buenos Aires, Argentina, to Santiago, Chile. The probable cause of the crash was a navigation error due to the unknown effect of the fast-moving jetstream.

Lancastrian T-102

On 11 December 1960 Lancastrian T-102 of the Argentine Air Force crashed near San Andrés de Giles, Argentina. All 31 on board were killed. This was the worst accident involving this type of aircraft.

== Variants ==
Lancaster XPP
Nine built by converting Lancaster Mk. Xs at Victory Aircraft Ltd Canada.
Lancastrian C.1
Nine-seat transport aircraft for BOAC and Qantas. Royal Air Force designation Lancastrian C.1 to Specification 16/44. A total of 23 built by Avro
Lancastrian C.2
Nine-seat military transport aircraft for the RAF. A total of 33 built by Avro
Lancastrian 3
13-seat transport aircraft for British South American Airways. A total of 18 built by Avro
Lancastrian C.4
Ten to 13-seat military transport aircraft for the RAF. Eight built by Avro

== Operators ==
=== Civil operators ===
Argentina

- Flota Aérea Mercante Argentina (FAMA) - three C.4 incorporated in 1947

Australia

- Qantas

Canada

- Trans Canada Airlines

Italy

- Alitalia – five Lancastrians operated from 1947 until 1952

United Kingdom

- British European Airways
- British Overseas Airways Corporation (BOAC)
- British South American Airways
- Flight Refuelling Ltd
- Silver City
- Skyways Limited

=== Military operators ===
Argentina

- Argentine Air Force - two C.4 ex-FAMA, incorporated in 1948

United Kingdom

- Royal Air Force
  - No. 24 Squadron RAF
  - No. 231 Squadron RAF
  - No. 232 Squadron RAF

== Specifications (Lancastrian C.1) ==
Data from Jane's All the World's Aircraft 1947, Avro Aircraft since 1908

General characteristics

- Crew: 4 + 1 cabin crew
- Capacity: 9
- Length: 76 ft 10 in (23.42 m)
- Wingspan: 102 ft (31 m)
- Height: 17 ft 10 in (5.44 m)
- Wing area: 1,297 sq ft (120.5 m^{2})
- Aspect ratio: 8.02
- Airfoil: root: NACA 23018; tip: NACA 23012
- Empty weight: 37,190 lb (16,869 kg) equipped
- Gross weight: 65,000 lb (29,484 kg) * Maximum landing weight: 58,000 lb (26,308 kg)
- Fuel capacity: 2,154 imp gal (2,587 US gal; 9,792 L) in wing tanks, with 1,020 imp gal (1,225 US gal; 4,637 L) in bomb-bay tanks
- Powerplant: 4 × Rolls-Royce Merlin 24/2 V-12 liquid-cooled piston engines, 1,620 hp (1,210 kW) each
- Propellers: 3-bladed de Havilland Hydromatic, 13 ft (4.0 m) diameter constant-speed fully-feathering propellers

Performance

- Maximum speed: 315 mph (507 km/h, 274 kn) at 58,000 lb (26,308 kg) and 12,000 ft (3,700 m)

285 mph (248 kn; 459 km/h) at sea level
300 mph (260 kn; 480 km/h) at 3,500 ft (1,100 m)

- Cruise speed: 290 mph (470 km/h, 250 kn) maximum lean mixture at 17,500 ft (5,300 m)

280 mph (240 kn; 450 km/h) at 11,000 ft (3,400 m)
245 mph (213 kn; 394 km/h) at sea level

- Range: 4,100 mi (6,600 km, 3,600 nmi) at 230 mph (200 kn; 370 km/h) and 20,000 ft (6,100 m) with 2,190 lb (993 kg) payload

3,280 mi (2,850 nmi; 5,280 km) at 280 mph (240 kn; 450 km/h) and 20,000 ft (6,100 m) with 4,340 lb (1,969 kg) payload
3,600 mi (3,100 nmi; 5,800 km) at 280 mph (240 kn; 450 km/h) and 20,000 ft (6,100 m) with 2,190 lb (993 kg) payload (maximum lean mixture)
3,200 mi (2,800 nmi; 5,100 km) at 280 mph (240 kn; 450 km/h) and 20,000 ft (6,100 m) with 4,850 lb (2,200 kg) payload (maximum lean mixture)

- Service ceiling: 24,300 ft (7,400 m)

19,000 ft (5,800 m) on three engines

- Absolute ceiling: 25,000 ft (7,600 m) at maximum continuous power

20,500 ft (6,200 m) on three engines

- Rate of climb: 970 ft/min (4.9 m/s) at 65,000 lb (29,484 kg) and 10,000 ft (3,000 m)

950 ft/min (4.8 m/s) at sea level

- Maximum rate of climb on three engines: 490 ft/min (2.5 m/s) at sea level

250 ft/min (1.3 m/s) at 15,000 ft (4,600 m)

- Wing loading: 50 lb/sq ft (240 kg/m^{2})
- Power/mass: 0.1 hp/lb (0.16 kW/kg)
- Take-off distance to 50 ft (15 m): 3,600 ft (1,100 m)
- Landing run: 1,650 ft (500 m)

== See also ==
Related development

- Avro Lancaster
- Avro York
- Avro Lincolnian very similar to Lancastrian but developed from Lincoln bomber instead of Lancaster bomber.

Aircraft of comparable role, configuration, and era

- Boeing C-108 Flying Fortress Transport B-17 Flying Fortress with minimal external changes.
- Consolidated C-87 Liberator Express Transport variant of B-24 Liberator.

Related lists

- List of aircraft of World War II
- List of aircraft of the Royal Air Force

== Bibliography ==
- Franks, Richard A. The Avro Lancaster, Manchester and Lincoln: A Comprehensive Guide for the Modeller. London: SAM Publications, 2000. ISBN 0-9533465-3-6.
- Holmes, Harry. Avro Lancaster (Combat Legend series). Shrewsbury, UK: Airlife Publishing Ltd., 2002. ISBN 1-84037-376-8.
- Jackson, A.J. Avro Aircraft since 1908, 2nd edition. London: Putnam Aeronautical Books, 1990. ISBN 0-85177-834-8.
- Mackay, R.S.G. Lancaster in action. Carrollton, Texas: Squadron/Signal Publications Inc., 1982. ISBN 0-89747-130-X.
- Marino, Atilio; Celleto, Vladimiro & Mosquera, Javier (September–October 2001). "Argentina's "Heavies": Avro Lancaster, Lincoln and Lancastrian in Military Service, Part One". Air Enthusiast. No. 95. pp. 64–70. ISSN 0143-5450.
- Milberry, Larry. The Canadair North Star. Toronto: CANAV Books, 1982. ISBN 0-07-549965-7.
- Ottaway, Susan and Ian. Fly With the Stars – A History of British South American Airways. Andover, Hampshire, UK: Speedman Press, 2007. ISBN 978-0-7509-4448-9.
- Prins, François (Spring 1994). "Pioneering Spirit: The QANTAS Story". Air Enthusiast. No. 53. pp. 24–32. ISSN 0143-5450.
- Taylor, John W. R. "Avro Lancaster." Combat Aircraft of the World from 1909 to the present. New York: G.P. Putnam's Sons, 1969. ISBN 0-425-03633-2.
