= Richard Bassett (priest) =

Welsh cleric (1777–1852)

Richard Bassett (7 November 1777 – 31 August 1852) was a Welsh cleric, thought to be the last Anglican clergyman in Wales to be associated with the Methodists.

== Life ==
Bassett was born at Tresigin, near Llantwit Major in Glamorgan, South Wales. After studying at Cowbridge Grammar School, Bassett went to Jesus College, Oxford, matriculating in 1797, but never graduating. He was ordained deacon in 1801 and priest in 1802, becoming curate of St Athan and Llandow in Glamorgan; in all, he spent over thirty years as a curate. In 1832, he became rector of Eglwys Brewis and, in 1843, vicar of Colwinston.

Bassett was friends with the evangelical cleric William Howels, and through him met the Methodist cleric David Jones of Llangan. Bassett attended Methodist meetings and associations and was a trustee of a Methodist chapel in Glamorgan, but managed to retain his position in the Church of England until his death in Colwinston on 31 August 1852. He was probably the last Anglican clergyman in Wales to be associated in such a way with the Methodists.
