= Sigingstone =

Coordinates: 51.434167°N 3.48°W

Sigingstone: Welsh: Tresigin
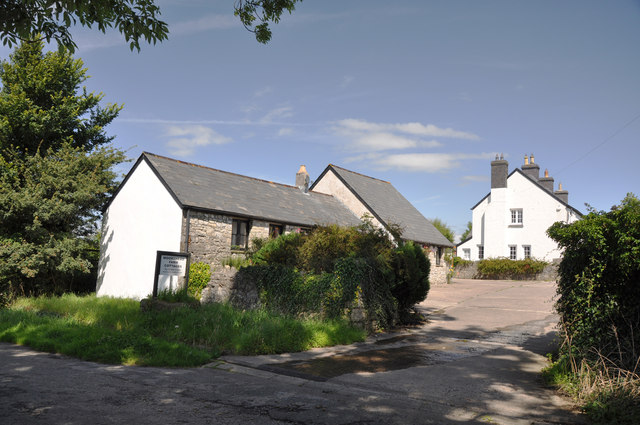

- Location within the Vale of Glamorgan
- Principal area: Vale of Glamorgan
- Preserved county: South Glamorgan
- Country: Wales
- Sovereign state: United Kingdom
- Post town: COWBRIDGE
- Postcode district: CF71
- Dialling code: 01446
- Police: South Wales
- Fire: South Wales
- Ambulance: Welsh
- UK Parliament: Vale of Glamorgan
- Senedd Cymru – Welsh Parliament: Vale of Glamorgan
- Website: https://www.sigingstone-village.org.uk

Sigingstone (Welsh: Tresigin) is a small hamlet in the Vale of Glamorgan, Wales.

It mainly consists of residential housing and two small working farms. There are two roads - one leading to the two nearby towns Llantwit Major and Cowbridge, and the other to Llanmihangel. It also has a 19th-century public house, called the Victoria Inn.

The village name is alternatively spelled "Sigginstone". This spelling is still used locally.

== Llandow Air Disaster ==
The village was the location of the 1950 Llandow Air Disaster when an Avro 689 Tudor V crashed killing 80. The aircraft was on its final approach to the nearby Llandow aerodrome.
