= Airflight =

Airline of the United Kingdom

Air Flight
- Founded: June 1948
- Commenced operations: September 1948
- Ceased operations: April 1950 (merged operations into Fairflight)
- Fleet size: 2 Avro Tudor
- Destinations: Berlin, Germany
- Key people: Don Bennett

Air Flight Limited was a British charter and cargo airline from 1948 to 1950.

== History ==
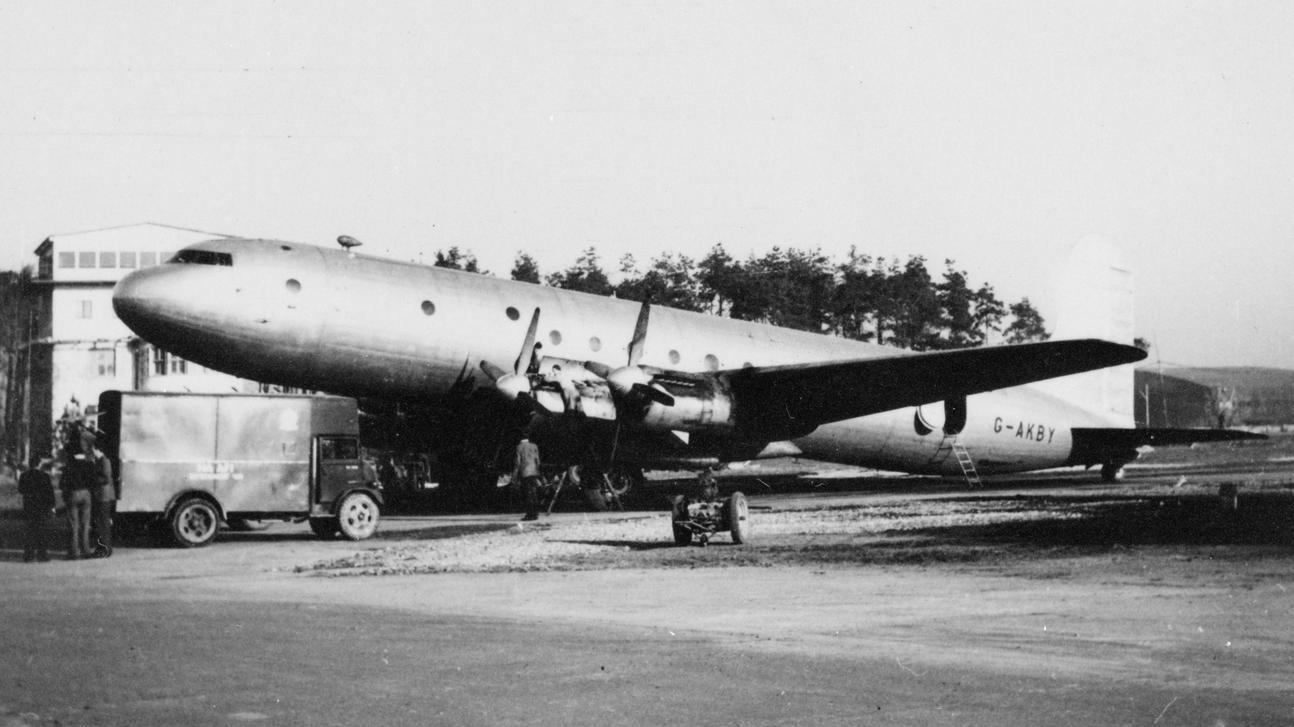
Avro Tudor G-AKBY at Wunstorf during the Berlin Airlift

=== Air Flight ===
Air Vice-Marshal Don Bennett had piloted the first British South American Airways survey flight in 1946. In spite of being a board director two bad Avro Tudor accidents forced him to leave the airline. So, in 1948 he established Air Flight Ltd. at Langley Airfield, Berkshire, to operate in the Berlin Airlift with two long-fuselage Avro Tudor aircraft. These were flown by Bennett and another pilot, WWII RAF veteran Stanley Sickelmore. Besause Bennett had the only night flight licence, he made all the trips in nighttime. One of the Tudor aircraft operated 85 sorties carrying over 9 tons of supplies per flight between Wunsdorf and Berlin Gatow airport. The Tudors proved to be some of the finest aircraft on the airlift as they could carry a greater weight of fuel than any other aircraft.

After Tudor conversion to civilian cargo and passenger carrying, on July, 24 Air Flight undertook the first revenue flight transporting fruit from Paris to Blackbushe. At the end of August permission to transport passengers was granted. But this would no longer be Air Flight's job because on the 25th of the same month Bennet legally registered another airline, Fairflight Ltd..

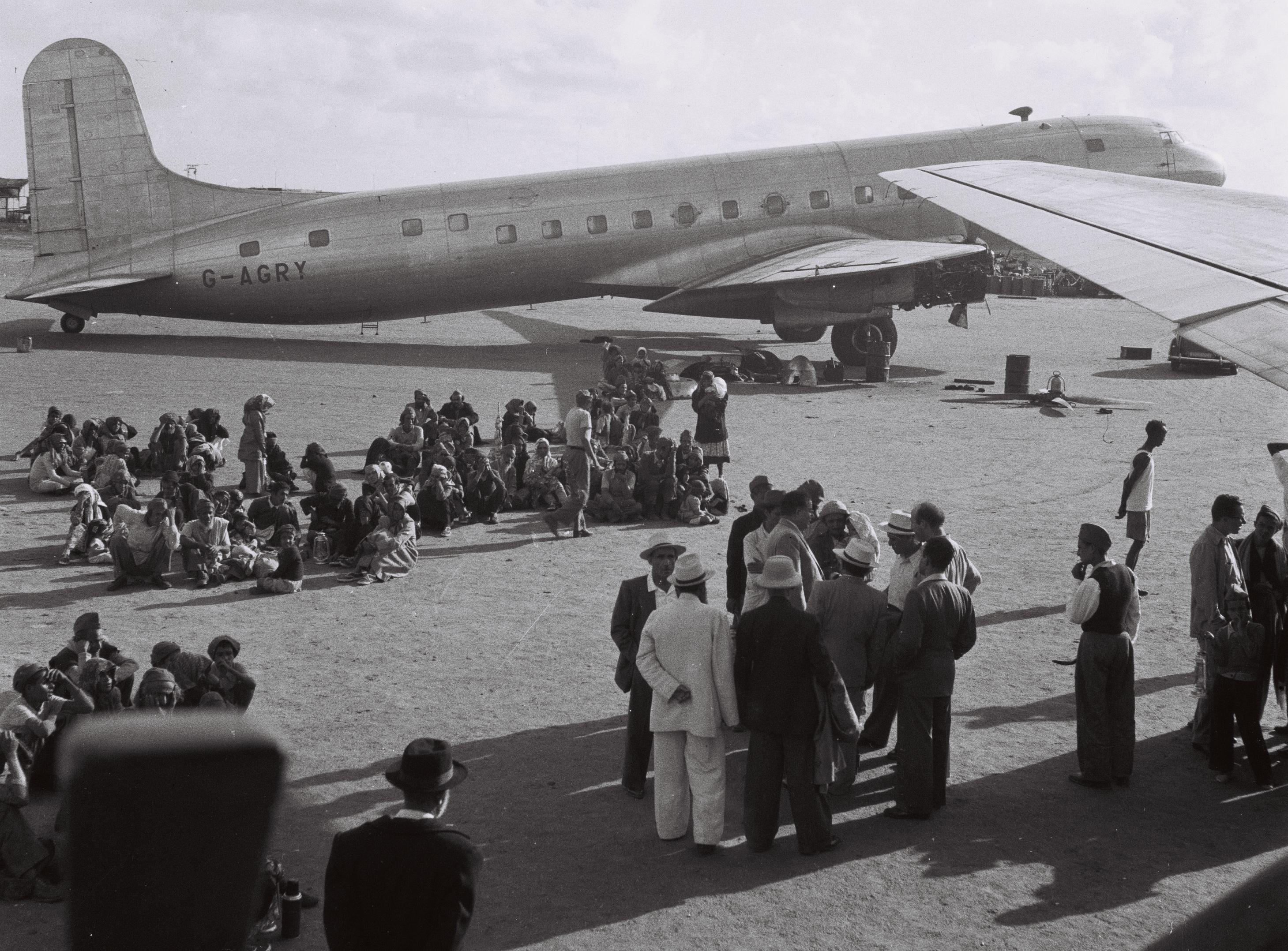
Avro Tudor 2 G-AGRY at Aden November 1949 for Operation Magic Carpet

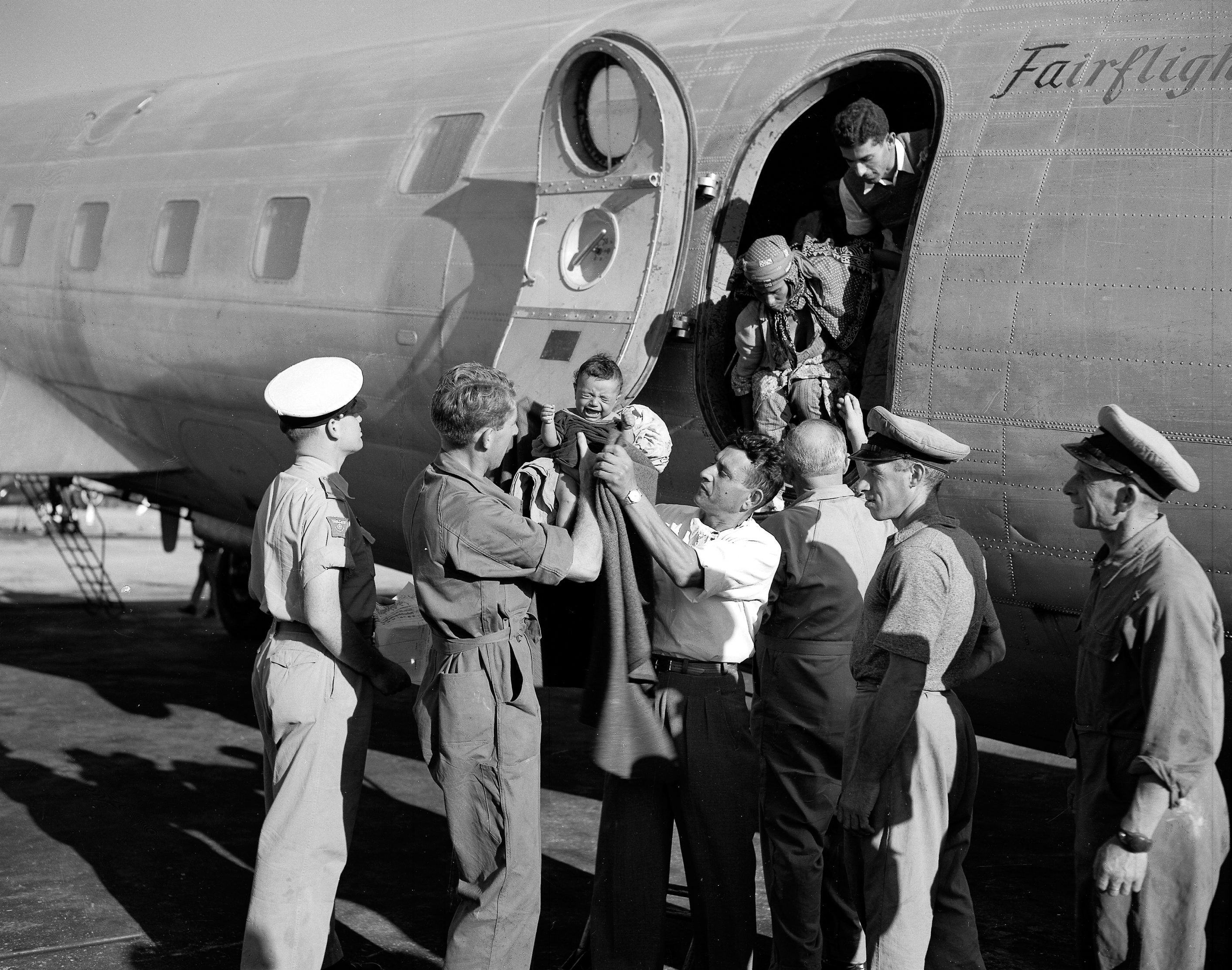
Yemeni immigrants deplaning at Lod Airport, October 1949. Note the "Fairflight" title to the right of the door

=== Fairflight ===
The operating base was moved from Langley to Blackbushe, just on time for the first flight which occurred on 28 of this same month. October 5 marked the first long-haul flight, from London Heathrow airport to Johannesburg (South Africa) with intermediate stops at Amsterdam, Geneva, Rome, Lydda (Lod), Khartoum, Malakal, Entebbe, Kasama, Lusaka, Salisbury after a three days trip. After this the Tudors were engaged in the transport of Jews who had fled Yemen and gathered in Aden (direct flights Aden-Lydda).

The Tudors were used for trooping charters to the Canal Zone for the British Government and ad hoc charters. One of these charters was to end in disaster when G-AKBY was operating a rugby charter crashed on approach to RAF Llandow (Wales) on 12 March 1950.

On April 28 Air Flight merged operations into Fairflight. In November 1951, Bennett announced that he had sold the airline to Surrey Flying Services, a subsidiary of Aviation Traders, a company owned by Freddie Laker. During 1952 Fairflight operations were gradually integrated with those of Air Charter, a small company operating out of Luton, and Surrey Flying Services and the operational merger took place in July. Air Flight itself was dissolved in 1965 and Fairflight was formally wound up in 1966.

== Fleet ==
- Avro Tudor 2 G-AGRY
- Avro Tudor 5 G-AKBY

== Accidents and incidents ==
- 12 March 1950 - Avro Tudor registered G-AKBY, operating a charter with rugby fans, crashed on approach to RAF Llandow (Wales) with 80 fatalities.

== See also ==
- List of defunct airlines of the United Kingdom
