= Hunting-Clan Air Transport =

1953–1960 British private airline

Hunting Air Transport
| IATA | ICAO | Call sign |
|---|---|---|
| HC | — | — |
- Founded: December 1945 (as Hunting Air Travel)
- Commenced operations: January 1946
- Ceased operations: 1960 (merged to form British United Airways)
- Hubs: Bovingdon Airport (1946–1955); London Airport (now London Heathrow, 1955–1960)
- Fleet size: 15 aircraft (3 Vickers Viscount 700/800 series, 9 Vickers Viking 1/1A/1B; 3 Avro 685 York) (as of April 1958)
- Destinations: British Isles, Continental Europe, Mediterranean, East Africa, Central Africa, Southern Africa, West Africa
- Parent company: Hunting-Clan Air Holdings
- Headquarters: Bovingdon Airport (1946–1955); London Airport (1955–1960)
- Key people: M.H. Curtis, E.H. Baker, Capt. L.B. Greensted, D.J. Platt, J. Robinson

Hunting-Clan Air Transport Ltd. was the registered trading name of a wholly private, British independent (Note: independent from government-owned corporations) airline that was founded in the immediate post-World War II months. It began operating on 1 January 1946 under Hunting Air Travel name. After at least a decade of significant successes, from June 1960 all operations were merged with other air carriers into British United Airways.

== History ==
=== The beginnings ===
==== Hunting Air Travel ====
Hunting Air Travel Ltd. was established at Luton Airport in December 1945 by three members of the Hunting family: Charles, Wing Commander Gerald (former Royal Flying Corps pilot during World War I) and Captain Percy Hunting, all of them with family roots in the international shipping business. They were also directors of Percival Aircraft Ltd. The airline was a subsidiary of the Hunting Group of companies, which had come from the shipping industry and could trace its history back to the 19th century. In addition to an airline operation and a maintenance organisation, the Hunting Group's other aviation interests included Percival Aircraft Ltd, Hunting Aerosurveys Ltd and Aerofilms Ltd.

The first Hunting Air Travel operating base was at Bovingdon Airport in Southeast England. Its initial activities were contract, scheduled and non-scheduled domestic and international air services with a small fleet of four Proctor aircraft, obtained through its associate, Percival Aircraft. The air company commenced operations on 1 January, 1946, making the UK’s first post-WWI air-taxi flight. The Proctors gave way to a fleet of de Havilland DH 89 Dragon Rapides and Avro 652As (Avro Nineteen), allowing regular charter flights to continental Europe. In February 1947, the company’s main base was moved to Gatwick airport, with subsidiary operations at Croydon and Nottingham. This move coincided with the delivery of Hunting’s first two modern aircraft, a Vickers Viking and a DH.104 de Havilland Dove, permitting major expansions of its charters such as regular summer trips to the Channel Islands on various travel agents behalf. The Vikings carried out numerous passenger and freight charters, some of which took the aircraft as far afield as Nairobi and Johannesburg.

On 1 November 1948, Hunting commenced a regular weekly service between London and Dar-es-Salaam (Tanganyika) on behalf of the Overseas Food Corporation. Other lucrative business derived from a series of charters to the Middle East, carrying personnel and equipment on behalf of various oil companies. In 1949 a series of regular pilgrim flights between Dublin and Rome were offered at 50% of the normal scheduled fare. Hunting’s first truly scheduled operation resulted from a BEA Associate Agreement for passenger services between London and Strasbourg, flown continuously between July and September 1950. With eight Vikings and a single Douglas Dakota on strength, to better reflect the widening scope of its activities the company’s name was changed to Hunting Air Transport Ltd. in August 1951. By that time, the airline had emerged as one of the healthiest and most securely financed independent airlines in U.K.

==== Hunting Air Transport ====
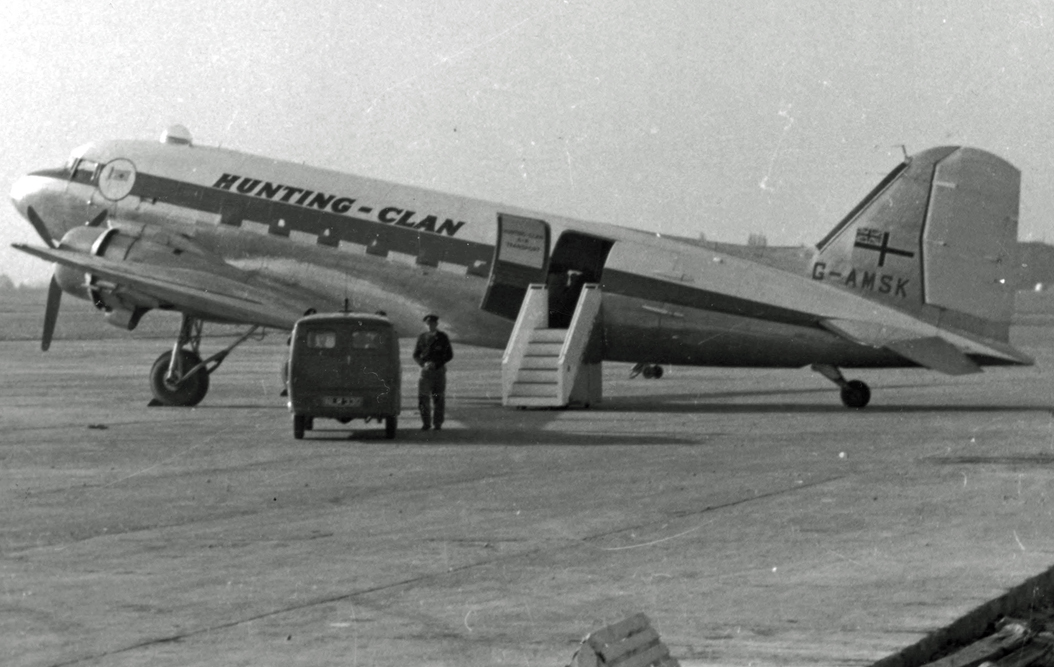
Douglas DC 3 at Manchester Airport in 1954

On June 14, 1952, a Viking departed on the inaugural flight of what was to become the famous low-cost Safari service to Nairobi (Kenya). The Safari/Colonial Coach Service from London to Nairobi routed via Malta, Wadi Halfa, Khartoum, Juba and Entebbe. It utilised single-class 27-seat Vikings, which took three days (Note: with night stops) to complete the journey. Flown in conjunction with Airwork, soon achieved 90%+ load factors, such that a second weekly service was added from February 1953. The popularity of this venture prompted Hunting to open a second Colonial Coach Service between London and Salisbury (Rhodesia) from June 1953, and in association with Airwork and Central African Airways. Meanwhile, a month earlier, on May 15, a DC 3 had opened Hunting’s first internal scheduled service between Newcastle and London-Bovingdon. Other routes were also awarded to Amsterdam and Düsseldorf, begun late in 1953, while Oslo, Stockholm, Hamburg and Copenhagen, came during April 1954.

==== Two powerful groups join ====
A major organisational change came about in October 1953, with the purchase of an interest by the powerful Clan Line shipping company. It was the result of an agreement between the Hunting Group and the Clan Line group of companies to invest £500,000 each in a new company named Hunting-Clan Air Holdings Ltd., the holding company for the combined group's air transport businesses. The airline now became part of a holding company that embodied all Hunting’s diverse interests and was accordingly renamed, Hunting-Clan Air Transport Ltd. Apart from the air carrier itself, this included Field Aircraft Services Ltd, the Hunting group's aircraft maintenance arm.

Throughout 1954, internal scheduled services were consolidated, with Glasgow and Manchester being added as feeder services to the London route via Newcastle, alongside which a Glasgow-Newcastle-Paris route was also opened. Most of these services were flown by DC 3s, which now numbered seven in the fleet.

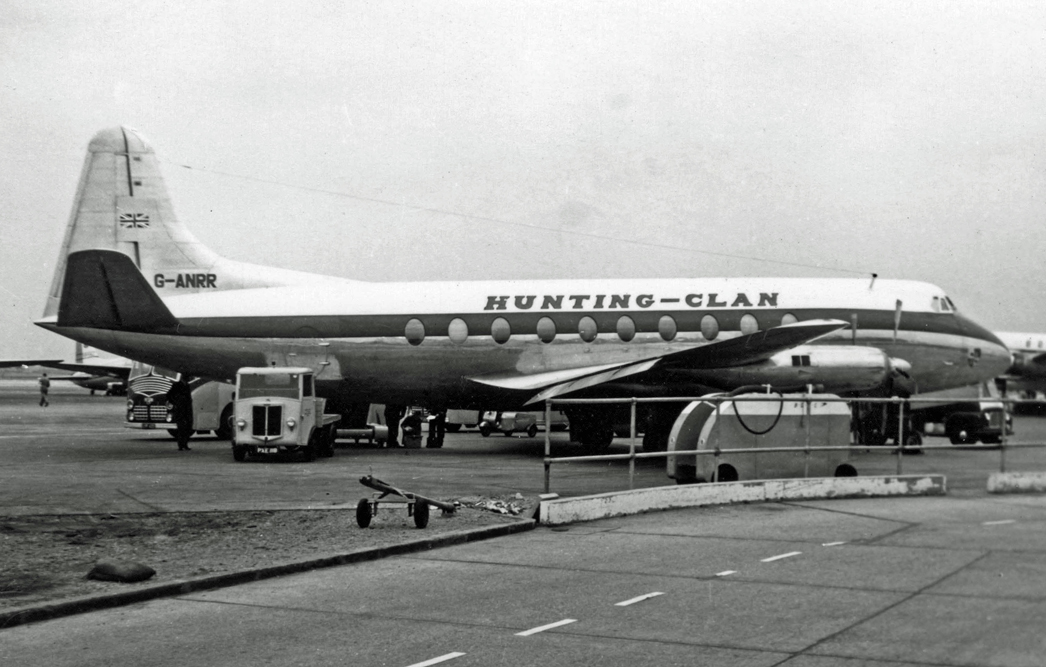
Hunting-Clan Vickers Viscount 732 at London Heathrow Airport North in 1955 soon after delivery

Further increasing its presence in Africa, a third coach-class route, operated on a monthly basis, was opened in May 1954, calling at Tangiers and Dakar, and down the west coast to Bathurst (Banjul), Freetown and Accra. Similarly, this network was further extended by another monthly service to Gibraltar via Biarritz from February 1955. Hunting-Clan's operations now included all-economy Safari/Colonial Coach class (Note: British residents only) services to East, Central, Southern and West Africa, general passenger and cargo charter and inclusive tour (IT) flights. Regular live- and bloodstock flights were another Hunting-Clan speciality. The airline also gained scheduled licences to operate a Northern network centred on Newcastle upon Tyne, linking Newcastle with Bovingdon, Manchester and Glasgow in the UK, as well as with Paris, Amsterdam, Hamburg, Copenhagen, Stockholm and Oslo in Europe; all routes were to be served with Dakotas at a frequency of two flights per week, except Newcastle-Bovingdon which was to be served twice daily (with services to Glasgow and Manchester eventually flown daily during the peak summer season).

In October 1954, the London hub, hitherto Northolt, was changed to Heathrow, while Bovingdon was retained as an engineering base. With apparent foresight, Hunting Clan had ordered Vickers Viscount turboprop aircraft in May 1953 and, in an attempt to boost passenger numbers. In mid-1955, Hunting-Clan became the first British independent airline to operate these state-of-the-art aircraft, when it took delivery of three brand-new series 730. These replaced Vikings on Safari/Colonial Coach and trooping flights to Africa, as well as on some of the airline's passenger charter and IT flights. The first of these was introduced to scheduled service on Scandinavian routes from June 1955. This attempt was largely unsuccessful and the turboprops were leased out. Problems with the Newcastle-based scheduled network were apparently solved in November, by handing it over entirely to Dragon Airways. To consolidate this move, in the same month Dragon Airways became (until 1957) a wholly owned subsidiary.

==== More important developments in Africa ====
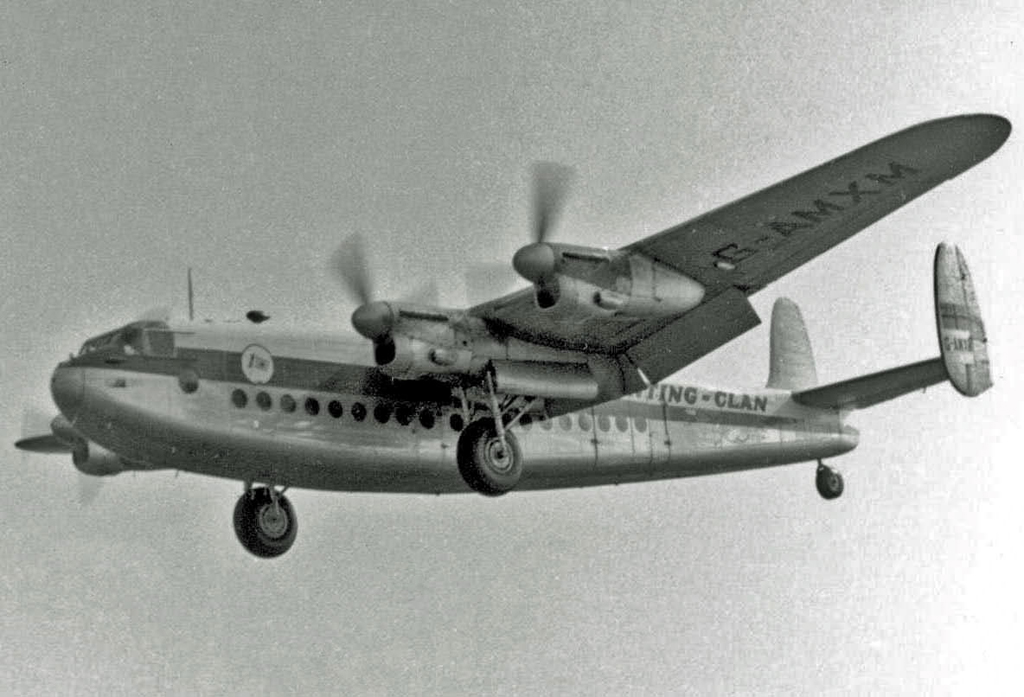
Avro York Africargo service, 1955

For some time Hunting-Clan had set its sights on opening an all-cargo service to Africa and had amassed a small fleet of Avro 685 Yorks for conversion with the eventual granting of complex en-route traffic rights. By mid-1955 all was ready to begin operations. A Salisbury (Rhodesia)-based subsidiary, Hunting-Clan African Airways Ltd. was created, together with two "paper" companies, Clanair and Northern Air Transport, used primarily for aircraft registration purposes. Thus prepared, Africargo was launched on 23 July, with an Avro York originating at Manchester and flying via London-Heathrow to East Africa. (Note: Britain's first scheduled all-cargo service to Africa inaugurated on 23 July 1955) To offset the denial of onward traffic rights to Johannesburg, a connecting route was instead opened between Salisbury and Nairobi via Lusaka, N’dola and Blantyre. Hunting-Clan did eventually operate through to Johannesburg in 1958, though with a tourist passenger service from Salisbury, flown with DC 3s. By 1957 cargo traffic in Africa had more than trebled in capacity available. However, the Yorks were becoming increasingly unsuitable to sustain this operation, because of the low speed, poor service ceiling and inability to circumnavigate the often violent and changeable weather over the African continent. So, in August 1958, Hunting-Clan took delivery of two pressurised Douglas DC-6 freighters and these completely replaced the ageing Yorks early in 1959.

Hunting-Clan placed the Viscounts on the Colonial Coach services and such was their popularity that two of the larger 800-series aircraft were ordered for delivery in mid-1959. By this time an increasing feature of the airline’s business was the developing inclusive-tour market and from May 1959, such services were flown from Manchester to Mediterranean resorts, using DC-6s when not required for cargo operations. These flights were taken over by the new Viscounts from July and occasionally augmented with Vikings, which were otherwise mainly employed on ad-hoc charters before their eventual disposal by early 1960.

==== More maneuvers at the top ====
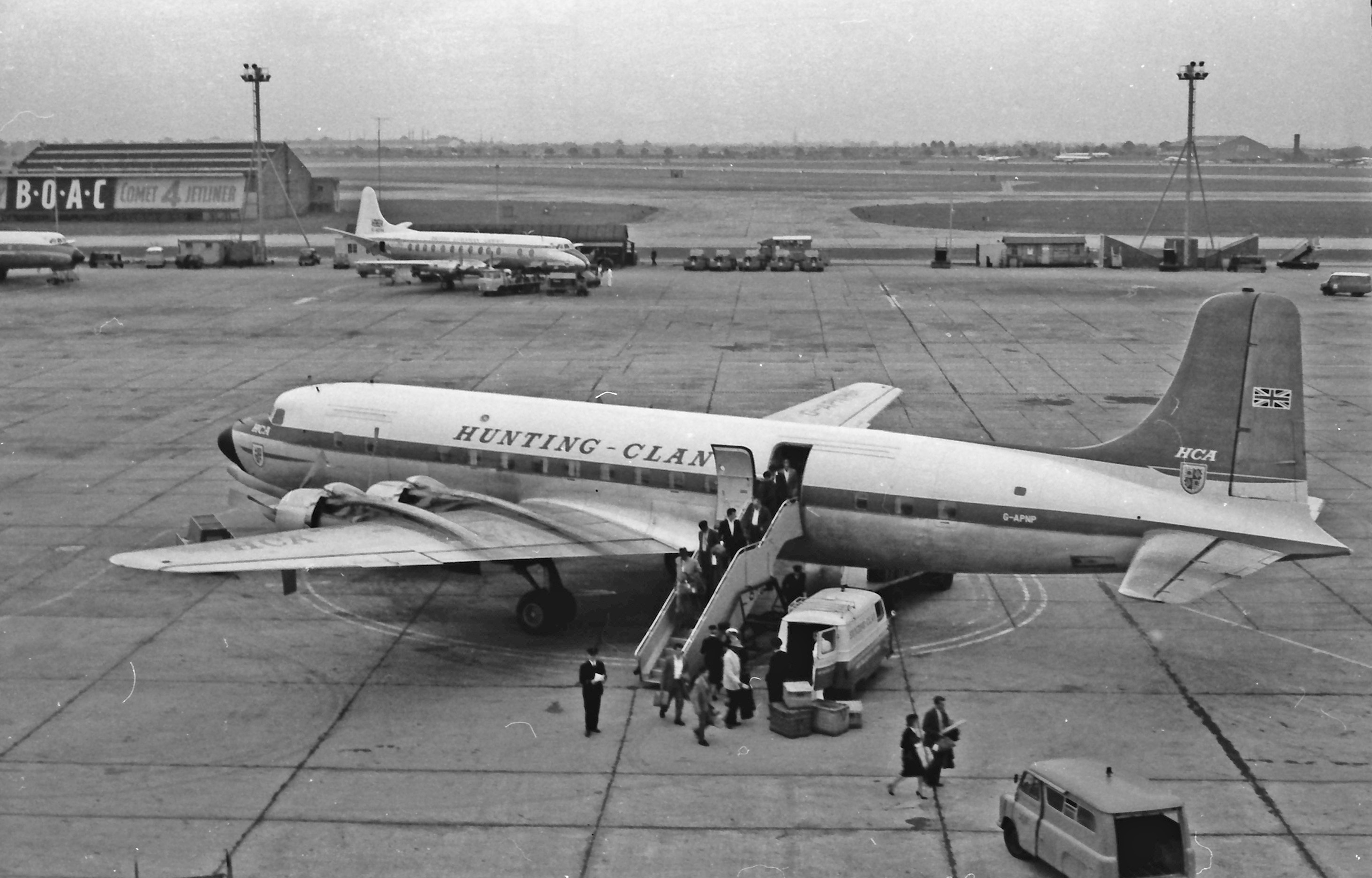
Douglas DC6

In 1956, two shipping lines - Clan Line and the Union-Castle Line - joined with the King Line and Bullard King & Co. to form British & Commonwealth Shipping. Hunting-Clan, which already had two Bristol B-175 Britannias on order, won a trooping contract against competition from Air Charter and Airwork.

By 1957, Hunting-Clan and Airwork converted their successful East, West and Southern African Safari/Colonial Coach flights into regular "third-class" scheduled services. However, the Government forced the independents to maintain additional stops that were no longer needed, as a result of replacing Vikings with more advanced Douglas DC-6s and Vickers Viscounts. When Britain's African colonies became independent, Safari/Colonial Coach was converted into a fully fledged scheduled service. To secure their traffic rights between the UK and the newly independent African nations, Hunting-Clan and Airwork began participating in revenue-sharing agreements with BOAC and the destination countries' flag carriers. (Note: following Hunting-Clan's's absorption into BUA and that airline's subsequent acquisition by Caledonian Airways to form British Caledonian (BCal), these arrangements continued to be the legal basis of BUA's and BCal's UK—Africa scheduled services) 1957 was also the year Hunting-Clan discontinued its Northern network, resulting in the closure of the base at Newcastle Airport. This move resulted in concentrating all of Hunting's UK-based activities at London Airport (Heathrow).

==== Big independents merger ====
Towards the end of 1958, two Bristol B-175 Britannias had also been delivered. They wore the livery of British & Commonwealth Shipping, the group new name after Clan Line had merged with the Union-Castle Mail Steamship Company in January 1956. It had been envisaged that the Britannias would be used on a new passenger service into central Africa, but this idea was later dropped and instead they found better use on new long-haul trooping contracts to overseas destinations. Hunting-Clan reported substantial losses in 1958. The airline was also facing unexpected problems meeting the War Office's contractual requirements. At that time, trooping accounted for the biggest share of Hunting's overall business. In 1958-1958 three Viscount series 800 were delivered and almost immediately employed in Safari service, but their career with Hunting was short.

The company's poor financial performance accelerated the initiation of exploratory talks with the Airwork group about a potential alliance, including a full-scale merger of their air transport businesses. Moreover there were increasing signs that the government of the day was becoming more sympathetic to the independents’ calls for relaxation of the state monopoly over scheduled services. By March 1960, Hunting-Clan's and Airwork's shareholders had finalised the merger terms. This was followed by a public announcement of their airline subsidiaries' intention to amalgamate all commercial activities from June 1960, British United Airways, which became a reality on July 1, 1960.

The Hunting Group maintained its other aviation-related activities for another 40 years or so, through Hunting Aircraft and Engineering, Field’s and latterly, Hunting Cargo.

== Fleet ==
In the years Hunting Air Travel, Hunting Air Transport, and Hunting-Clan Air Transport operated the following aircraft types:

- 4 x Avro Nineteen
- 6 x Avro 685 York 2 never operated
- 3 x Bristol Britannia 317 1 leased
- 3 x de Havilland DH 89 Dragon Rapide
- 2 x DH.104 de Havilland Dove
- 8 x Douglas DC-3
- 2 x Douglas DC-6A
- 4 x P.44 Percival Proctor V
- 13 x V.600 Vickers Viking 1/1A/1B 1 for spares only, 1 leased
- 5 x Vickers Viscount 700 2 never entered service as re-sold before delivery
- 3 x Vickers Viscount 800

=== Fleet in 1958 ===
In April 1958, the fleet comprised 15 aircraft.

| Aircraft type | Number in fleet |
|---|---|
| Vickers Viscount 700 | 3 |
| Vickers Viking | 9 |
| Avro 685 York | 3 |
| Total | 15 |

== Subsidiaries ==
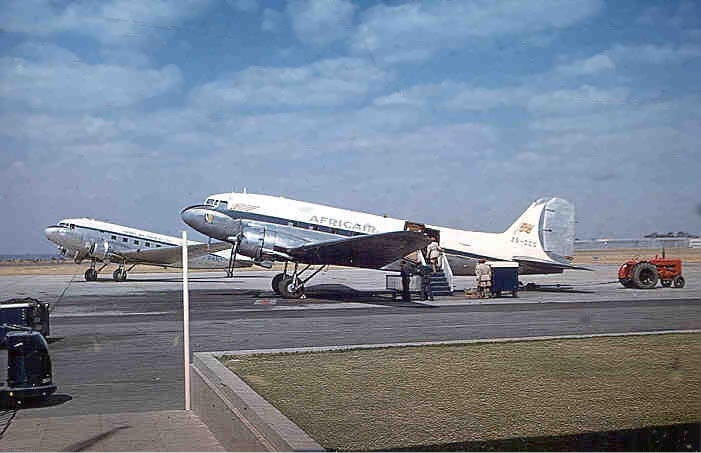
Douglas DC 3 leased to Hunting-Clan African Airways

- Dragon Airways Ltd. was a Hunting A.T. subsidiary from November 1955 until February 1957. It operated DH.89 de Havilland Dragon Rapide, DH.114 de Havilland Heron. In early 1957 it was merged into Silver City Airways-Northern Division.
- Hunting-Clan African Airways (Pvt.) Ltd. was formed in February 1955 as a 100% subsidiary. Scheduled operations were started on 23 July and were always jointly run together with the parent company. Douglas DC-3 (some of them leased) and DH.89 de Havilland Dragon Rapides were used for all services from Salisbury to Kariba, Lusaka and Nairobi as well as IT flights to Kariba and Mozambique.. Schedules were stopped on 31 December, 1959 and the airline merged to form Hunting-Clan Air Carriers.

== Accidents and incidents ==
There are some recorded accidents involving Hunting aircraft. Two of these were fatal.

1. 17 May 1947 - Hunting Air Travel Percival P.44 Proctor 5 crashed near Haven (Belgium). No fatalities.
2. 8 May 1951 - A non-fatal incident involved a Hunting Air Travel Vickers 639 Viking 1 operating an international scheduled passenger flight from Bordeaux Mérignac to RAF Bovingdon. Following an uneventful takeoff, the no. 1 engine suddenly began to lose power when the aircraft climbed through 163 ft (50 m) and the pilot in command throttled down to initial climbing speed. The pilot then shut down the malfunctioning engine, feathered the propeller and applied full power to the no. 2 engine to compensate for the loss of engine no. 1. However, this was insufficient to maintain altitude and led to the flightdeck crew's decision to execute a gear-up landing. When the aircraft touched the ground, it slid for about 110 yd (100 m) before coming to a halt. There were no fatalities among the 32 occupants (5 crew and 27 passengers). Accident investigators established the probable cause as the disconnecting of the articulated control rod of the propeller governor due to the lack of a split pin on the governor spindle, and due to the nut of the ball joint of the control spindle having been unscrewed by force.
3. 16 February 1952 - First fatal accident which involved a Hunting Air Travel Vickers 614 Viking 1 operating an international non-scheduled passenger flight between Nice Côte d'Azur Airport and Malta Luqa Airport. The aircraft was destroyed and all 31 occupants (5 crew and 26 passengers) were killed when it crashed into the northern slope of the La Cinta mountain range (Sardinia-Italy) at an altitude of 3,410 ft (1,040 m). This was the worst fatal accident in the company's history. The commission investigating the accident established "imprudence on the part of the pilot", who did not maintain a sufficient safety altitude during his flight, as the prime cause. This was of particular importance in view of the thundery formations that were present over the area. The pilot's ignorance of existing wind conditions the aircraft encountered en route, which led to a three-degree discrepancy between the actual and intended track, was cited as a contributory factor. The investigating commission furthermore found that D/F stations at Rome and Cagliari provided flight safeguarding services as and when required, and that other D/F stations at Milan and Venice voluntarily transmitted bearing information to ensure the aircraft and its occupants reached their destination safely.
4. 18 February 1956 - Hunting-Clan Air Transport Douglas DC 3 off Arabian coastline. No further details.
5. 2 December 1958 - The second airline fatal accident involved a Hunting-Clan Air Transport Vickers Viscount 732 on a test flight following a major overhaul. While flying at 1,000 ft (300 m) 10 minutes after takeoff from London Airport (Heathrow), the aircraft lost its starboard wing. This caused the aircraft to crash and catch fire, killing all six occupants. Accident investigators established the reverse operation of the elevator spring tab as the probable cause. Incorrect maintenance of the spring tab mechanism and failure to notice the tab's faulty operation as a result of negligence on the part of maintenance personnel, who were responsible for inspecting the aircraft before returning it to service, involved the pilot in command in involuntary manoeuvres that overstressed the aircraft. This in turn resulted in the aircraft's right wing breaking off.

== See also ==
- List of defunct airlines of the United Kingdom

== Notes ==
Notes

Citations
