= 1959 Air Charter Turkey crash =

1959 aviation accident

G-AGRH Zephyr
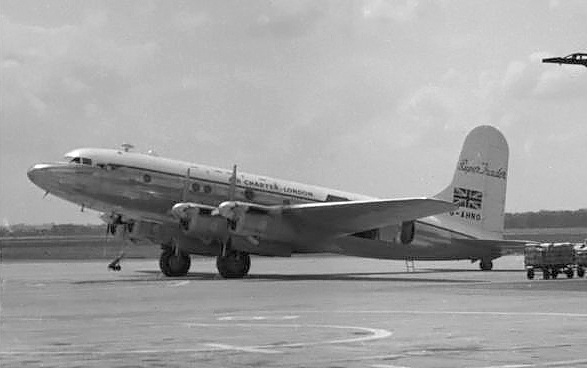
- An Avro Super Trader IV very similar to the accident aircraft

Accident
- Date: 23 April 1959
- Summary: Controlled flight into terrain (mountains)
- Site: Mount Süphan, Turkey; 38.92°N 42.82°E

Aircraft
- Aircraft type: Avro Super Trader IV
- Operator: Air Charter
- Registration: G-AGRH
- Flight origin: United Kingdom
- Stopover: Ankara
- 2nd stopover: Bahrain International Airport
- Destination: Woomera Airfield, Australia
- Passengers: 0
- Crew: 12
- Fatalities: 12
- Survivors: 0

G-AGRH Zephyr was an Avro Super Trader IV cargo aircraft which crashed on Mount Süphan in eastern Turkey on 23 April 1959. The Super Trader IV was a modified Avro Tudor IV, which had been fitted with an aft cargo door and was flown unpressurized.

== Crash ==
G-AGRH, owned by Air Charter Limited, departed Ankara for a flight to Bahrain, which was a leg of a long cargo flight from the United Kingdom to Woomera Airfield in Australia. The aircraft was carrying twelve men and top-secret equipment for Woomera rocket range. Between Ankara and Teheran it used an air corridor which would take it over the middle of Lake Van, Turkey's largest lake, almost surrounded by mountains and situated close to the Soviet-Armenian border.

At 08:14, the aircraft passed over Gemerek at FL115 and at 08:59 it passed over Elazığ at FL135. The last position report was received at 09:26 over Muş. The aircraft had crashed, and was found six days later on Mount Süphan, a little north of Lake Van.

A special Royal Air Force mountain rescue team of six men from Nicosia, Cyprus reached the crash site at the top of the mountain some days later and demolished the plane wreckage with explosives after retrieving several important documents.

There was unproven speculation that there were nuclear warheads in the cargo. An anonymous source alleged that, some years later, some local villagers who went to the wreck were diagnosed with cancer and died due to high exposure to the radioactive substances.The Ağrı, Lake Van and Bitlis has a radiation.

== Investigation ==
The official investigation into the accident concluded that the aircraft, which had been flying on instruments, drifted north of its normal track because of strong winds and crashed into the mountain. Stronger-than-forecast winds may have been a contributing factor – an accurate bearing could not be obtained at Muş, and the wind forecast at Van had not been checked. In addition to this, sub-normal temperatures would have resulted in a high indicated altimeter reading and calculations on the flight and contacts with beacons were not coordinated and controlled.
