= Llysworney =

Coordinates: 51.4566°N 3.4951°W

Llysworney: Welsh: Llyswyrni
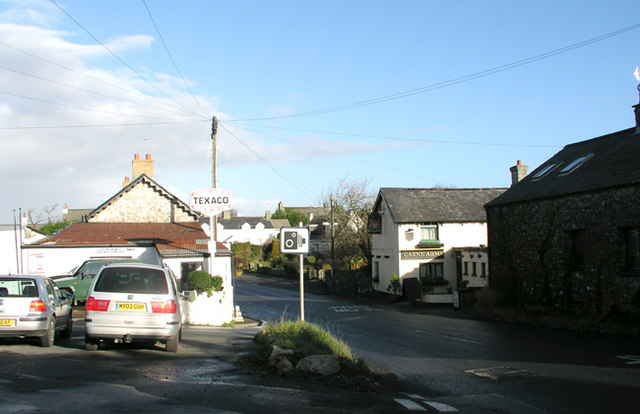
- Llysworney village centre

- Location within the Vale of Glamorgan
- OS grid reference: SS962741
- Principal area: Vale of Glamorgan
- Preserved county: South Glamorgan
- Country: Wales
- Sovereign state: United Kingdom
- Postcode district: CF
- Police: South Wales
- Fire: South Wales
- Ambulance: Welsh
- UK Parliament: Vale of Glamorgan
- Senedd Cymru – Welsh Parliament: Vale of Glamorgan

Llysworney (Welsh: Llyswyrni) is a small village in the Vale of Glamorgan, South Wales, in the community of Llandow.

Llysworney is home to about 240 people and has around 100 houses. It is situated about 2 miles away from Cowbridge in the Vale of Glamorgan. It is in the historic county of Glamorgan. The B4268 runs through the village. The village includes the Carne Arms pub, St. Tydfil's Church, a duck pond, and Llysworney Garage.

== Notable landmarks ==
=== The Carne Arms ===
Dating back over 400 years the Carne Arms is an old inn with open fires. Thought to have originally been part of the local Rectory, it is named after the Carne family, who were wealthy landowners in the local area.

=== St. Tydfil's Church ===
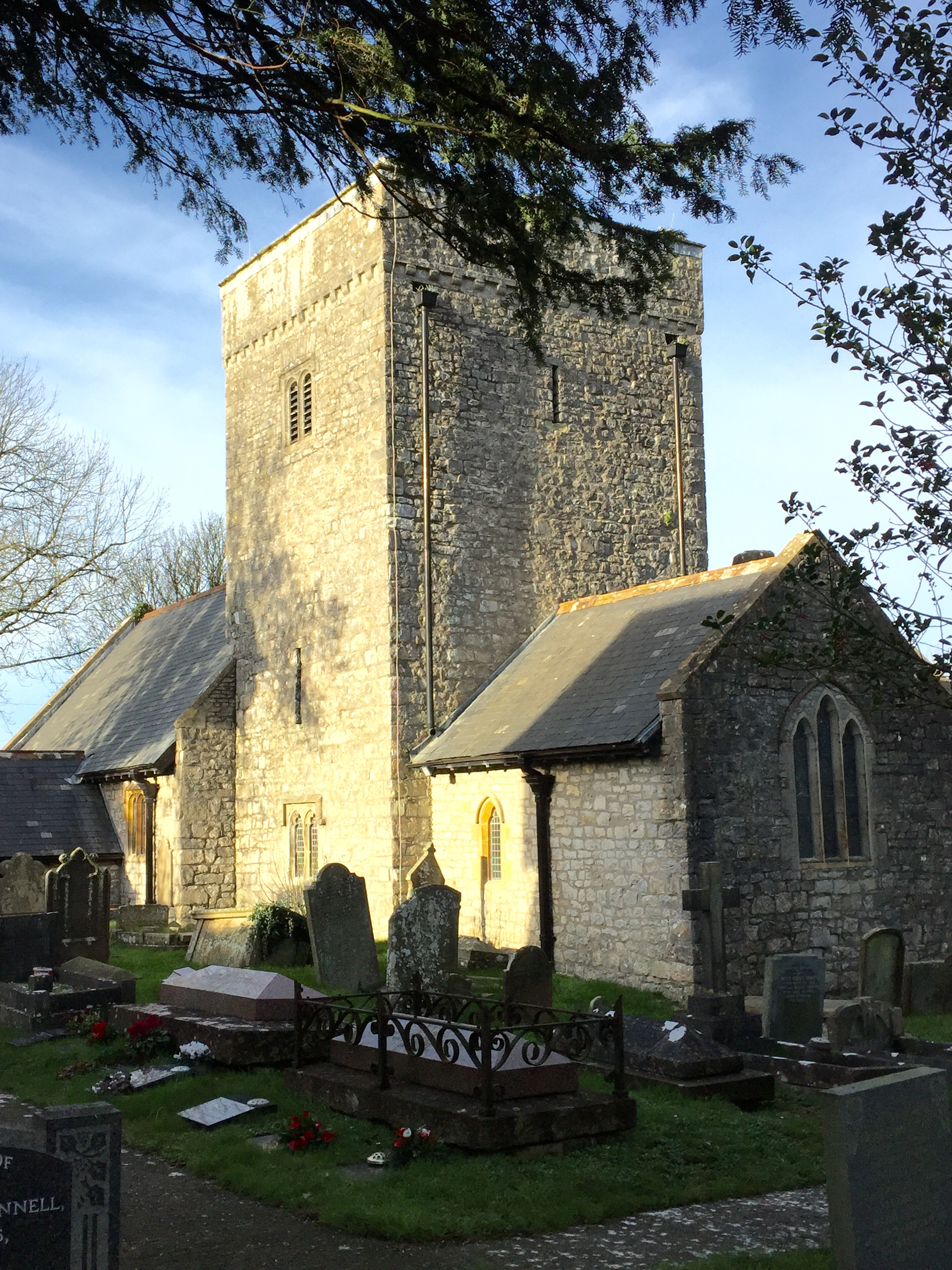
St Tydfil's Church

St. Tydfil's Church is dedicated to the fifth century saint Tydfil. The church is medieval.

=== Worney Wood ===
The wood was established in 2000 and is managed by the Woodland Trust. It is open to the public.

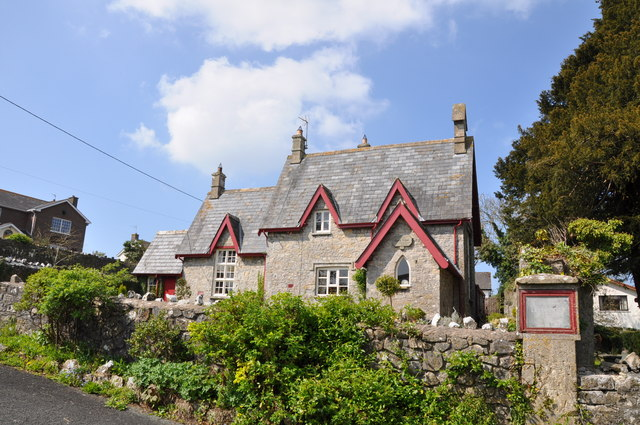
The old Church School

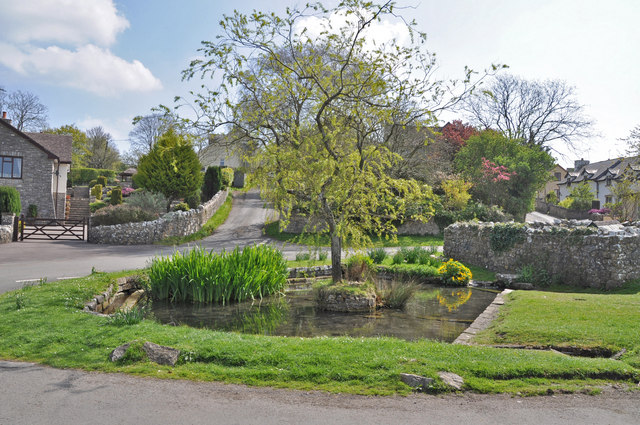
Village pond

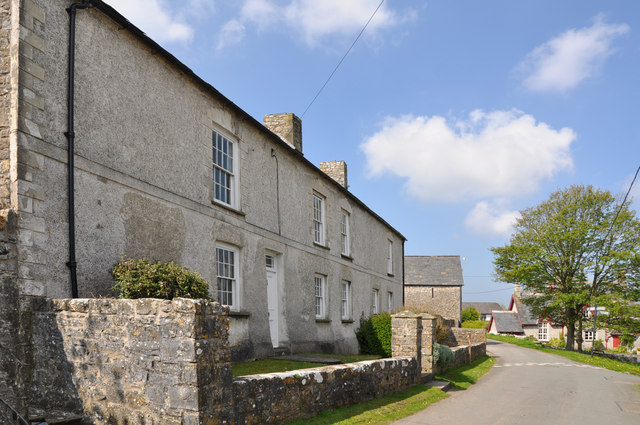
Great House in Church Street

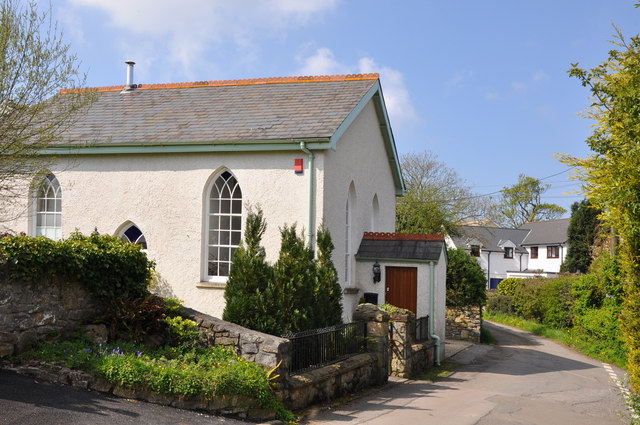
Former Ebenezer Particular Baptist Chapel
