= Air Charter Limited =

1947–1960 United Kingdom airline

Air Charter
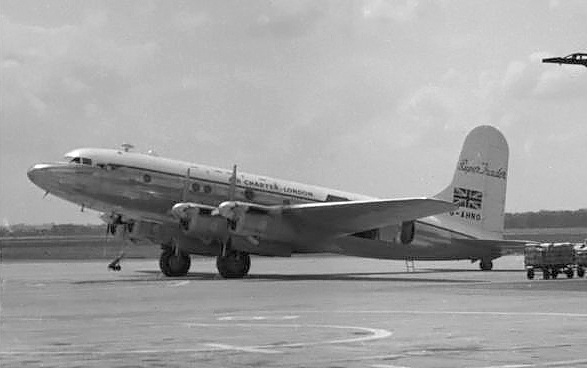
- Founded: 1947
- Ceased operations: 1960 (member of Airwork group; merged with Hunting-Clan Air Transport to form British United; Airways)
- Hubs: Southend Airport; Stansted
- Fleet size: 18 aircraft (3 Douglas DC-4, 6 Bristol 170 Superfreighter Mark 32, 3 Bristol 170 Freighter Mark 31, 6 Avro 685 York) [as of April 1958]
- Destinations: worldwide
- Parent company: Airwork (1958–1960)
- Headquarters: Central London
- Key people: F.A. Laker, E.N. Jennings, G.W. Forster, D.A. Whybrow

Air Charter was an early post-World War II private, British independent (Note: independent from government-owned corporations) airline formed in 1947. The airline conducted regular trooping flights to Cyprus as well as worldwide passenger and freight charter flights from its bases at Southend Airport and Stansted. Following Freddie Laker's acquisition of Air Charter in 1951, Aviation Traders and Aviation Traders (Engineering) became associated companies. From 1955, it also operated scheduled coach-air/vehicle ferry services. These initially linked London and Paris (via Southend and Calais). In 1958, the process of transferring Air Charter's coach-air/vehicle ferry operation to sister company Channel Air Bridge began. In 1959, Air Charter became part of the Airwork group. In 1960, Airwork joined with Hunting-Clan to form British United Airways (BUA).

== History ==
Following its formation in early 1947, Air Charter Ltd. started operations from London's old Croydon Airport with two Dragon Rapides. In early 1948, these were joined by an Airspeed Consul to operate light passenger and freight charters. Operations with these twin-engined aircraft continued until February 1951.

Freddie Laker followed up his acquisition of bankrupt Surrey Flying Services in February 1951 with the purchase of loss-making Air Charter later the same year. In July, 1952 he bought Don Bennett's Fairflight, another struggling independent airline. Laker's main motivation to take over these airlines was his eligibility to use those companies' tax losses to offset Aviation Traders' profits as a convenient way to reduce his taxable earnings. The Fairflight acquisition enabled Laker to take over that company's lucrative Government contract to transport refugees, goods and raw materials between West Berlin and West Germany as part of the second "Little Berlin Airlift". Within a year of assuming that contract, Laker ran 70 flights a week linking Berlin with Hamburg and Hanover.

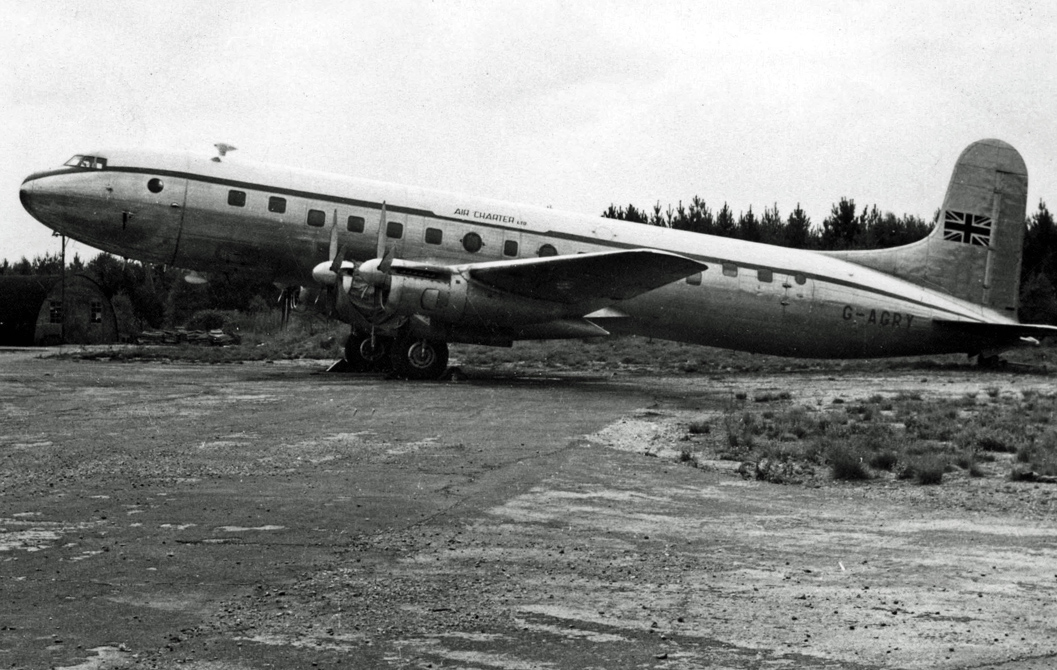
This stretched Avro 689 Tudor 2 served Air Charter during the mid-1950s

From July 1952, Air Charter assumed sole responsibility for all of Laker's flying operations to and from Berlin. This move coincided with the adoption of a new logo for the airline, consisting of an "A" and a "C" curving together with a wing flaring out behind.

Air Charter gradually became the dominant UK independent airline on the second "Little Berlin Airlift". Air Charter's expanded Berlin operation in turn allowed it to service and organise the operations of rival airlines.

During that time, Air Charter acquired several Avro York and Avro Tudor aircraft as freighters, mainly for use on freight charter contracts awarded by the War Office. Laker purchased 17 of the latter between 1953 and 1959. Eleven of these were restored to an airworthy condition, supported by the spares cannibalised from the remaining six aircraft. By the end of that period, they accumulated 46,000 profitable flight hours while in service with Air Charter. During that time, Air Charter's Tudor fleet produced a cash flow of £1m a year between 1954 and 1958.

The February 1953 crash of a Skyways Avro York trooping charter over the Atlantic with the loss of all 39 lives on board (Note: including those of women and children) presented an opportunity for Laker to break into the lucrative trooping market that was dominated by Airwork, Eagle, Hunting and Skyways. Prior to the Skyways crash, the War Office always favoured the lowest bid although the award of trooping contracts had been dependent upon inspection of the aircraft the bidder proposed to use. As a result of that crash, the Government's attitude towards safety standards of the independent airlines that were to be contracted for its trooping business changed. Until then, all trooping flights were conducted with ex-wartime aircraft and early post-war designs derived from wartime bombers such as the Avro York and Handley Page Hermes. The flights were uncomfortable and prone to long delays due to the aircraft's poor reliability.

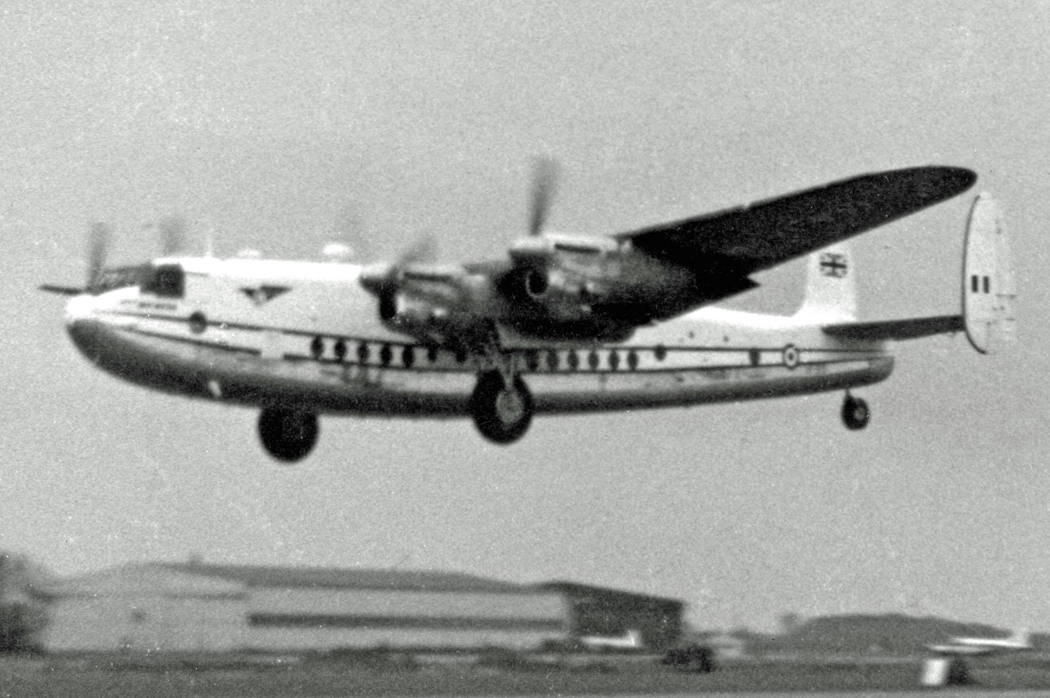
Air Charter Avro York taking off from Stansted during 1955 on a trooping flight through the Suez Canal Zone

Unlike Laker's established rivals in the trooping business, the Yorks Air Charter proposed to use on trooping flights offered unprecedented safety standards and a hitherto unknown level of comfort, including rear-facing seats with headrests. These were industry-firsts in the trooping business. In addition, Air Charter proposed to place spare parts along the routes to be flown – another industry-first. These innovations secured Air Charter its first trooping contract. For Laker, Air Charter's owner, the new contract was a goldmine. The £90 per flying hour the War Office was contracted to pay Air Charter made flying troops in cheap, second-hand planes a very profitable business, given the fact that Laker could easily amortise the cost of each York for about £5,000 as a result of the massive spares stockpile he had purchased at rock-bottom prices in government surplus sales on behalf of Aviation Traders.

The fatal Skyways crash in February coincided with Laker's acquisition of his first brand-new aircraft, a Bristol 170 Freighter. The aircraft was nicknamed the "Gold Brick". It went into service on Air Charter's Berlin freight run. Air Charter acquired its second Bristol Freighter a year later for use on trooping flights. Another seven were added over the following three years. However, most of these were transferred to Channel Air Bridge, a sister airline of Air Charter Laker started on an experimental basis in 1954.

While building up its fleet to meet growing commitments in the trooping as well as general passenger and freight charter markets, Air Charter was often under financial pressure.

1953 was also the year Air Charter became really profitable. During that year, the airline carried nearly 28 million pounds of cargo and almost 10,000 passengers, while its planes flew 750,000 revenue miles. In terms of cargo carried, Air Charter was second only to Silver City Airways among the UK's contemporary independent airlines. Laker used part of Air Charter's retained profit to purchase additional Tudor aircraft.

On 14 February 1954, Air Charter put its first improved Tudor 4 into service between Stansted and Hamburg on the second "Little Berlin Airlift". The second example joined Air Charter's fleet the following month. Both aircraft were configured with 42 seats. Apart from carrying refugees out of Berlin under contract to British European Airways, they were used on a West African colonial coach-class passenger service (Note: British residents only) between Stansted, Idris and Lagos as well as on trooping flights. As a result of the Army's refusal to allow its troops to be flown in Tudors following two unexplained British South American Airways crashes over the Atlantic during the late 1940s, the War Office insisted that this aircraft type be no longer used on trooping flights. This forced Air Charter to convert its revamped Tudors into freighters. The Tudor's great disadvantage as a cargo carrier was its small passenger doors. The problem was solved by replacing the passenger doors with double doors that opened outwards to give an opening 6 feet 10 inches wide and 5 ft 5 in high. This modification entailed strengthening of the fuselage around the cut-out and stiffening of the floor. It was implemented at Aviation Traders. Following Air Registration Board approval, the modified Tudor freighters re-entered service as Supertraders.

In February 1955, Air Charter imported its first Douglas DC-4 into the United Kingdom. This aircraft was a C-54B Skymaster, the DC-4's US military version. Laker had acquired the aircraft second-hand from World Airways, a US supplemental air carrier. The aircraft was intended for use on internal German services, general charter work and trooping flights.

In April 1955, Air Charter inaugurated its first vehicle ferry service between Southend and Calais using Bristol Superfreighter Mark 32s. The service, which Air Charter operated on behalf of Channel Air Bridge, was successful. In June 1957, a joint service with Sabena began between Southend and Ostend, which operated six times a day each way using three dedicated Superfreighters in full Sabena livery. The airline also operated vehicle ferry services between Southend and Rotterdam.

In September 1956, an Air Charter Supertrader performed the airline's first round-the-world flight via Christmas Island.

1956 was also the year the War Office invited new tenders for trooping flight contracts to Europe and the Far East, as a consequence of the Government's growing dissatisfaction with the operational performance and high costs of the aging Hermes fleet that was contracted from Airwork, Britavia and Skyways to operate most of these flights. The War Office specified exclusive use of state-of-the-art Bristol Britannia turboprops on the Far Eastern route as it had calculated that this would save the Government £1.75m each year compared with continuing use of the Hermes. The War Office offered the successful bidder the option of purchasing three new Britannias from the Government as part of a five-year contract or the alternative to lease these planes under a three-year contract. The contracts were to become effective from 1958. Hunting-Clan won against competition from Air Charter and Airwork.

During that time, the cash flow Air Charter and Aviation Traders generated also financed the design and construction of the prototype of the ill-fated Accountant, which was completed early in 1957.

The end of the second "Little Berlin Airlift" in 1957 resulted in Air Charter redeploying Supertraders used on that run to carry "Black Knight" and "Blue Streak" rockets to the Woomera rocket-testing range in Australia under contract to the UK government. Air Charter's Supertraders were among the few older aircraft big enough to carry such bulky loads.

In 1958, Laker ordered two new Bristol Britannia turboprops direct from Bristol Aircraft on behalf of Air Charter. These were to replace the airline's aging Tudors on long-distance charter flights to Australia under contract to the Government. Air Charter took delivery of its first Britannia on 12 September 1958. This occasion marked the second time a brand-new aircraft joined its fleet. Revenue-earning flights began on 1 October 1958. On that day an Air Charter Britannia operated a trooping flight from Stansted to Christmas Island in the western Pacific with 124 passengers on board. Air Charter's Britannias subsequently launched non-stop Stansted—Entebbe flights as well, thereby proving British Overseas Airways Corporation's assertion that this was beyond the Britannia's range wrong. Hunting-Clan's successful bid to take over the UK—Singapore trooping contract from Airwork had been priced too low to leave any room for the depreciation of that airline's two new Britannias. Hunting was also facing unexpected problems meeting the War Office's contractual requirements. This necessitated subcontracting a significant part of its newly won business to Air Charter at a loss. Although this arrangement made Air Charter Hunting-Clan's subcontractor, Laker managed to persuade Hunting-Clan to agree to a new deal regarding the sharing of business. This effectively transferred the management of these flights to Air Charter.

In August 1958, another Air Charter Supertrader embarked on a memorable long-distance journey, when it flew to Christchurch in New Zealand to collect spares for a Bristol Freighter.

1958 was also the year Laker decided to put Air Charter's sister airline Channel Air Bridge solely in charge of all vehicle ferry services. (Note: including those previously operated by Air Charter) During that year, Laker furthermore announced his decision to sell both Air Charter and Aviation Traders to Airwork for £600,000 cash plus a further £200,000. (Note: subject to the valuation of stock) The deal became effective in January 1959, when Air Charter and Aviation Traders joined the Airwork group.

Following a rationalisation of Air Charter's flight crew and ground staff in February 1959, Laker implemented his decision to transfer Air Charter's vehicle ferry services and Bristol 170 fleet to Channel Air Bridge.

In July 1959, Air Charter retired its last two Supertraders due to wing spar fatigue. These were the last flying operations of the type, which had been employed on charter runs as far afield as Christmas Island during its career with Air Charter.

Air Charter's operations were absorbed into the newly formed BUA, as a result of the Airwork – Hunting-Clan merger in June 1960.

== Fleet ==
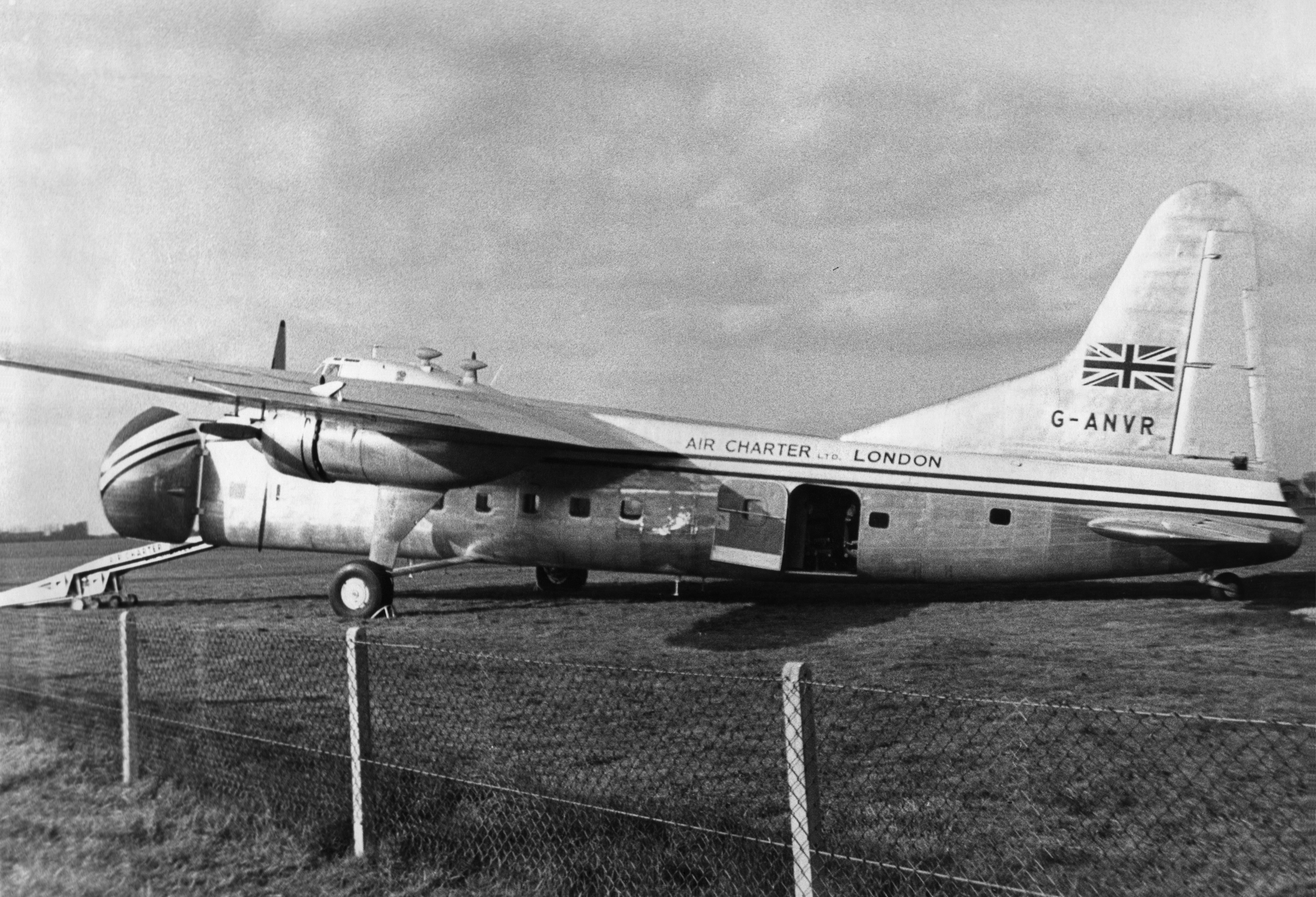
Bristol Freighter Mark 32 at Southend airport in May 1955

Air Charter fleet consisted of the following aircraft types:

- 1 x AS.65 Airspeed Consul 1948-1950
- 10 x Avro York 1951-1956
- 8 x Avro Tudor 1951-1959
- 9 x B-170 Bristol Freighter/Superfreighter 1953-1959
- 2 x B-175 Bristol Britannia 1958-1960
- 1 x DH.84 de Havilland Dragon 1947-1951
- 2 x DH.89A de Havilland Dragon Rapide 1947-1950
- 4 x Douglas DC-4/C-54 1955-1960
- 3 x Miles M.65 Gemini 1A 1947-1957

=== Fleet in 1953 ===
In February 1953, the Air Charter fleet comprised 10 aircraft.

February 1953 fleet
Aircraft	Number
Avro 688 Tudor	1
Avro 685 York	7
Bristol 170 Freighter Mark 31E	1
Douglas DC-3	1
Total	10

=== Fleet in 1958 ===
In April 1958, the Air Charter fleet comprised 18 aircraft.

April 1958 fleet
Aircraft	Number
Douglas DC-4	3
Bristol 170 Superfreighter Mark 32	6
Bristol 170 Freighter Mark 31	3
Avro 685 York	6
Total	18

== Accidents and incidents ==
Accidents involving Air Charter aircraft include:

1. 11 March 1952: Avro 685 York registered G-AMGL crashed on ground while approaching Hamburg/Fuhlsbuttel airport
2. 27 January 1959: Avro Super Trader IV registered G-AGRG crashed in flames while taking off from at Brindisi Popola Casale airport because of strong crosswinds and poor runway conditions; both pilots killed
3. 23 April 1959: Avro Super Trader IV registered G-AGRH crashed in eastern Turkey with the loss of the 12 crew. Apparently deviated from track Until this accident, Air Charter had suffered another two total losses of aircraft, one of them fatal.

== See also ==
- Freddie Laker
- List of defunct airlines of the United Kingdom

== Notes ==
Notes

Citations

Bibliography

- Jackson, A.J. (1973). British Civil Aircraft since 1919 — Volume 1. Putnam & Company Ltd. ISBN 0-370-10006-9.
- Merton Jones, T. (1972). British Independent Airline & Operators Since 1947. UK: LAAS International. NONE.
- Merton-Jones, A.C. (1976). British Independent Airlines since 1946. Merseyside Aviation Society. ISBN 0-902420-07-0.
- Eglin, Roger; Ritchie, Berry (1980). Fly me, I'm Freddie. London, UK: Weidenfeld and Nicolson. ISBN 0-297-77746-7.
- Dean, W.P.; O'Callaghan, M. (2008). The ATL-98 Carvair: A Comprehensive History of the Aircraft and All 21 Airframes (1: Corporate History - Air Charter, p. 13). Jefferson, N.C., USA: McFarland & Co. ISBN 978-0-7864-3670-5.
- "Airliner Classics (Sir Freddie Laker – The Man Who Gave Us Skytrain, p. 81)". Stamford, Lincs, UK: Key Publishing. November 2009. Archived from the original on 6 January 2010.
- "Airliner Classics (SABENA – Belgium's Flag Carrier: Post-war years, p. 63)". Stamford, Lincs, UK: Key Publishing. July 2013. Archived from the original on 6 July 2013.
- Airliner World — Britain's Carferry Airlines, January 2004. Avenel, NJ, USA: Key Publishing. (Airliner World online)
