= Llandow =

Village in the Vale of Glamorgan, Wales

Llandow: Welsh: Llandw or Llandwy
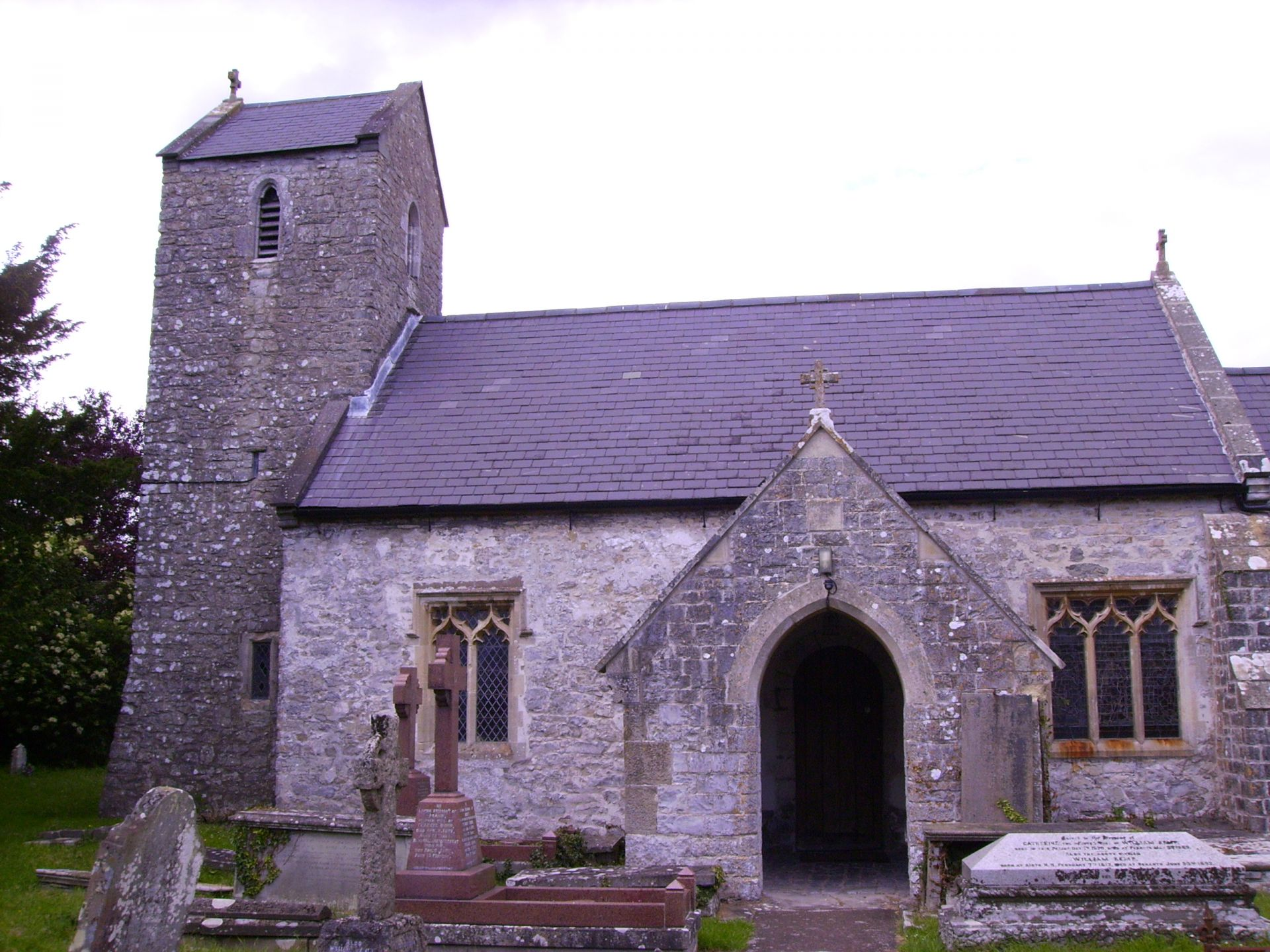
- Trinity Church, Llandow

- Location within the Vale of Glamorgan
- Population: 2,643 Llandaff/Ewenny Ward
- OS grid reference: SS942734
- Principal area: Vale of Glamorgan
- Preserved county: South Glamorgan
- Country: Wales
- Sovereign state: United Kingdom
- Post town: COWBRIDGE
- Postcode district: CF71
- Dialling code: 01446
- Police: South Wales
- Fire: South Wales
- Ambulance: Welsh
- UK Parliament: Vale of Glamorgan
- List of places UK Wales Vale of Glamorgan 51.449°N 3.523°W Map of the community

Llandow (Welsh: Llandŵ) is a village and community in the Vale of Glamorgan, Wales. The community population taken at the 2011 census was 726. The village is located 15 miles (24 km) south west of Cardiff. The community includes the villages of Sigingstone and Llysworney.

== Governance ==
Llandow has a community council which elects a total of ten community councillors from the wards of Llandow, Llysworney and Llanmihangel.

Prior to 1995 Llandow was an electoral ward to the Vale of Glamorgan Borough Council. There were no contests in the ward, with a Conservative councillor being elected unopposed at each borough election. With the transfer of Ewenny to the Vale in 1996, Llandow became part of the county ward of Llandow/Ewenny for elections to the Vale of Glamorgan Council. From the 2022 Vale of Glamorgan Council elections Ewenny was transferred to the neighbouring St Brides Major ward. Llandow/Ewenny became simply Llandow.

== Amenities ==
Within Llandow is a small parish church of 11th-century origins dedicated to the Holy Trinity, with a saddleback tower.

Adjacent to the village is a disused airfield that was once home to a World War II RAF station, part of which has now been converted into the Llandow Circuit for motorsports. Next to this is the South Wales Karting Centre, home to the Llandow Kart Club.

== Llandow air disaster 1950 ==
On 12 March 1950 RAF Llandow was the site of the Llandow air disaster, when an airliner returning Welsh rugby fans from an international match in Belfast crashed on approach in the nearby village of Sigingstone. 80 passengers and crew died, making the crash the worst air disaster in history at the time.

== National Eisteddfod venue ==
From 3 to 11 August 2012, a disused airfield near Llandow hosted the National Eisteddfod of Wales.
