= Avro Ashton =

1950s British airliner prototype

Ashton
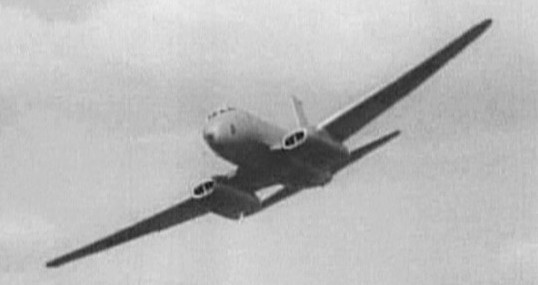
- Avro Ashton prototype

General information
- Type: Experimental airliner
- Manufacturer: Avro
- Number built: 6

History
- First flight: 1 September 1950
- Developed from: Avro Tudor

The Avro 706 Ashton was a British prototype jet airliner made by Avro during the 1950s. Although it flew nearly a year after the de Havilland Comet, it represented an experimental programme and was never intended for commercial use.

== Design and development ==
The Avro 689 Tudor 9 was based on the Avro 689 Tudor II piston-engined airliner using experience on work on the Rolls-Royce Nene jet-powered experimental variant, the Tudor 8, which made its first flight on 6 September 1948. The Avro Type 689 Tudor 9, later renamed the Avro 706 Ashton, was a four-jet-engined research aeroplane powered by Rolls-Royce Nene engines paired in wing nacelles.

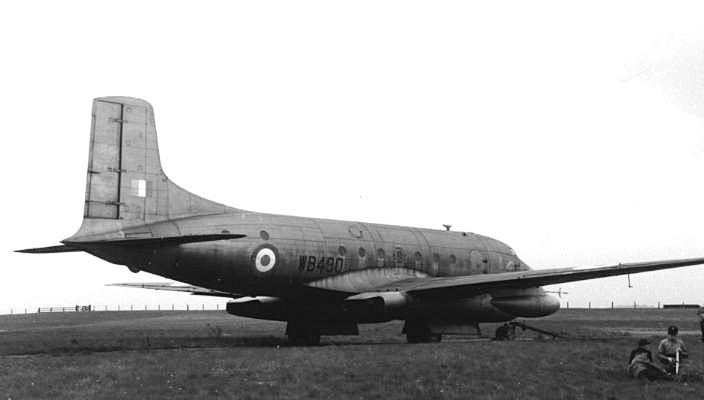
Avro Ashton 1 at Woodford Aerodrome, Cheshire, in May 1959

Six were built using the Tudor airframe, beginning with the conversion of Tudor I initially powered by Nene 5 engines. The Ashtons that followed incorporated the upgraded Nene 6 and featured an enlarged, "square-shaped" tail fin and tricycle landing gear replacing the original "taildragger" configuration. The engines were tightly grouped in two nacelles that were faired neatly into the wing but also extended below in streamlined pods. The four-engine arrangement compensated for the low thrust of the early jet engines and greatly reduced asymmetric effects in an "engine-out" scenario.

The crew was composed of a pilot, co-pilot, navigator, flight engineer and radio operator clustered together in the cockpit and front compartment of the Ashton. A larger complement could be carried in the spacious fuselage when warranted.

== Operational history ==
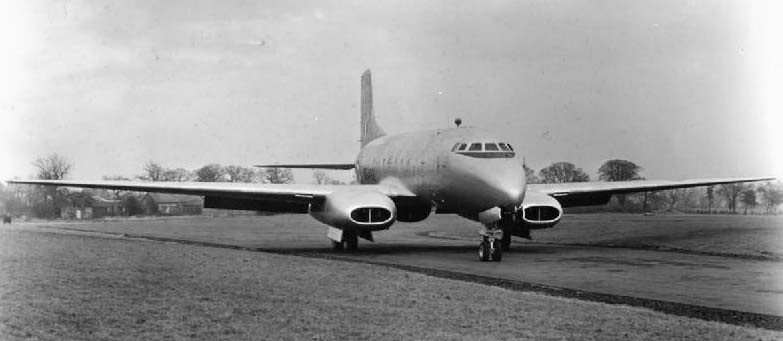
Avro Ashton WB492. c. 1952

Production was completed rapidly through modifications of surplus Tudor 2 airframes with a single example each of the Ashton 1 (WB490), Ashton 2 (WB491), Ashton 4 (WB494) and three Ashton 3s (WB492, WB493 and WE670), all built by Avro at Woodford. Test flights began in 1950 with evaluations of jet operations, navigation and at least one Ashton (Mk 4) tested bombing equipment with two streamlined underwing bomb containers fitted.

Despite being one of the first jet-engined air transports, the Ashton was engaged in primarily experimental work and was soon eclipsed in technology by the first of the full-scale production airliners, the de Havilland Comet.

Ashton WB491 was modified with an under-fuselage mounting for testing turbine engines. It was used by Rolls-Royce for trials with the Conway and Avon.

Bristol Siddeley used Ashton WB493 as a testbed for its Olympus turbojet. The aircraft was fitted with two Olympus engines under the wings, outboard of the Nenes. This aircraft had a starring role in the 1960 British movie Cone of Silence, masquerading as the "Atlas Phoenix". Later the same aircraft was used as a test bed for the Bristol Siddeley Orpheus, its port engine having been upgraded to the Orpheus features for trials.

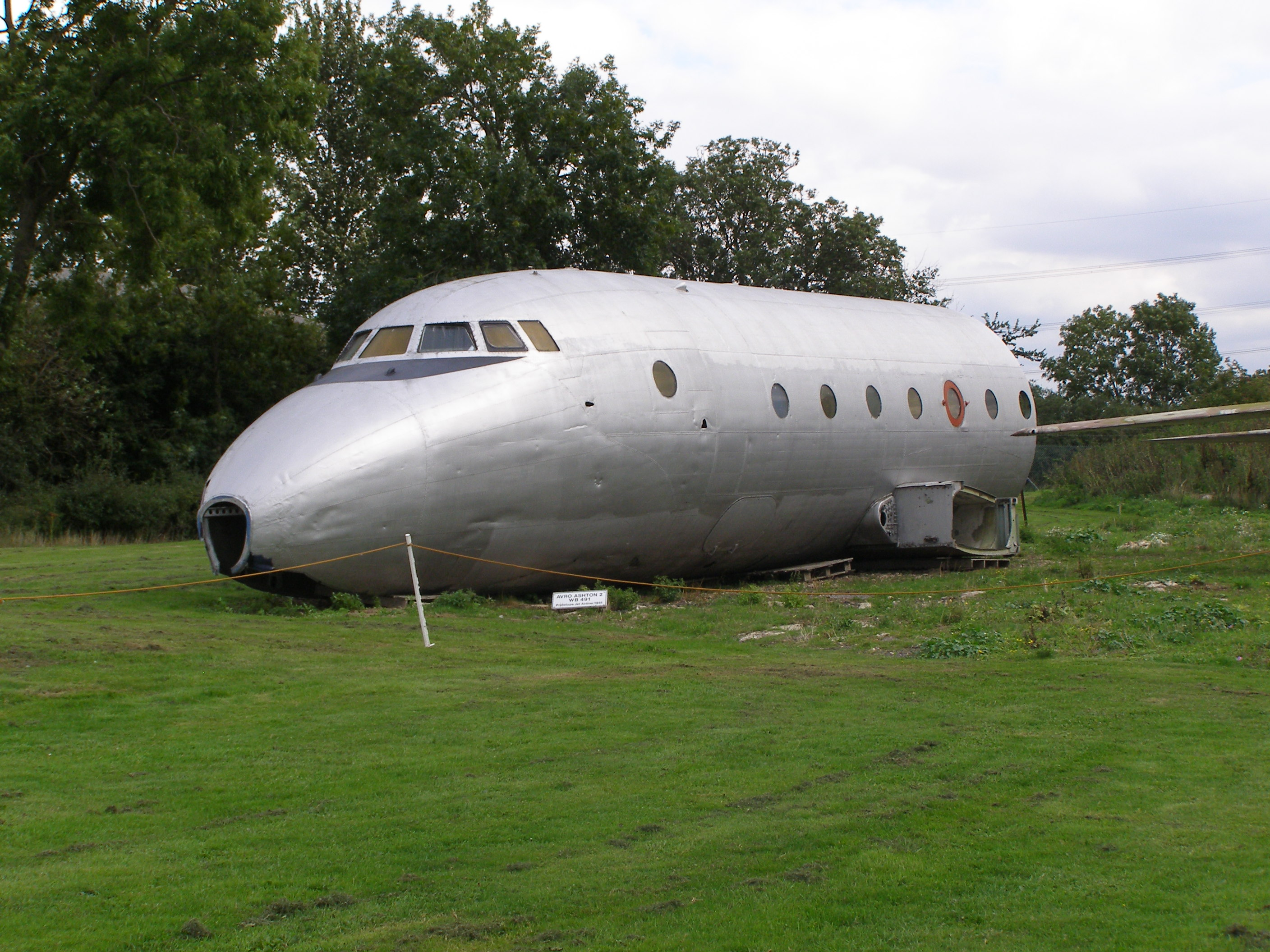
Avro Ashton fuselage at the Newark Air Museum

== Survivor ==
The forward fuselage of Ashton 2 (WB491) is preserved at the Newark Air Museum, Winthorpe, UK.

== Specifications (Avro Ashton) ==
Data from Jane's.

General characteristics

- Crew: 5
- Length: 89 ft 6.5 in (27.292 m)
- Wingspan: 120 ft (37 m)
- Height: 31 ft 3 in (9.53 m)
- Wing area: 1,421 sq ft (132.0 m^{2})
- Max takeoff weight: 82,000 lb (37,195 kg)
- Powerplant: 4 × Rolls-Royce Nene 6 centrifugal-flow turbojet engines, 5,000 lbf (22 kN) thrust each

Performance

- Maximum speed: 439 mph (707 km/h, 381 kn)
- Range: 1,725 mi (2,776 km, 1,499 nmi)
- Service ceiling: 40,500 ft (12,300 m)
- Rate of climb: 2,900 ft/min (15 m/s)

Armament

- Bombs: WB494, the sole Ashton Mk.4, had a bomb-aimers pressurised gondola and carried practice bombs in underwing bomb panniers

== See also ==
- Avro Canada C102 Jetliner

Related development

- Avro Tudor
