= Tydfil =

Welsh saint

Saint Tydfil
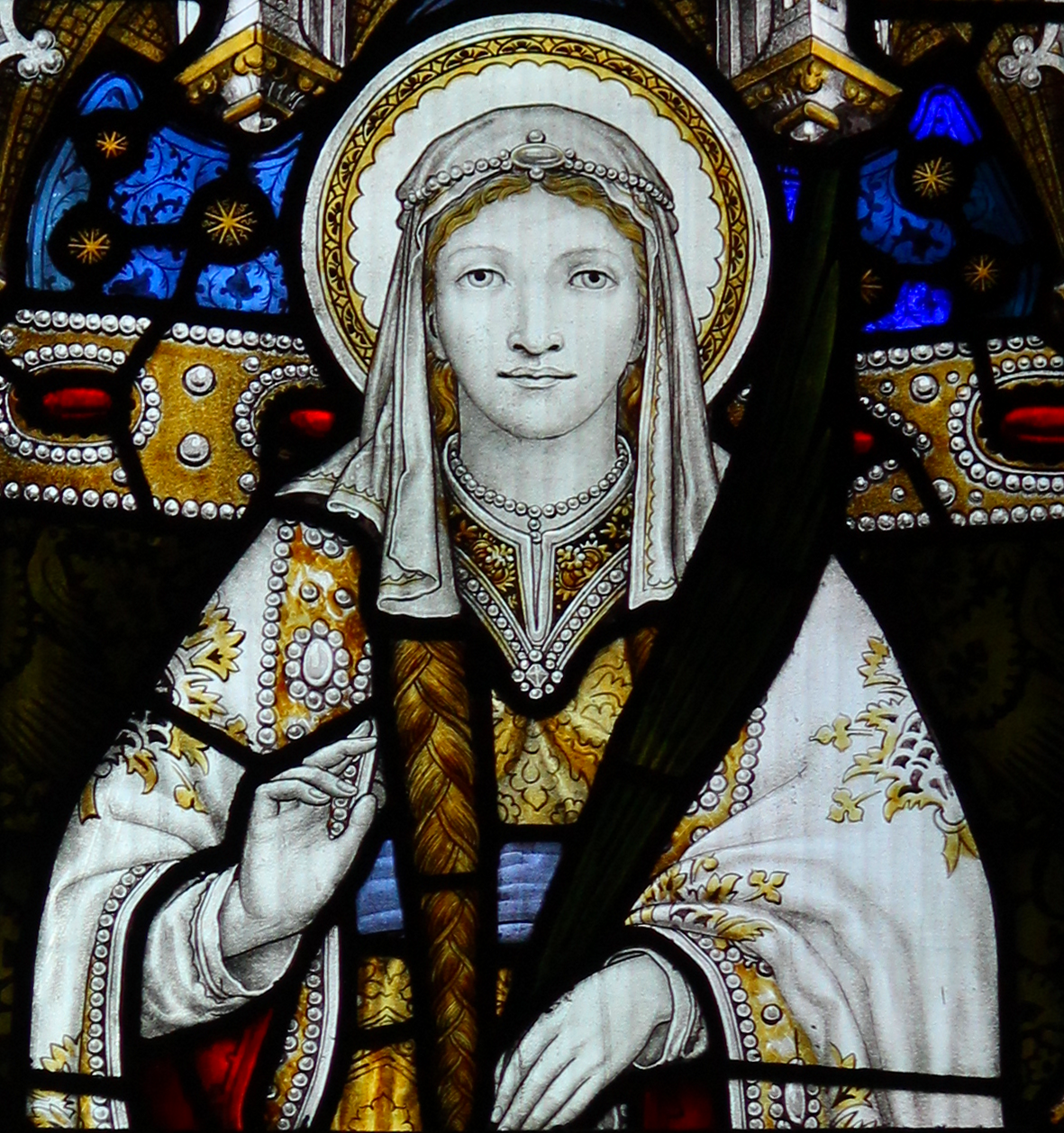
- Stained glass window of St Tydfil in Llandaff Cathedral
- Died: c. 480; Merthyr Tydfil, Wales
- Canonized: Pre-Congregation
- Feast: 23 August
- Patronage: Merthyr Tydfil

Saint Tydfil (Welsh: Tudful; martyred c. 480) is the legendary dedicatee of Merthyr Tydfil, Wales. The old parish church of St Tydfil, Merthyr Tydfil, is dedicated to her and is reputed to be the site of her death.

According to legend, Tydfil was the twenty-third daughter of Brychan, king of Brycheiniog, by his fourth wife. Tydfil was murdered with her brother Rhun in Merthyr Tydfil, by either Welsh pagans or Anglo-Saxon pagans, and buried in the town. No trace remains of her holy well Ffynnon Dydfil, which is thought to have been near the southern end of Well Street in Merthyr Tydfil. The daughter church of St Tydfil's Well is in the area of Merthyr Tydfil known as 'The Quar' (quarry).

St Tydfil's Church in Llysworney in the Vale of Glamorgan is dedicated to her, as was a chapel in Llantwit Major church until it was given to Tewkesbury Abbey.
