= RAF Llandow =

Former Royal Air Force station in the Vale of Glamorgan, Wales

RAF Llandow
- Llandow, Vale of Glamorgan in Wales

Site information
- Type: Royal Air Force station
- Owner: Air Ministry
- Operator: Royal Air Force
- Controlled by: RAF Fighter Command 1941-43 * No. 81 (OTU) Group RAF; RAF Maintenance Command 1943-

Location
- Shown within Vale of Glamorgan RAF Llandow (the United Kingdom)
- Coordinates: 51°26′0″N 03°29′45″W

Site history
- Built: 1937
- In use: 1937-1957
- Battles/wars: European theatre of World War II; Cold War

Airfield information
- Elevation: 88 metres (289 ft) AMSL
Runways
Direction	Length and surface
28/10	1,600 yards (1,463 m) Asphalt concrete
24/06	1,100 yards (1,006 m) Asphalt concrete
33/15	1,100 yards (1,006 m) Asphalt concrete

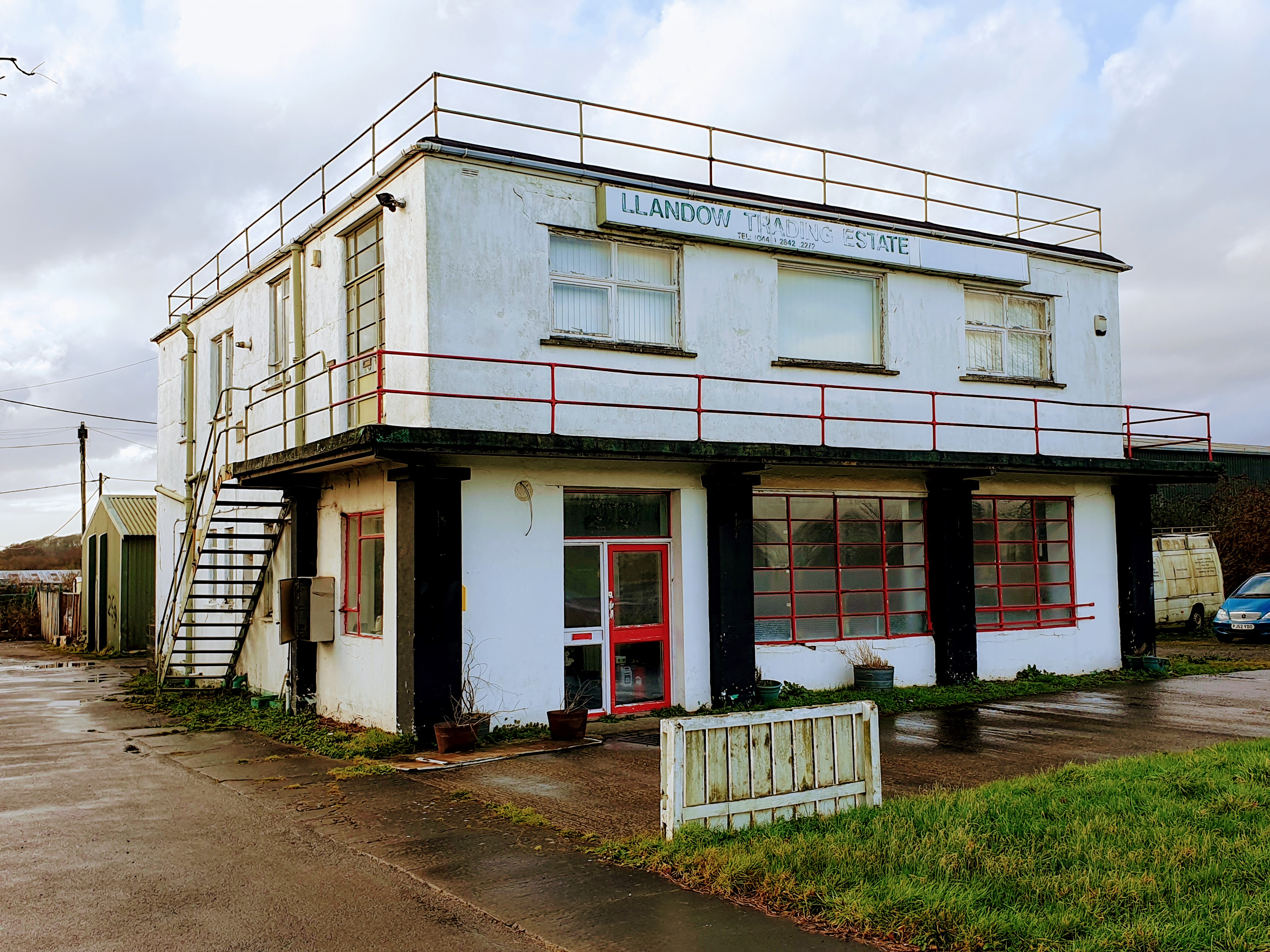
RAF Llandow Watch Office with Met section, in 2019

Royal Air Force Llandow or more simply RAF Llandow is a former Royal Air Force station situated near the village of Llandow, Vale of Glamorgan, South Wales, 15 miles (24 km) west of Cardiff.

It opened in 1940 and closed in 1957. It was while training at this airfield in 1941 that John Gillespie Magee, Jr. wrote his famous poem, 'High Flight'.

== History ==
From 1937 the site was initially a grass strip airfield supported by a small number of wooden buildings. A single L-type hangar was later constructed and then the runways were completed, in late 1941. This work was followed by eleven Super Robin hangars and seven more L-type hangars. The type 518/40 pattern control tower was added, along with some Pickett-Hamilton forts for airfield defence. More storage was added with two K-type hangars and two T2 hangars, these were complimented with a single J-type hangar, an A1 hangar and twelve blister hangars. The airfield had a concrete perimeter track which also included five loop dispersal points and forty frying pan dispersals.

The major RAF unit based at Llandow throughout its existence was No. 38 Maintenance Unit RAF (38 MU) which was tasked with the reception, storage and despatch of RAF aircraft. 38 MU opened on 1 April 1940 and closed on 15 March 1957.

Other wartime RAF units were based at Llandow between June 1941 and July 1944. The first was No. 53 Operational Training Unit RAF B Flight equipped with Supermarine Spitfires which arrived on 24 June 1941. A satellite station at RAF Rhoose (now Cardiff International Airport) was used by this unit. Three small transport flights were formed here during April 1944 with No. 1312 Flight RAF remaining based until 21 July 1944 with six Avro Anson I's for transporting urgent personnel to and from the Normandy landings area.

No. 614 (County of Glamorgan) Squadron AAF had been formed at RAF Pengam Moors in June 1937 before moving away at the outbreak of Second World War. Post war equipment required a larger airfield as base and Llandow was chosen. The Squadron officially reformed here on 10 May 1946 and the first Spitfire Mk 16's were received in November, being replaced by Mk 22's in August 1948. Jet Equipment in the form of de Havilland Vampire fighters arrived in July 1950 and continued in use until disbandment of the squadron on 10 March 1957, with all Royal Auxiliary Air Force units.

Another long-resident post-war flying unit based at Llandow was No. 663 Squadron RAFs No. 1952 Reserve AOP Flight, equipped with Auster AOP.6 aircraft for spotting for local Territorial Army artillery units. This flight was based here from 1 July 1949 until disbandment in March 1957.

The RAF's Burmese Conversion Squadron was based here for a period from 1953 to familiarise Burmese pilots with their newly acquired ex-RAF Supermarine Spitfire fighters.

No. 4 Civilian Anti-Aircraft Co-operation Unit was based at RAF Llandow between 1 August 1951 and 1 July 1954 equipped with de Havilland Mosquito and Spitfire aircraft to tow targets and act as targets for army units in South Wales and nearby areas.

The Llandow air disaster occurred on 12 March 1950 when an Avro Tudor V airliner G-AKBY of Airflight crashed on final approach to runway 28 at RAF Llandow. The aircraft was returning from Dublin Airport with five crew and 80 rugby supporters, all except three passengers being killed.

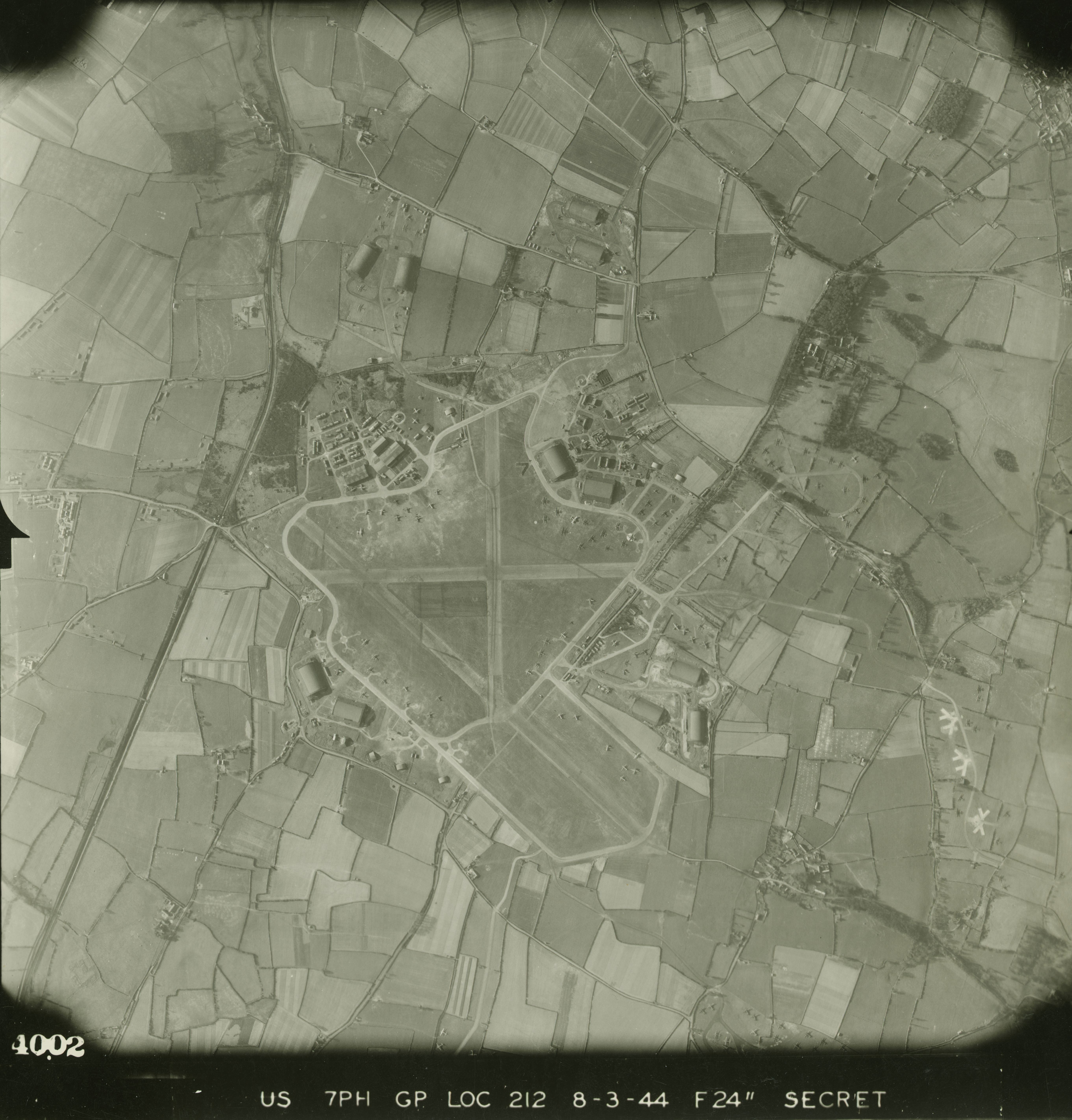
RAF Llandow - 3rd August 1944

== Units ==
The following units were also here at some point:

- No. 3 Overseas Aircraft Preparation Unit RAF between July 1943 and July 1944 became No. 3 Aircraft Preparation Unit RAF between July 1944 and August 1945
- No. 5 Squadron RAF
- No. 91 (Forward) Staging Post during September 1944
- No. 93 (Forward) Staging Post between September and November 1944 became No. 93 Staging Post between November and December 1944
- No. 1310 (Transport) Flight RAF between April and May 1944
- No. 1311 (Transport) Flight RAF between April and May 1944
- No. 1577 Flight RAF between August and September 1943
- No. 2847 Squadron RAF Regiment
- Transport Command Night Vision Training School RAF between April 1944 and February 1945 became Transport Command Night Vision Instructors Training School RAF between February and July 1945

== Current Use ==
The airfield is now in use as Llandow Kart Club, Llandow Tuning Center and Llandow Circuit, with the main runways of the former RAF base being used as Hangar Straight and Spitfire Straight in the kart circuit. The names of the corners and straights of the kart circuit reference Llandow's history as an airfield, with names such as Hangar Straight, Bomber Straight, Lancaster Curve and Spitfire Straight.
