= Llandow air disaster =

1950 plane crash in Sigingstone, Wales

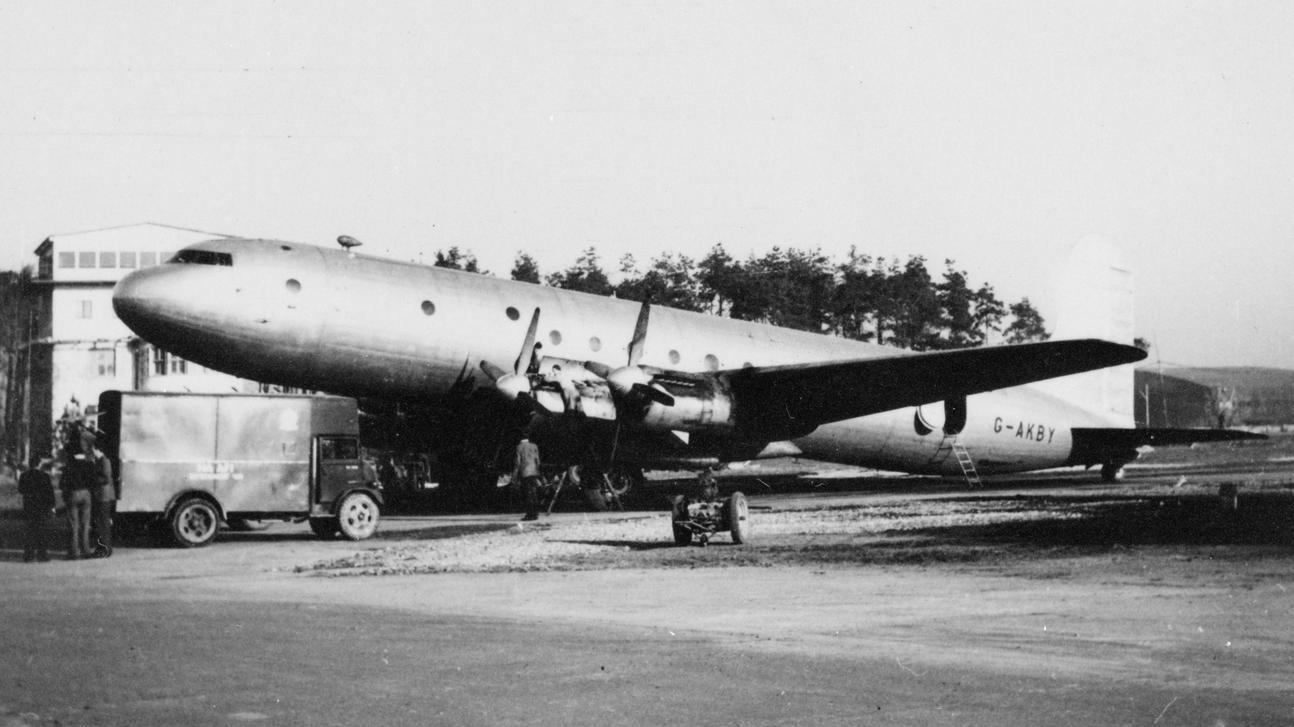
- G-AKBY, the aircraft involved in the accident

Accident
- Date: 12 March 1950
- Summary: Stalled due to improper aircraft loading
- Site: Sigingstone, near Llandow aerodrome, Wales; 51°26′04″N 3°28′39″W

Aircraft
- Aircraft type: Avro 689 Tudor V
- Operator: Airflight operating as Fairflight
- Registration: G-AKBY
- Flight origin: Dublin Airport
- Destination: Llandow aerodrome
- Occupants: 83
- Passengers: 78
- Crew: 5
- Fatalities: 80
- Injuries: 3
- Survivors: 3

The Llandow air disaster was an aircraft accident in Wales in 1950. At that time it was the world's worst air disaster, with a total of 80 fatalities. The aircraft, an Avro Tudor V, had been privately hired to fly rugby union enthusiasts to and from an international game in Ireland. On the return flight the aircraft stalled and crashed on its approach to land.

== Course of events ==
On 12 March 1950, an Avro 689 Tudor V, Star Girl, owned by Airflight Limited and being operated under the "Fairflight" name, took off from Dublin Airport in Ireland, on a private passenger flight to Llandow aerodrome in South Wales. The aircraft had 78 passengers and 5 crew on the manifest. The flight had been chartered privately for a trip to Belfast to watch the Welsh rugby union team compete against the Irish in the Five Nations Championship at the Ravenhill Stadium. The aircraft had been initially booked for 72 passengers, but the plane had been stripped to accommodate another six.

The weather conditions were clear, and no incident was reported after the outbound journey aboard the same aircraft.

Eyewitnesses (including a Mr Russell) state that at 3:05 pm the Avro Tudor was approaching runway 28 of Llandow aerodrome at an abnormally low altitude with the undercarriage down. The pilot attempted to correct the descent by increasing the power of the engines and brought the plane up. The aircraft rose steeply to 100 m (300 ft) attaining a nose-up attitude of 35 degrees to the vertical, and then the aircraft stalled.

Star Girl plummeted towards the ground with the right wingtip hitting the ground first, followed in turn by the plane's nose and left wing, which separated from the fuselage when it made contact. The plane turned clockwise and finally came to a rest near a field beside Park Farm close to the small hamlet of Sigingstone (or Sigginstone). There was no explosion on impact or ground fire.

Two passengers who were sitting in additional seats bolted in at the back of the tail section walked away unaided, and a third man, who was in the lavatory and knocked unconscious at the time of the crash, survived but was in the hospital for four months. Eight more survivors of the initial impact died later in hospitals of their injuries, bringing the final death toll to 80, 75 passengers and all five crew.

The March 13, 1950, edition of The New York Times reported: "London, 12 March—Eighty men and women were killed in Wales today in an aeroplane crash, the worst disaster in the history of aviation. Three men survived. The death toll eclipsed the previous record for airplanes, set last Nov. 2, when a fighter plane rammed an airliner near the National Airport in Washington, causing the deaths of fifty-five persons. It also exceeded the toll of seventy-three dead in the loss of the United States Navy dirigible Akron off Barnegat, N.J., on 4 April 1933. The eighty persons lost in Wales went to their destruction in a type of aircraft – the British Avro Tudor – that had already caused fifty-four fatalities and had been banned from passenger service on Britain's publicly owned international airlines."

== Investigation ==
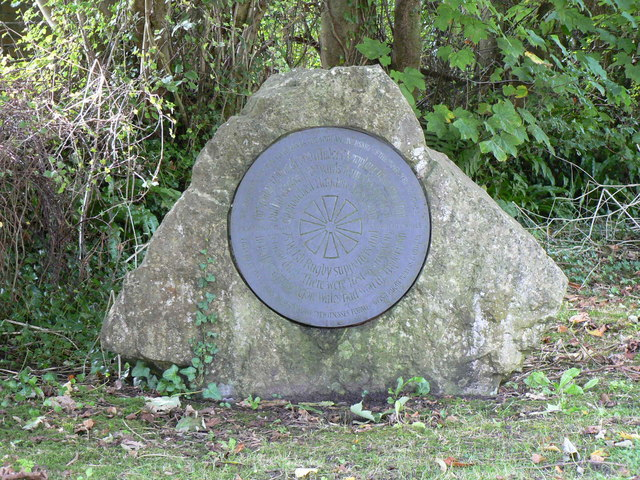
Memorial plaque in Sigingstone dedicated in 1990 on the 40th anniversary of the crash.

After a court of enquiry chaired by William McNair KC the Ministry of Civil Aviation announced that the probable cause of the accident was the loading of the aircraft, which had moved the centre of gravity considerably aft of where it should have been, thus reducing the effectiveness of the elevators.

== Memorial ==
Amongst those who died were three members of Abercarn Rugby Football Club. Llanharan RFC lost six members of their playing team. Both clubs remember the victims with symbolism on their club badges. On 25 March in the final game of the 1950 Championship against France at the Cardiff Arms Park, the crowd stood in silence while five buglers sounded a Last Post tribute to the memory of the supporters who had died in the plane crash.

== See also ==
- 1950 in aviation
- List of accidents and incidents involving commercial aircraft
