= Avro Tudor =

British airliner with 4 piston engines, 1945

Type 688 Tudor
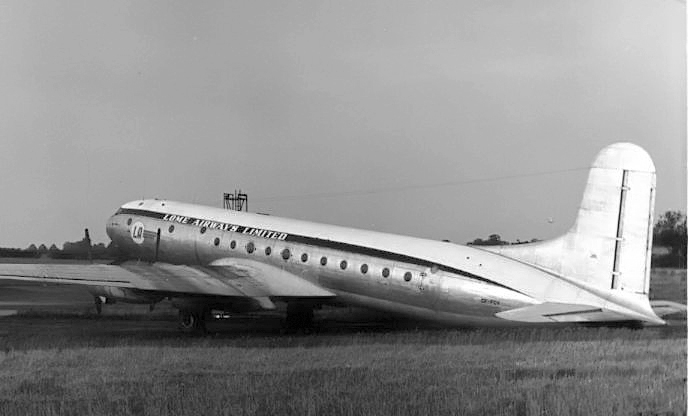
- Avro Tudor 5 of Lome Airways (Canada) at London Stansted Airport in September 1953

General information
- Type: Airliner
- Manufacturer: Avro
- Designer: Roy Chadwick
- Primary users: B.S.A.A BOAC
- Number built: 38

History
- Manufactured: 1945–1949
- First flight: 14 June 1945
- Developed from: Avro Lincoln
- Developed into: Avro Ashton

The Avro Type 688 Tudor was a British piston-engined airliner based on Avro's four-engine Lincoln bomber, itself a descendant of the famous Lancaster heavy bomber, and was Britain's first pressurised airliner. Customers saw the aircraft as little more than a pressurised DC-4, and few orders were forthcoming, important customers preferring to buy US aircraft. The tailwheel undercarriage layout was also dated and a disadvantage.

== Development ==
Avro began work on the Type 688 Tudor in 1943, following Specification 29/43 for a commercial adaptation of the Lancaster IV bomber, which was later renamed Lincoln. The specification was based on recommendations of the Brabazon Committee, which issued specifications for nine types of commercial aircraft for postwar use.

Avro first proposed to build the Avro 687 (Avro XX), which was a Lincoln bomber with a new circular section pressurized fuselage and a large single fin and rudder in place of the predecessor's double ones. During the design stage, the idea of a simple conversion was abandoned and the Avro 688 was designed, which retained the four Rolls-Royce Merlin engines. It was designed by Roy Chadwick who, due to wartime restrictions, could not design a completely new aircraft, but had to use existing parts, tools and jigs. Using the Lincoln's wing, Chadwick, who had worked on the Lancaster, designed the Tudor to incorporate a new pressurized fuselage of circular cross-section, with a useful load of 3,765 lb (1,705 kg) and a range of 3,975 mi (6,400 km).

Two prototypes were ordered in September 1944 and the first, G-AGPF, was assembled by Avro's experimental flight department at Manchester's Ringway Airport and first flew on 14 June 1945. It was the first British pressurised civilian aircraft, although the prototype initially flew unpressurised. The prototype Tudor I had 1,750 hp (1,305 kW) Rolls-Royce Merlin 102 engines, but the standard engines were 1,770 hp (1,320 kW) Merlin 621s.

== Design ==
The Tudor was a low-wing cantilever monoplane with four engines, a single fin and rudder and a retractable tailwheel undercarriage (in its original configurations).

The wing was of NACA 23018 section at the root, and was a five-piece, all-metal, twin-spar structure. The untapered centre section carried the inboard engines and main undercarriage, while the inner and outer sections were tapered on their leading and trailing edges, with the inner sections carrying the outboard engines. The ailerons were fitted with trim and balance tabs, and there were hydraulically operated split flaps in three sections on each side of the trailing edges of the centre section and inner wings. A 3,300 imp gal (15,000 L; 4,000 US gal) fuel capacity was given by eight bag tanks, one on either side of the fuselage in the centre section and three in both inner wings.

The all-metal tail unit had a dorsal fin integrated with the fuselage, and a 43 ft (13 m) twin-spar tailplane with inset divided elevators. The control surfaces were mass-balanced, and each had controllable trim and servo tabs.

The circular cross-section fuselage was an all-metal semi-monocoque structure, of 10 ft (3.0 m) diameter, fitted with kapok noise insulation above floor level. The hydraulically operated main-wheel units were similar to those of the Lancaster, had single Dunlop wheels and retracted rearward into the inboard engine nacelles. The twin tailwheels retracted rearward into the fuselage and were enclosed by twin longitudinal doors.

== Operational history ==
=== Tudor I ===
The Tudor I was intended for use on the North Atlantic route. At the time, the United States had the Douglas DC-4 and Lockheed Constellation, which could both carry more passengers than the Tudor (which only carried 12), and also weighed less than the Tudor weight of 70,000 lb (32,000 kg). The Tudor tailwheel layout was also obsolete. Despite this, the Ministry of Supply ordered 14 Tudor I aircraft for BOAC, and increased the production order to 20 in April 1945.

The Tudor I suffered from a number of stability problems, which included longitudinal and directional instability. The problem was handed over to the Royal Aircraft Establishment at RAE Farnborough, where an extensive programme of testing was carried out, the test pilot being Eric Brown. Following the RAE's recommendations, a larger tailplane was fitted, and the original fin and rudder were replaced by larger vertical surfaces. BOAC added to the delays by requesting more than 340 modifications, and finally rejected the Tudor I on 11 April 1947, considering it unacceptable for North Atlantic operations. It had been intended that 12 Tudors would be built in Australia for military transport, but this plan was abandoned.

Twelve Tudor I aircraft were built, of which three were scrapped, while others were variously converted to the Tudor IVB and Tudor Freighter I configurations.

As a result of all the Tudor I delays, BOAC – with the support of the Ministry of Civil Aviation – sought permission to purchase aircraft with known performance and reliability, such as the Lockheed Constellation and the Boeing Stratocruiser, for its Atlantic routes instead of the Tudor. Despite BOAC's reluctance to purchase Tudors, the Ministry of Supply continued to subsidize the aircraft.

=== Tudor II ===
The passenger capacity of the Avro 688 was considered unsatisfactory, so a larger version was planned from the outset. Designated the Avro 689 (also Avro XXI), the Tudor II was designed as a 60-seat passenger aircraft for BOAC, with the fuselage lengthened to 105 ft 7 in (32.18 m) compared to the Tudor I's 79 ft 6 in (24.23 m) and the fuselage increased by 1 ft (0.30 m) to 11 ft (3.4 m) diameter, making it the largest UK airliner at the time.

At the end of 1944, while it was still in the design stage, BOAC, Qantas and South African Airways decided to standardise on the Tudor II for Commonwealth air routes, and BOAC increased its initial order for 30 examples to 79.

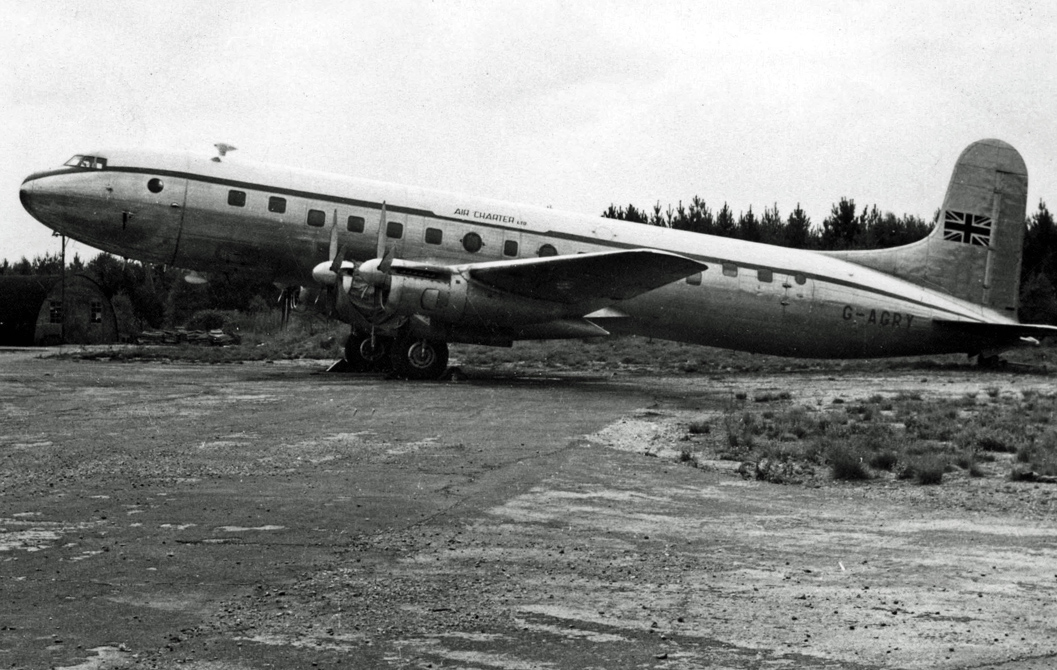
Tudor 2 of Air Charter Limited at London Stansted Airport in 1955

The prototype Tudor II G-AGSU first flew on 10 March 1946 at Woodford Aerodrome. The changes in design had however resulted in a loss of performance and the aircraft could not be used in hot and high conditions which resulted in Qantas ordering the Constellation and South African Airways, the Douglas DC-4 instead, with the total order reduced to 50.

During further testing, the prototype was destroyed on 23 August 1947 in a fatal crash on take off from Woodford which killed Roy Chadwick; air accident investigators later discovered that the crash was due to incorrect assembly of the aileron control circuit.

The engines on the second prototype were changed to Bristol Hercules radials and the aircraft became the prototype Tudor 7, which did not go into production. Unimpressed by the type's performance during further tropical trials, BOAC did not operate the Tudor II and only three production Tudor IIs were built. Six aircraft were built for British South American Airways (BSAA) as the Tudor V.

The third of the pre-production Tudor 2s, initially G-AGRZ, was used for pressurisation tests as VZ366 at RAE Farnborough.

The second Tudor II to be completed, G-AGRY, went to Nairobi for tropical trials as VX202, but these were unsatisfactory and Tudor II orders were reduced to 18. Eventually, only four Tudor IIs were completed including the prototype.

From 1946 on, the potential purchase of US aircraft by operators such as BOAC led to criticism of government policy, because of the damage that could potentially be caused to Britain's civil aircraft industry by a failure to buy the Tudor. L.G.S. Payne, The Daily Telegraph's aeronautical correspondent, said that British government policy had led to the development of aircraft which were uncompetitive in price, performance and economy. He blamed the Ministry of Supply's planners for this failure, since the industry had effectively been nationalised and argued that the government should pursue the development of jet aircraft instead of "interim types" such as the Tudor.

BOAC cancelled its order for Tudors in 1947, instead taking delivery of 22 Canadair North Stars which they renamed C-4 Argonauts, and used them extensively between 1949 and 1960.

Six aircraft ordered as Tudor IIs were intended to be modified with tricycle landing gear, for use by BSAA as freighters, and designated the 711 Trader. They were not built, but a parallel design using the same landing gear was produced as the jet-powered Avro Ashton.

=== Tudor III ===
Two Tudor Is, G-AIYA and G-AJKC, were sent to Armstrong Whitworth for completion as VIP transports for cabinet ministers. They could accommodate 10 passengers and had nine berths. They were re-registered as VP301 and VP312, and both were acquired by Aviation Traders in September 1953, VP301 being reconverted into a Tudor I.

In 1955, G-AIYA and the Tudor I G-AGRG were lengthened to Tudor IV standard. Together with the un-lengthened Tudor I G-AGRI, which had become a 42-seat passenger aircraft, they were used on the Air Charter Ltd Colonial Coach Services between the UK, Tripoli and Lagos.

=== Tudor IV ===
To meet a BSAA requirement, some Tudor Is were lengthened by 5 ft 9 in (1.75 m), powered by 1,770 hp (1,320 kW) Rolls-Royce Merlin 621s and 1,760 hp (1,310 kW) Rolls-Royce Merlin 623s. With 32 seats and no flight engineer position, these were known as Tudor IVs, and when fitted with a flight engineer's position and 28 seats, as Tudor IVBs.

BSAA's new flagships received mixed reviews from pilots. Some greeted it with enthusiasm, such as Captain Geoffrey Womersley, who described it as "the best civil airliner flying." Others rejected it as an unsound design. BSAA's chief pilot and manager of operations, Gordon Store, was unimpressed:

The Tudor was built like a battleship. It was noisy, I had no confidence in its engines and its systems were hopeless. The Americans were fifty years ahead of us in systems engineering. All the hydraulics, the air conditioning equipment and the recircling [sic] fans were crammed together underneath the floor without any thought. There were fuel-burning heaters that would never work; we had the floorboards up in flight again and again.

The Tudor IV's fuel-burning heaters were made by Janitrol and were also used on the US-built passenger aircraft – such as the Lockheed Constellation – as well as later on US-ordered variants of the Vickers Viscount.

The first example, G-AHNJ Star Panther, first flew on 9 April 1947. The Tudor IV received its Certificate of Airworthiness on 18 July 1947, and on 29 September, BSAA took delivery of G-AHNK Star Lion, the first of its six Tudor 4s to be delivered. It departed the next day from Heathrow on a flight to South America, and on 31 October began flights from London to Havana via Lisbon, the Azores, Bermuda and Nassau.

On the night of 29–30 January 1948, Tudor IV G-AHNP Star Tiger, with 31 people on board, disappeared without trace between Santa Maria in the Azores and Bermuda. Tudors were temporarily grounded and while the cause of the accident was never determined, the type returned to service on 3 December 1948, when a weekly service was begun from London to Buenos Aires via Gander, Bermuda, and other stops, returning via the Azores.

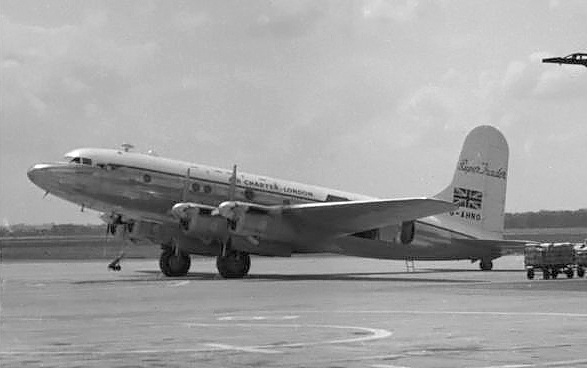
Avro 688 Super Trader 4B "Conqueror" of Air Charter Ltd at Manchester's Ringway Airport in June 1955

Disaster struck again on 17 January 1949, when Tudor IV G-AGRE Star Ariel also disappeared, this time between Bermuda and Kingston, Jamaica, with the loss of 20 people, and the Tudor IVs were once more grounded. The subsequent fleet shortage led to BSAA being taken over by BOAC. Pressurisation problems were suspected to be the cause of the two accidents, and the remaining aircraft were flown as unpressurised freighters under the designations Tudor Freighter IV and IVB.

A Tudor IV was tested at De Havilland's Hatfield Airfield on 1 April 1949 to check "no lift angle" and flown to Heathrow on 8 April.

After storage for some years at Manchester Airport, four ex-BSAAC Tudor IVs were bought by Air Charter Limited in late 1953. They were fitted with 6 ft 10 in (2.08 m) by 5 ft 5 in (1.65 m) cargo doors aft by Aviation Traders and designated Super Traders IV or IVB, receiving their Certificate of Airworthiness in March 1955. These were operated by Air Charter Ltd on long distance freight flights as far as Christmas Island. Some remained in service until 1959, until G-AGRH Zephyr crashed in Turkey on 23 April 1959.

=== Tudor V ===
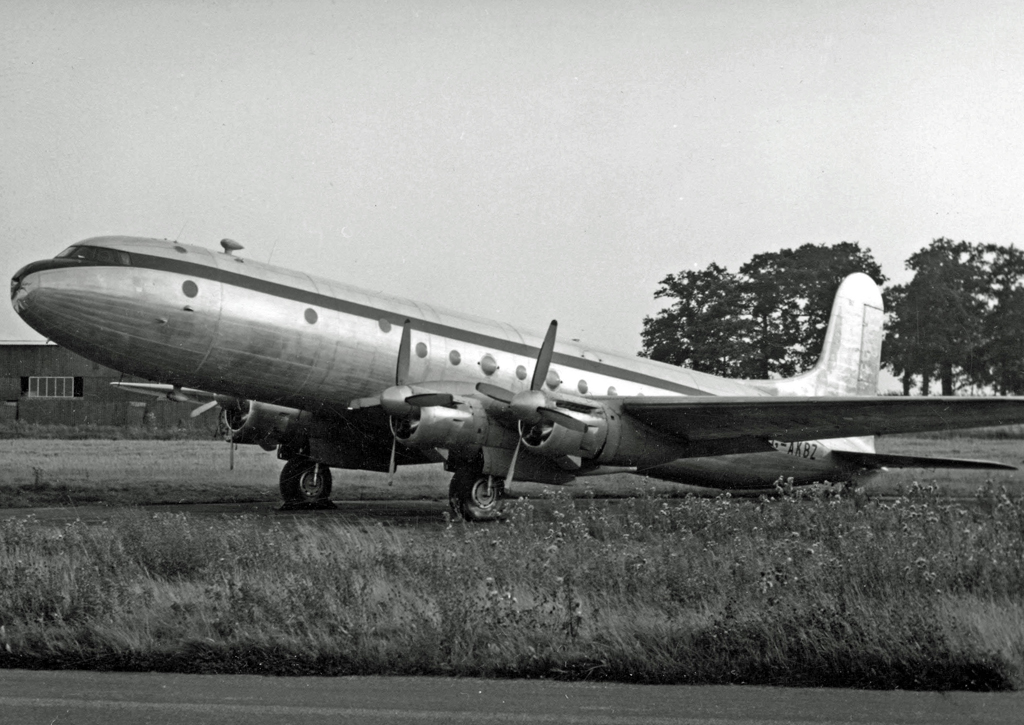
Tudor V ex BSAAC and BOAC in storage at London Stansted Airport in 1953

The Tudor V was a modified version of the stretched Tudor II equipped with 44 seats. BSAA acquired five which never entered passenger service with the airline. They were instead stripped of their fittings and used as fuel tankers on the Berlin Airlift. They completed a total of 2,562 supply sorties in 6,973 hours, carrying 22,125 tons (20,071 tonnes) of fuel into Berlin.

On 12 March 1950, G-AKBY, which had been returned to passenger service with Airflight Ltd, on a rugby charter flight carrying Welsh supporters back from Ireland, crashed at RAF Llandow, South Wales, with the resulting death of 80 of its 83 passengers and crew.

In 1953, Lome Airways leased an ex BSAA Tudor 5 from Surrey Flying Services as CF-FCY for freight operations in Canada. It was retired at Stansted and scrapped in 1959.

=== Tudor VI ===
The Tudor VI was to be built for the Argentinian airline FAMA for South Atlantic service, with 32–38 seats or 22 sleeper berths, but none were built.

=== Tudor VII ===
The Tudor VII was the first production Tudor II fitted with Bristol Hercules air-cooled radial engines in an attempt to give better performance. The sole example built, G-AGRX, made its first flight on 17 April 1946, and was later fitted in June 1948 with shorter landing gear with the engines repositioned (inclined) to give better ground clearance. G-AGRX was used for cabin temperature experiments, and was finally sold for spares in March 1954.

=== Tudor 8 ===
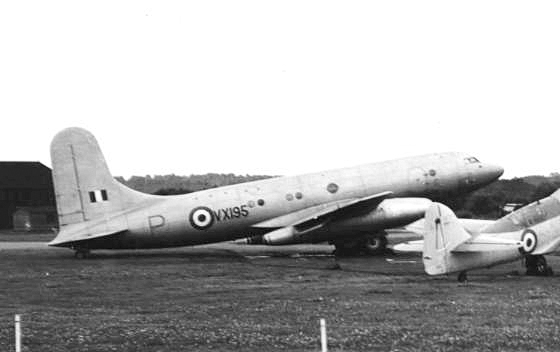
Avro Tudor 8 fitted with Nene jet engines at RAE Farnborough in September 1950

The second prototype Tudor I was rebuilt to Tudor IV standards. It was later fitted with four Rolls-Royce Nene 4 turbojets in under-wing paired nacelles. Given the serial VX195, The Tudor 8 carried out its first flight at Woodford on 6 September 1948, and a few days later, it was demonstrated at the SBAC Show at Farnborough. Later, the Tudor 8 was used for high-altitude tests at Boscombe Down and RAE Farnborough before being broken up in 1951.

=== Tudor 9 ===
Following tests of the Tudor 8, the Ministry of Supply ordered six Tudor 9s, based on the Tudor II but powered by four Rolls-Royce Nenes and utilizing a tricycle undercarriage. The original design was then modified and the type was produced as the Avro 706 Ashton with the first Ashton flying on 1 September 1950.

== Variants ==
All except the prototype built by Avro at their Chadderton factory and assembled and test flown from Woodford Aerodrome.

688 Tudor 1
Production variant, 12 built, later conversion to other variants.
689 Tudor 2
Stretched version, five built.
688 Tudor 3
Tudor 1 modified by Armstrong Whitworth Aircraft as executive transport aircraft. It could seat up to nine passengers, two built.
688 Tudor 4
Stretched version of the Tudor 1 (but not the same as the Tudor 2 with the fuselage lengthened by only 6 ft/1.83 m). It could seat up to 32 passengers, 11 built.
688 Tudor 4B
As Tudor 4 but retained the Tudor 1's flight engineers station. Small number of Tudor 1s were converted into Tudor 4Bs.
689 Tudor 5
Tudor 2 for BSAA, powered by four 1,770 hp (1,320 kW) Rolls-Royce Merlin 621 piston engines, six built. One aircraft crashed in 1950 killing 80 in the Llandow Air Disaster.
689 Tudor 6
Ordered by the Argentinian airline FAMA, but the order was cancelled. None of the airframes were completed.
689 Tudor 7
Tudor 2 fitted with four 1,750 hp (1,305 kW) Bristol Hercules 120 radial piston engines, one prototype only.
688 Tudor 8
Jet-engined version of the Tudor 1. Tudor 1 VX195 was fitted with four Rolls-Royce Nene 4 turbojet engines.
Tudor 9
Jet-engined version of the Tudor 2, became the 706 Ashton
Super Trader 4B
Re-engined version, fitted with four 1,760 hp (1,312 kW) Rolls-Royce Merlin 23 piston engines.
Tudor Freighter 1
Freight and cargo version, three aircraft were used by BOAC during the 1949 Berlin Airlift.
711 Trader
Proposed freighter development of the Tudor 2 fitted with a tricycle landing gear; not built.

== Operators ==
Canada
- Lome Airways

United Kingdom

- Air Charter
- Airflight
- British Overseas Airways Corporation (BOAC) (freight only)
- British South American Airways
- Surrey Flying Services
- William Dempster (airline)

== Accidents and incidents ==
- 23 August 1947 – Tudor 2 prototype G-AGSU crashed on takeoff from Woodford, killing Avro designer Roy Chadwick.
- 30 January 1948 – Tudor 1 G-AHNP Star Tiger of British South American Airways disappeared in the western Atlantic.
- 17 January 1949 – Tudor 4B G-AGRE Star Ariel of British South American Airways disappeared in the western Atlantic.
- 12 March 1950 – Tudor 5 G-AKBY Star Girl of Airflight Limited crashed on approach, Llandow, Glamorgan, United Kingdom.
- 26 October 1951 – Tudor 5 G-AKCC President Kruger of William Dempster Limited was damaged beyond repair landing at Bovingdon, Hertfordshire, United Kingdom.
- 27 January 1959 – Super Trader G-AGRG El Alamein of Air Charter destroyed by fire on takeoff from Brindisi, Italy.
- 23 April 1959 – Super Trader G-AGRH Zephyr of Air Charter flew into Mount Suphan, Turkey.

== Specifications (Avro 688 Tudor 1) ==
Data from Jane's Fighting Aircraft of World War II

General characteristics

- Crew: 5 (two pilots, flight engineer, radio operator, navigator)
- Capacity: 24 passengers
- Length: 79 ft 6 in (24.23 m)
- Wingspan: 120 ft 0 in (36.58 m)
- Height: 22 ft 0 in (6.71 m)
- Wing area: 1,421 sq ft (132.0 m^{2})
- Airfoil: root: NACA 23018; tip: NACA 23009
- Max takeoff weight: 76,000 lb (34,473 kg)
- Maximum landing weight: 66,000 lb (29,937 kg)
- Powerplant: 4 × Rolls-Royce Merlin 100 V-12 liquid-cooled piston engines, 1,770 hp (1,320 kW) each for take-off
- Propellers: 4-bladed Rotol constant-speed fully-feathering propellers

Performance

- Maximum speed: 290 mph (470 km/h, 250 kn) at 66,000 lb (29,937 kg) at sea level

320 mph (278 kn; 515 km/h) at 8,000 ft (2,438 m)
346 mph (301 kn; 557 km/h) at 20,000 ft (6,096 m)

- Cruise speed: 242 mph (389 km/h, 210 kn) at 66,000 lb (29,937 kg) at sea level

283 mph (246 kn; 455 km/h) at 12,000 ft (3,658 m)
300 mph (261 kn; 483 km/h) at 22,500 ft (6,858 m)

- Range: 4,660 mi (7,500 km, 4,050 nmi) maximum fuel

4,100 mi (3,563 nmi; 6,598 km) with maximum payload

- Maximum range:' 4,890 mi (4,249 nmi; 7,870 km) at 10,000 ft (3,048 m) (engines delivering 500 hp (373 kW))
- Service ceiling: 30,100 ft (9,200 m)

24,300 ft (7,407 m) on 3 engines
10,000 ft (3,048 m) on 2 engines

- Absolute ceiling: 31,500 ft (9,601 m)

26,000 ft (7,925 m) on 3 engines
12,400 ft (3,780 m) on 2 engines

- Rate of climb: 990 ft/min (5.0 m/s) at sea level

730 ft/min (3.7 m/s) at 20,000 ft (6,096 m)

- Wing loading: 53.5 lb/sq ft (261 kg/m^{2})

== See also ==
Related development

- Avro Lincoln
- Avro Lancastrian
- Avro Ashton

Aircraft of comparable role, configuration, and era

- Vickers VC.1 Viking
