= Malta air crash =

Malta air crash may refer to:

- 1945 Avro York crash, 1945 air accident
- 1946 Rabat Vickers Wellington crash, 1946 air accident
- 1975 Żabbar Avro Vulcan crash, 1975 air accident
- Żurrieq Scottish Airlines crash, 1956 air accident

== See also ==
- 1990 Faucett Perú Boeing 727 disappearance, 1990 airplane disappearance
