= 1952 Luqa Avro Lancaster crash =

1952 military aviation accident in Luqa, Malta

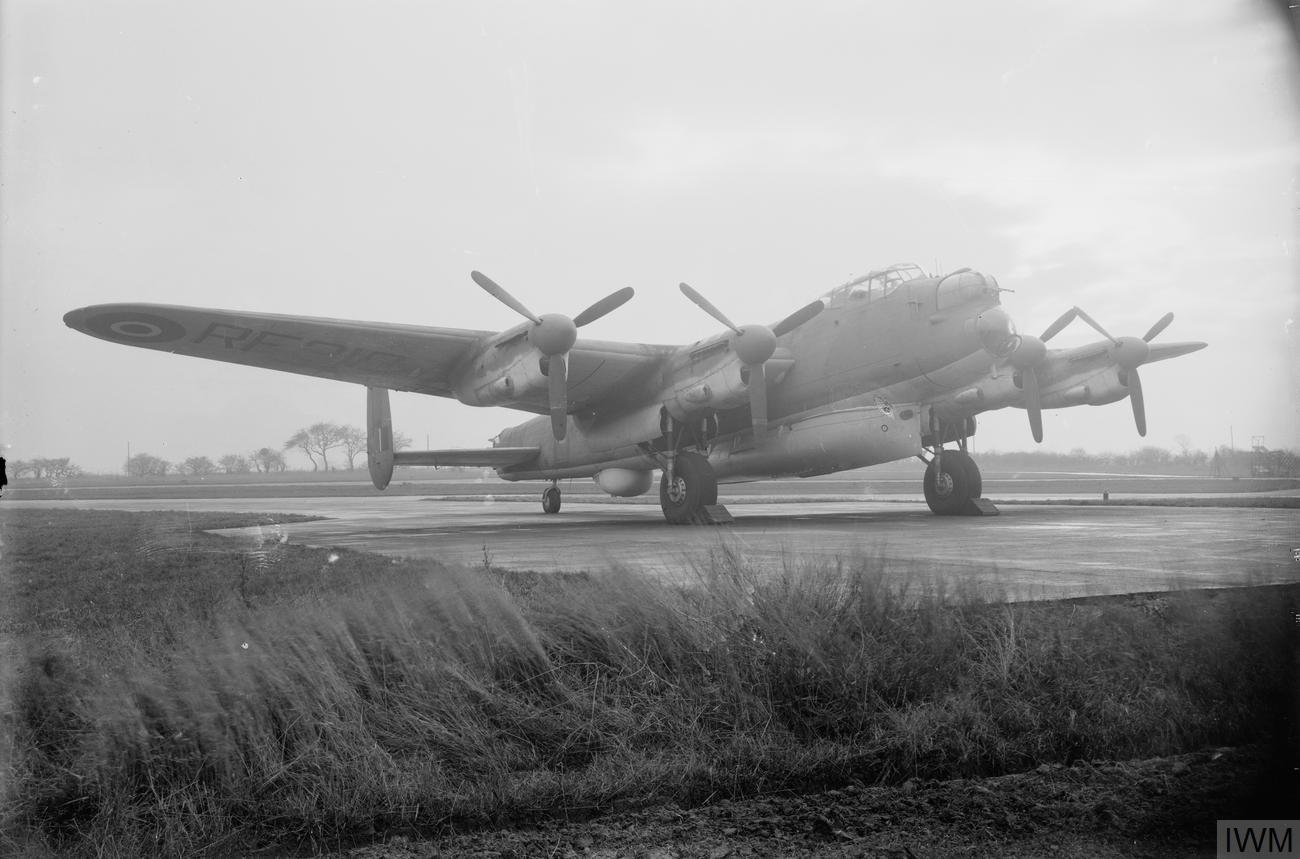
- Avro Lancaster similar to the accident aircraft

Accident
- Date: 30 December 1952
- Summary: Engine failure
- Site: Luqa, Crown Colony of Malta; 35°51′30.5″N 14°29′21.9″E
- Total fatalities: 4
- Total injuries: 3

Aircraft
- Aircraft type: Avro Lancaster ASR.III
- Operator: No. 37 Squadron RAF
- Registration: SW344
- Flight origin: RAF Luqa
- Crew: 4
- Fatalities: 3
- Injuries: 1
- Survivors: 1

Ground casualties
- Ground fatalities: 1
- Ground injuries: 2

The 1952 Luqa Avro Lancaster crash was a military aviation accident that occurred in Malta on 30 December 1952 when an Avro Lancaster bomber crashed shortly after takeoff from RAF Luqa into a residential area in Luqa. Three of the four crew members on board the aircraft and a civilian on the ground were killed. The crash also caused extensive property damage. The cause of the crash was engine failure.

== Background ==
The aircraft involved in the accident was an Avro Lancaster ASR.III Search and Rescue (SAR) aircraft, serial number SW344. The aircraft had been built during World War II, and after the conflict ended it was modified for maritime search and rescue. It was delivered to No. 37 Squadron RAF in April 1951. This type of aircraft were outdated by 1952, and the squadron was planning on replacing its Lancasters with Avro Shackletons in 1953.

The aircraft was crewed by pilot John C. E. Smith, co-pilot Charles Glanville, radio operator John Crawford Logan and flight engineer Wilfred Morris. It was Glanville's first flight as a captain.

== Accident ==
On the day of the accident - Tuesday 30th December 1952 - the aircraft was to take part in a training flight. After routine checks were performed, the aircraft's engine was started up and it taxied to Runway 06 of RAF Luqa. At 11.40am, as it was making its takeoff run, the inboard port Rolls-Royce Merlin engine began to cut out intermittently, and the engine stopped working completely as the aircraft took off.

With three out of its four engines still working, Smith took over control of the aircraft and attempted to return to the airfield to make an emergency landing. However, the aircraft's speed was too slow, its altitude was too low and it was turning to starboard, and less than three minutes after takeoff it crashed into a residential area in the town of Luqa.

The aircraft hit a house and then cartwheeled down St George Street, hitting three more houses in the process. The aircraft then caught fire, with some debris falling into New Street. The aircraft's tail landed in a building site where a war-damaged house was being rebuilt, while parts of the wings and engines landed on houses, in gardens or in the street, with one of the engines landing in a garden some 200 meters away. The crash left a trail of destruction of about 275 metres (902 ft), with a number of houses being severely damaged or destroyed.

== Rescue and recovery efforts ==
The search and rescue operation was initially carried out by firefighters from RAF Luqa and the Malta police. Other rescuers arrived on the crash site soon afterwards, including teams from RAF Hal Far and RAF Ta Kali and from the Admiralty Dockyard. British paramedics and specialists as well as United States Navy personnel who had been based at Ħal Far also offered first aid to the victims.

Three of the four crew members on the Lancaster survived the initial crash but were badly injured. Two of them died in hospital within hours of the crash or the following day, leaving pilot Smith as the sole survivor. A civilian from Luqa suffered severe burns due to fire from fuel in one of the aircraft's wings which landed in her garden. She was taken to St Luke's Hospital, where she died on 1 January 1953. At least two other people suffered less serious burns and were also taken to hospital.

== Aftermath ==
After the crash, New Year celebrations at RAF Luqa were cancelled to respect the victims. Two of the crew members were buried at the Imtarfa Military Cemetery on 2 January 1953, while the remains of radio operator Crawford Logan were flown to Scotland and were buried there. The civilian who died of her injuries was buried at the Luqa parish cemetery.

The crash resulted in extensive damage to a number of buildings, with 14 properties suffering some form of damage. A court-appointed architect and Public Works Department surveyed the damage to buildings and services respectively. One family whose house was severely damaged was given alternative accommodation in a building which had been constructed to house Luqa's police station. On the day of the crash, the commanding officer at RAF Luqa sent a £25 (Note: Comparing mid-20th-century costs and prices with those of the modern period is challenging. £25 in 1952 could be equivalent to between £650 and £3357 in 2018, depending on the price comparison used.) cheque from the AOC Benevolent Fund to the Luqa parish priest as initial relief for the victims. The RAF was later willing to pay ex gratia compensation, but not as much as was requested by those who had lost property in the crash. Labour Party leader Dom Mintoff campaigned for adequate compensation to be given, and eventually the Claims Commission made a report which awarded compensation based on court experts' evaluations.

One of the first responders at the crash site, RAF Luqa fire section chief Cecil F. Harrison, was awarded the British Empire Medal on 1 September 1953 for his deeds during the rescue. He had discovered two crew members who had been thrown out of the aircraft, and he comforted them amidst burning wreckage and shouted until further help arrived.

=== Investigation ===
An official inquest was held and it found that Flight Sergeant Smith was not responsible for causing the accident.

== Legacy ==
Today, there is no memorial commemorating this accident.

== See also ==
- 1946 Rabat Vickers Wellington crash
- 1975 Żabbar Avro Vulcan crash
