= Governor-General's Flight RAAF =

Australian Air Force transport unit

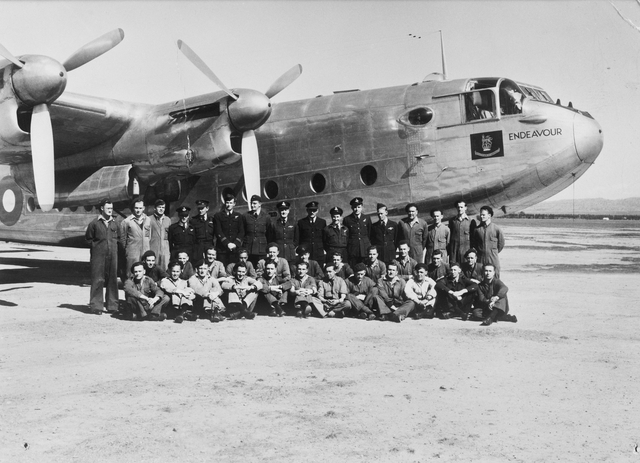
Members of the Governor-General's Flight in front of the Vice-Regal Avro York aircraft in June 1945

The Governor-General's Flight was a Royal Australian Air Force transport unit. The Governor-General's Flight was formed at RAAF Station Canberra on 4 April 1945. The unit was equipped with an Avro York named 'Endeavour', an Avro Anson and a Percival Proctor. Although the Flight initially only provided transport for the Governor-General of Australia its role was later expanded to include carrying the Prime Minister and other dignitaries. The Governor-General's Flight was disbanded on 10 July 1947 and No. 1 Communication Unit assumed responsibility for VIP transport. The Flight was re-raised on 1 July 1948 equipped with a B-24 Liberator and a Dakota. The Flight was disbanded for a second and final time on 1 October 1950 with the VIP transport role being transferred to No. 36 Squadron.

== Bibliography ==
- RAAF Historical Section (1995), Units of the Royal Australian Air Force. A Concise History. Australian Government Publishing Service, Canberra.
