= 1945 Avro York crash =

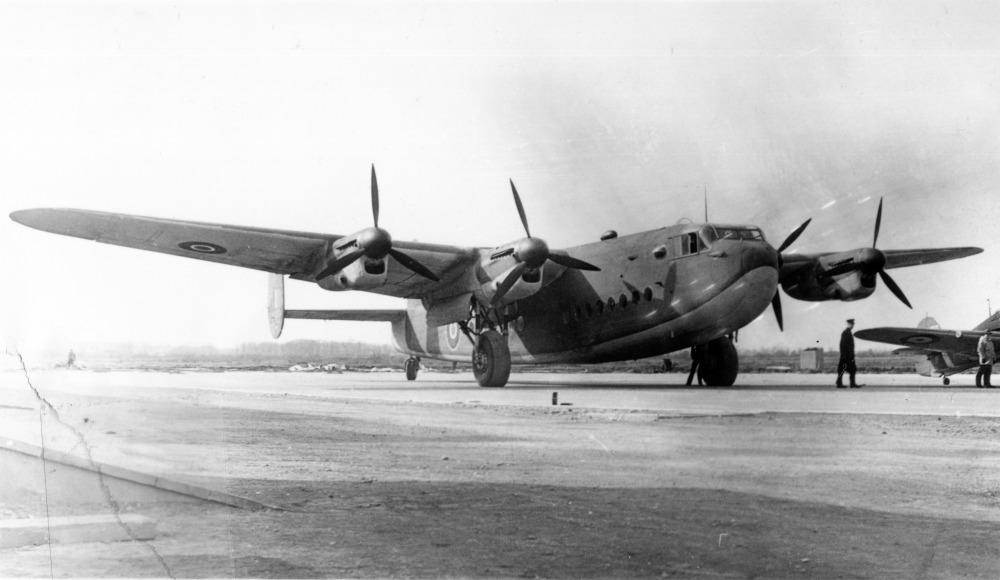
- An Avro York of the Royal Air Force, similar to the accident aircraft

Accident
- Date: 1 February 1945 at 17:15Z
- Summary: Ditched due to lack of fuel
- Site: Mediterranean Sea between Lampedusa and Malta; 35°30′0″N 12°35′0″E

Aircraft
- Aircraft type: Avro York
- Operator: No. 511 Squadron RAF
- Registration: MW116
- Flight origin: RAF Lyneham
- Stopover: RAF Luqa
- Destination: Yalta
- Passengers: 11
- Crew: 4
- Fatalities: 15
- Survivors: 0

On 1 February 1945 an Avro York carrying members of the British delegation to the Yalta Conference crashed off the Italian island of Lampedusa. During the flight to Yalta, undertaken during nighttime, the crew became unsure of their position due to a navigation radio malfunction. The aircraft ended up over Lampedusa and circled for approximately one hour as crew members attempted to verify their position. The crew eventually determined the proper course to Malta but by then the aircraft lacked the fuel to cover the distance. During an attempted ditching the Avro crashed into the sea, killing all four crew and 11 passengers. Some sources state there were four survivors.

The aircraft crew consisted of Warrant Officer William Wright, Leading Aircraftman John Chicken - wireless operator, Flight Sergeant Alfred Claude Jack Walker – flight engineer and Flying Officer Arthur Applebey – air gunner.

The results of the accident investigation were reported to Parliament by Air Minister Sir Archibald Sinclair. He stated in part, that the air crew had sufficient experience but had never previously flown together as a crew.

Six victims of the crash were buried at Imtarfa Military Cemetery in Malta. Some of the CWGC graves are damaged due to bombing of a nearby airfield in the Second World War. Wright is buried in the Medjez-el-Bab War Cemetery in Tunisia.
