= 1956 Żurrieq Avro York crash =

Air accident in 1956 over Malta

Coordinates: 35°49′22″N 14°28′04″E

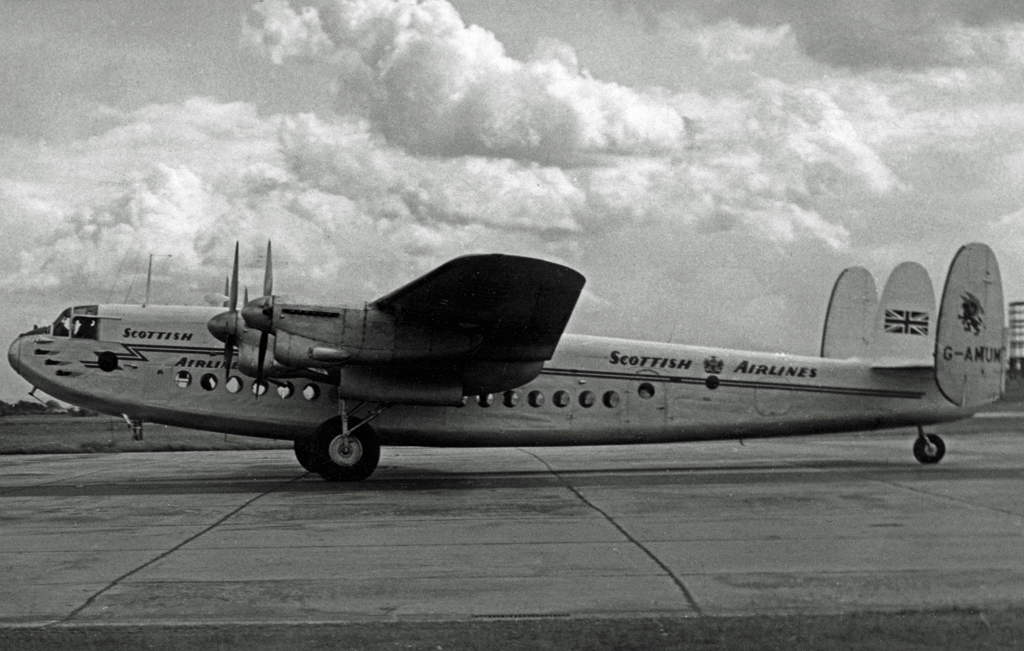
- An Avro York of Scottish Airlines similar to that involved in the accident

Accident
- Date: 18 February 1956
- Summary: Pilot error
- Site: Near Żurrieq, Malta

Aircraft
- Aircraft type: Avro York
- Operator: Scottish Airlines
- Registration: G-ANSY
- Flight origin: Luqa Airport, Malta
- Destination: London Stansted Airport, United Kingdom
- Passengers: 45
- Crew: 5
- Fatalities: 50
- Survivors: 0

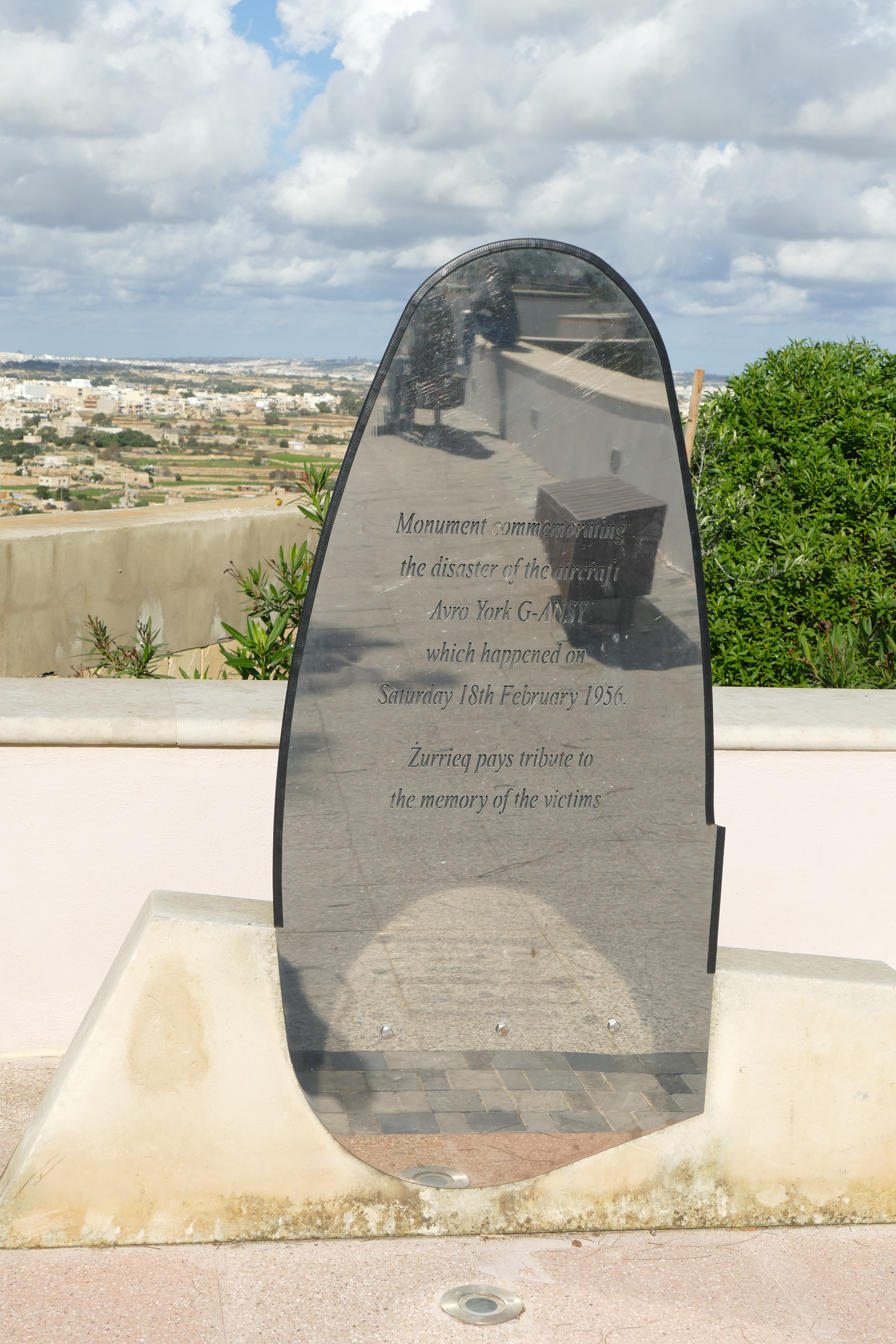
Memorial of the accident in Żurrieq

The 1956 Żurrieq Avro York crash happened on 18 February 1956 when a Scottish Airlines Avro York crashed after takeoff from Luqa Airport in Malta on a trooping flight from the Suez Canal Zone to London Stansted Airport. The disaster killed all 50 passengers and crew on board the aircraft; all passengers except one (a British Army private) were Royal Air Force personnel.

== Accident ==
The Avro York, registration G-ANSY, took off from Luqa Airport, Malta at 12:21 UTC time on a flight to London Stansted Airport with 45 passengers and five crew aboard. Shortly after becoming airborne, the boost enrichment capsule in the carburetor of the number one engine failed, and the engine caught fire. The pilots failed to feather the propeller as the aircraft slowly climbed to 700–800 feet; they then made a left turn to return to the airport. Shortly after retracting the flaps, the aircraft went into a nose-up attitude at very low speed. This resulted in a stall, which caused the aircraft to enter an unrecoverable dive. It crashed into the ground near the town of Żurrieq killing all 50 passengers and crew on board.

== Memorials ==
There is memorial at the National Memorial Arboretum, a British site of national remembrance at Alrewas, near Lichfield, Staffordshire. Another memorial is located at Il-Ġibjun Gardens in Żurrieq, Malta, close to the crash site.
