= Imtarfa Military Cemetery =

Coordinates: 35°53′26″N 14°24′35″E

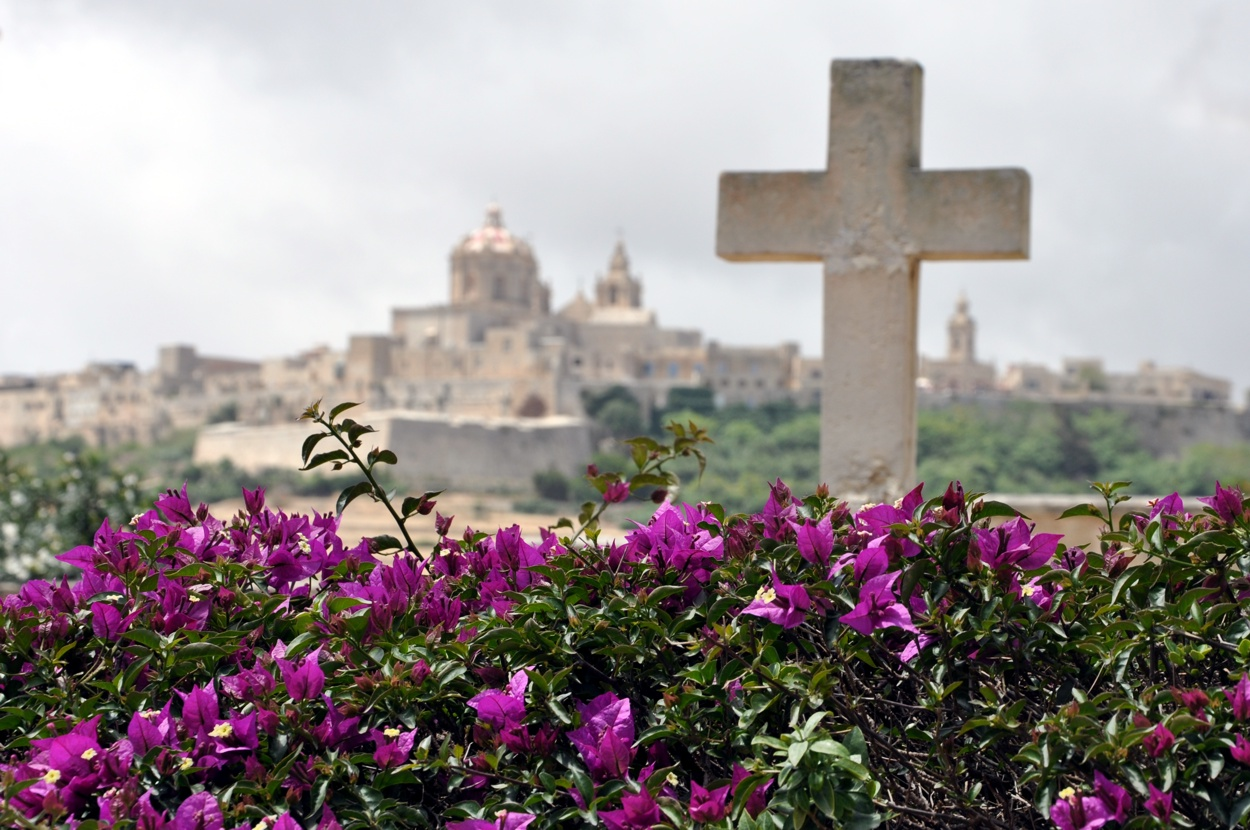
Imtarfa Military Cemetery with Mdina in the background

The Imtarfa Military Cemetery (or Ħemsija Military Cemetery) is a cemetery in Mtarfa on Triq Buqana in the Northern Region of Malta. The cemetery contains over 1,400 interments and commemorations including 254 graves of military personnel killed in the country in World War I and World War II. Many graves are marked by Commonwealth War Graves Commission (CWGC) gravestones. Some of the CWGC graves are damaged due to bombing of a nearby airfield in the Second World War.

There is one New Zealand armed forces member buried in the cemetery, and a single Dutch war grave.

There are 1,203 non war graves within the cemetery. They include pre and post WW1 and WW2 military burials and family members of military personnel. An example is Maud Elsie Holliday who died 1901 aged 6.

== Notable interments ==
- Lieutenant Colonel Hugh Alexander Pollock DSO (1888–1971) served in the Royal Scots Fusiliers in the First World War and in the Auxiliary Military Pioneer Corps in the Second World War. Pollock was the husband of the writers Enid Blyton, and Ida Pollock.
- Captain Albany Kennett Charlesworth killed with 5 others in the Avro York crash carrying members of Winston Churchill's delegation to the Yalta Conference. Alan Brooke, 1st Viscount Alanbrooke laid a wreath to Charlesworth a few days after the crash.
- Flight sergeants Charles Glanville and Wilfred Morris, who died in the 1952 Luqa Avro Lancaster crash.
