= 1975 Żabbar Avro Vulcan crash =

Crash of a British jet bomber in eastern Malta

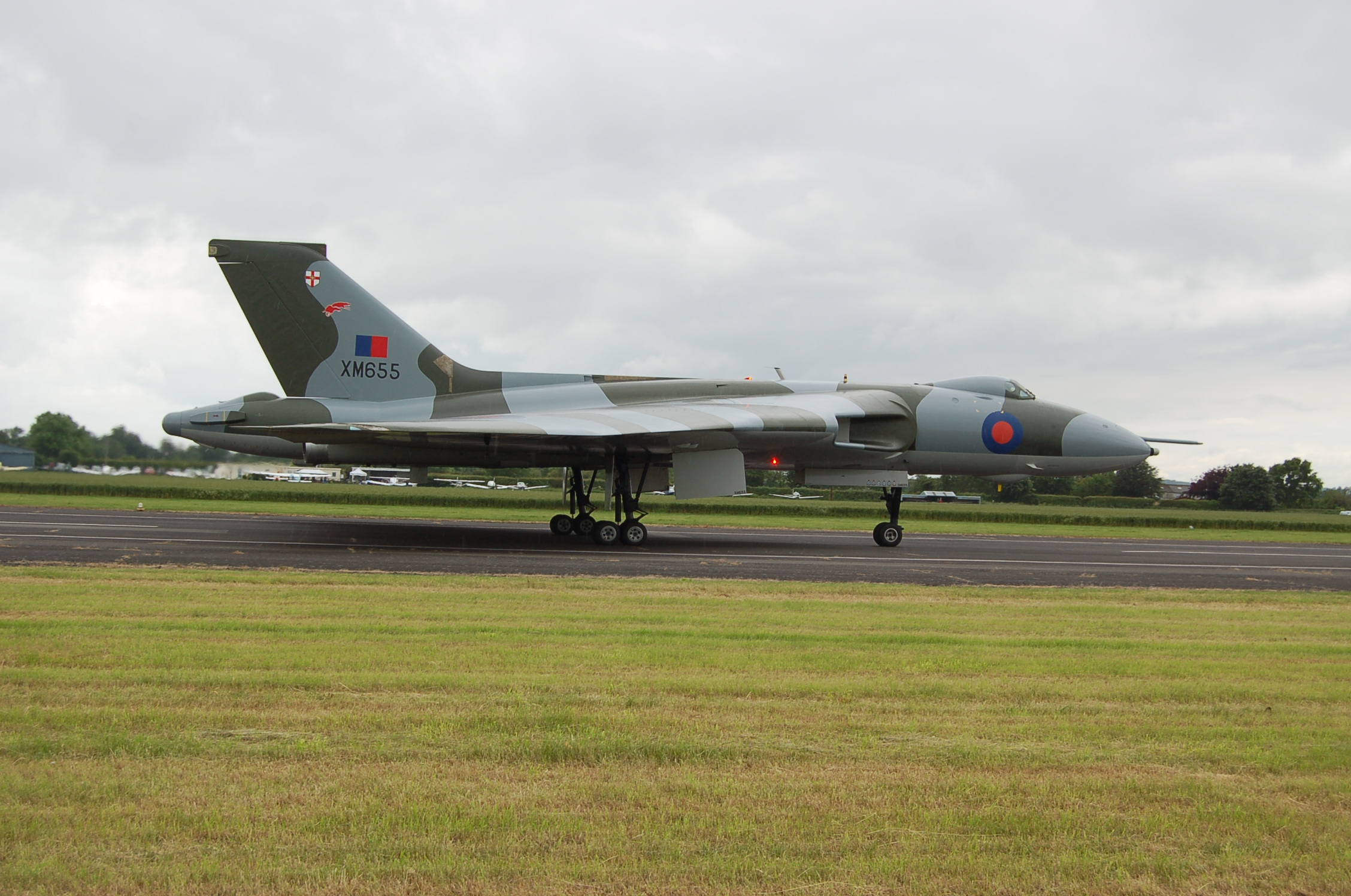
- Avro Vulcan B.2 similar to the accident aircraft

Accident
- Date: 14 October 1975
- Summary: Pilot error
- Site: Żabbar, Malta; 35°52′35.5″N 14°32′15.8″E
- Total fatalities: 6
- Total injuries: 20

Aircraft
- Aircraft type: Avro Vulcan B.2
- Operator: Royal Air Force
- Registration: XM645
- Flight origin: RAF Waddington
- Destination: RAF Luqa
- Crew: 7
- Fatalities: 5
- Survivors: 2

Ground casualties
- Ground fatalities: 1
- Ground injuries: 20

The 1975 Żabbar Avro Vulcan crash was a military aviation accident that occurred in Malta on 14 October 1975 when an Avro Vulcan B.2 bomber crashed after an aborted landing at RAF Luqa. The aircraft crashed in a residential area in Żabbar, and five crew members and one civilian on the ground were killed. The two pilots managed to eject and survived the accident. The crash caused extensive damage to many buildings in Żabbar.

An investigation of the accident cited pilot error as the primary cause.

== Background ==
XM645 was an Avro Vulcan B.2 bomber which had been completed in March 1964.

On 14 October 1975, the aircraft was flying from RAF Waddington in England to RAF Luqa in Malta. The pilot was Flight Lieutenant G. R. Alcock, and the co-pilot was Flying Officer E. G. Alexander, and five other crew members were also on board. Alcock allowed Alexander to carry out the final approach, but the latter was not adequately briefed with the problems that arose when landing on a short, sloping runway like that at Luqa.

== Accident ==
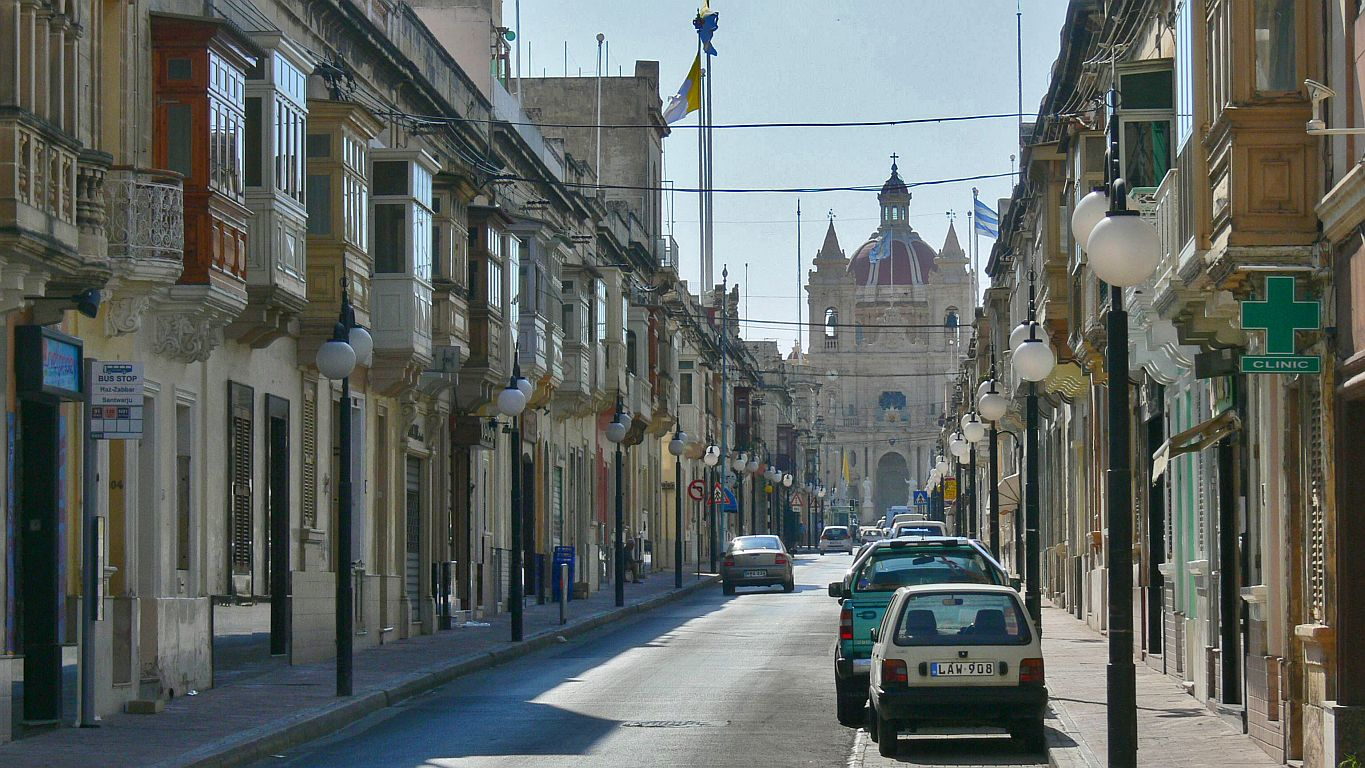
Sanctuary Street in Żabbar, where the debris landed

With Alexander piloting the aircraft, it made a hard landing at Luqa and undershot the runway, shearing off its undercarriage. According to an eyewitness, the aircraft then became airborne and touched down again about 600 feet (180 m) from where it first landed. By this point, captain Alcock had taken over control of the aircraft, and he decided to climb again and attempt another landing.

Fire broke out in the starboard wing as a fuel tank had been pierced by the initial impact. Before the aircraft managed to return to the airport, the crew realised that it was too late and the pilot and co-pilot ejected. The aircraft then exploded in mid-air, killing the remaining five crew members on board, who did not have time to escape the aircraft by bailing out through a crew door.

Debris including the aircraft's fuel tanks landed in the main street of Żabbar and exploded upon impact. Other parts of the aircraft fell on top of the school and other areas of the town. There was extensive property damage, with over 100 houses and shops and some cars being damaged. A woman (Vincenza Zammit) who was walking in the street was killed, while about 20 other people on the ground were injured, some seriously.

Firefighters took hours to put out the fires caused by the crash.

== Aftermath ==
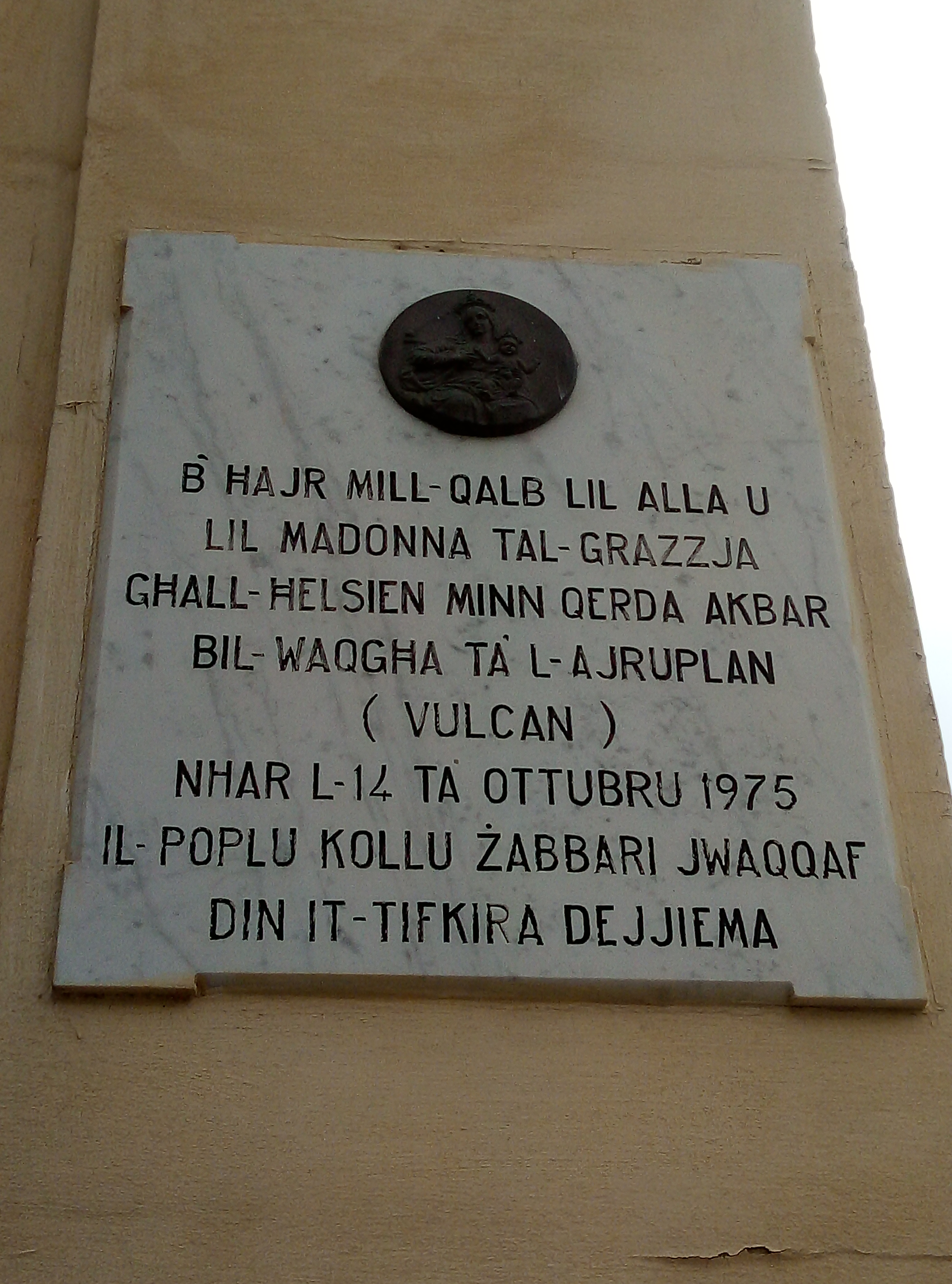
Plaque in Żabbar with a Maltese inscription reading "To thank God and Our Lady of Graces for the deliverance from greater destruction in the plane crash (Vulcan) on 14 October 1975, the people of Żabbar set up this lasting memorial."

An inquiry was held after the crash, and it concluded that it was "an avoidable accident in which a serviceable aircraft was flown into the ground killing all rear crew members." The report criticized captain Alcock for allowing co-pilot Alexander to carry out the final approach without adequately briefing him, and found his handling of the aircraft as negligent.

One of the houses which was seriously damaged was rebuilt at the expense of the RAF, and it was later renamed Vulcan.

Since the aircraft crashed in a residential area and caused severe damage, the human casualties on the ground could have been much worse. Some interpreted this as a miracle. In fact, a few days after the crash, on 25 October 1975 a procession with the stature of Our Lady of Graces was carried out to "thank God and His Mother for saving the locality from what could have been a much worse disaster."

The Żabbar Sanctuary Museum contains a small exhibition relating to the accident.

== See also ==
- 1946 Rabat Vickers Wellington crash
- 1952 Luqa Avro Lancaster crash
