= 1946 Rabat Vickers Wellington crash =

Military aviation disaster in British Malta

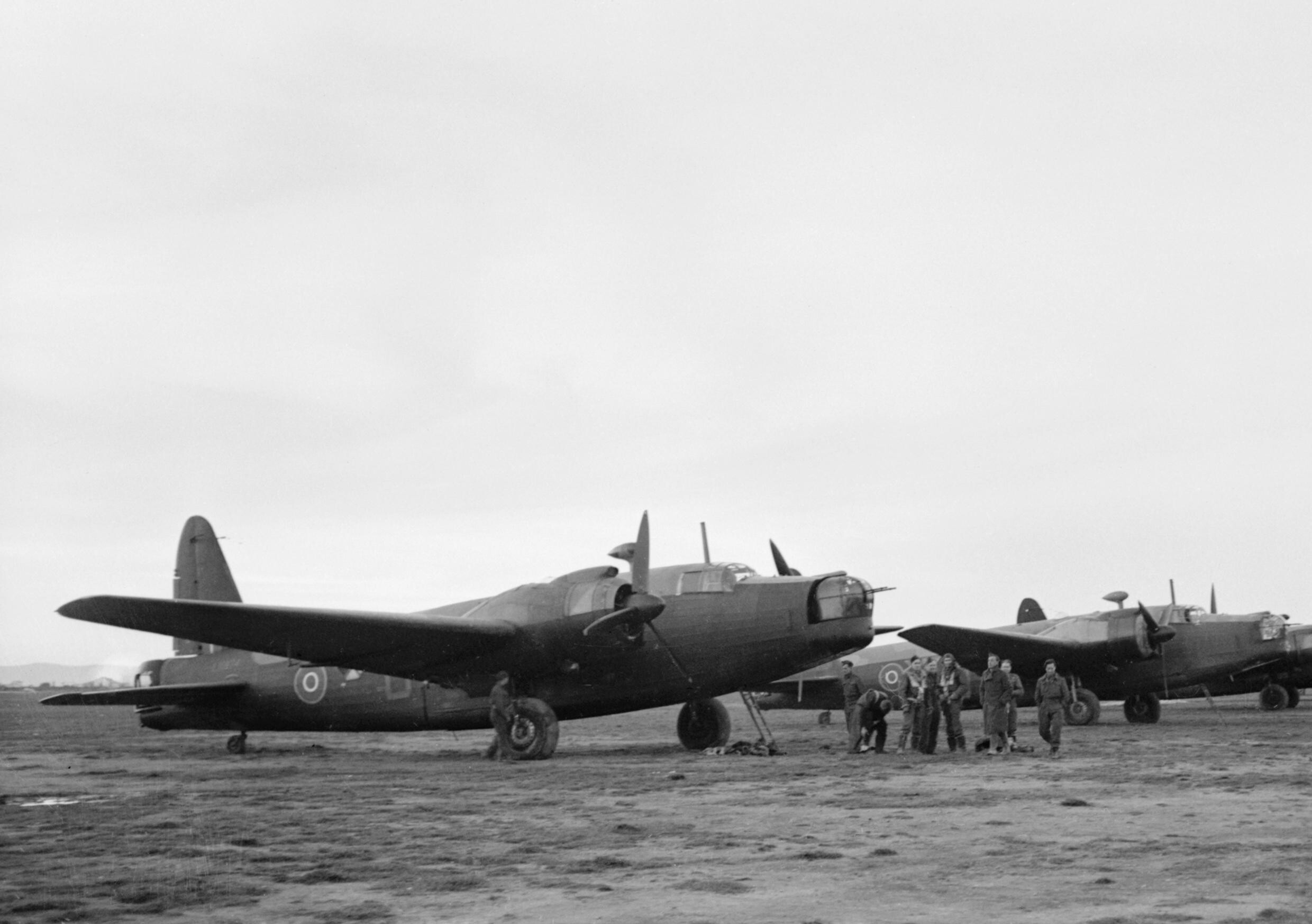
- Vickers Wellington similar to the accident aircraft

Accident
- Date: 5 April 1946
- Summary: Crashed, possibly following crew incapacitation due to leakage of hydraulic fluid
- Site: Rabat, Crown Colony of Malta; 35°52′49.9″N 14°23′59.8″E
- Total fatalities: 20
- Total injuries: Several

Aircraft
- Aircraft type: Vickers Wellington
- Operator: 765 Naval Air Squadron
- Registration: HE274
- Flight origin: RAF Hal Far
- Destination: RAF Hal Far
- Crew: 4
- Fatalities: 4
- Survivors: 0

Ground casualties
- Ground fatalities: 16
- Ground injuries: Several

The 1946 Rabat Vickers Wellington crash was a military aviation accident that occurred in Malta on 5 April 1946 when a Vickers Wellington bomber crashed during a training exercise in a residential area in Rabat. All four crew members on board the aircraft and 16 civilians on the ground were killed. The crash also caused extensive property damage. The exact cause was never conclusively determined, but a magisterial inquiry suggested that leakage of hydraulic fluid leading to crew incapacitation could be a probable cause.

== Background ==
The aircraft involved in the accident was a Vickers 440 Wellington B Mark X bomber with the registration HE274. The aircraft formed part of 765 Naval Air Squadron of the Fleet Air Arm of the Royal Navy, and it was the last Wellington in service with the Fleet Air Arm.

== Accident ==
The Wellington took off from RAF Hal Far at 10.50am, after the crew had inspected the aircraft and declared it to be airworthy. The aircraft was taking part in a training exercise with a Supermarine Spitfire from No. 73 Squadron RAF, in which the Spitfire performed dummy attacks on the Wellington which was to take evasive action.

The two aircraft rendezvoused over Ħal Far at about 11.00am and established radio contact, before beginning the exercise by flying northwest towards Gozo. The Spitfire performed three attacks from above or at the same level as the Wellington, and then began its fourth attack from below. At this point, the Wellington was at a height of 4,000–5,000 feet (1,200–1,500 m), and it turned to port and descended towards the east at an angle of 20°, continuing until it crashed into a residential area of Rabat and exploded at about 11.15am.

All four crew members on board the aircraft died in the crash. On the ground, 16 residents were killed and several others were injured. Five children and a baby were among the dead.

== Fatalities ==
This a full list of all the people killed in this accident.

Aircraft crew:

- Robert Owen-Davies, 25 years old
- Reginald K.W. Hathorn, 23
- John Donn Morgan, 20
- Bernard Arthur Page, 23

Ground fatalities:

- Ġużeppi Bugeja, 61 years old
- Giovanna Bugeja, 59
- Marija Bugeja, 27
- Loreta Maranci, 34
- Vincenza Maranci, 2,
- Ġużeppi Maranci, 11 months
- P.C Pietru Mifsud, 29
- Marija MIfsud, 25
- Filippa Said, 75
- Giovanni Ciantar, 59
- Felicita Vella née Ciantar, 35
- Karmenu Vella, 14
- Vincent Vella, 1
- Sunta Galea, 27
- Marija Galea, 3
- Maddalena, 3 months

== Rescue and recovery efforts ==
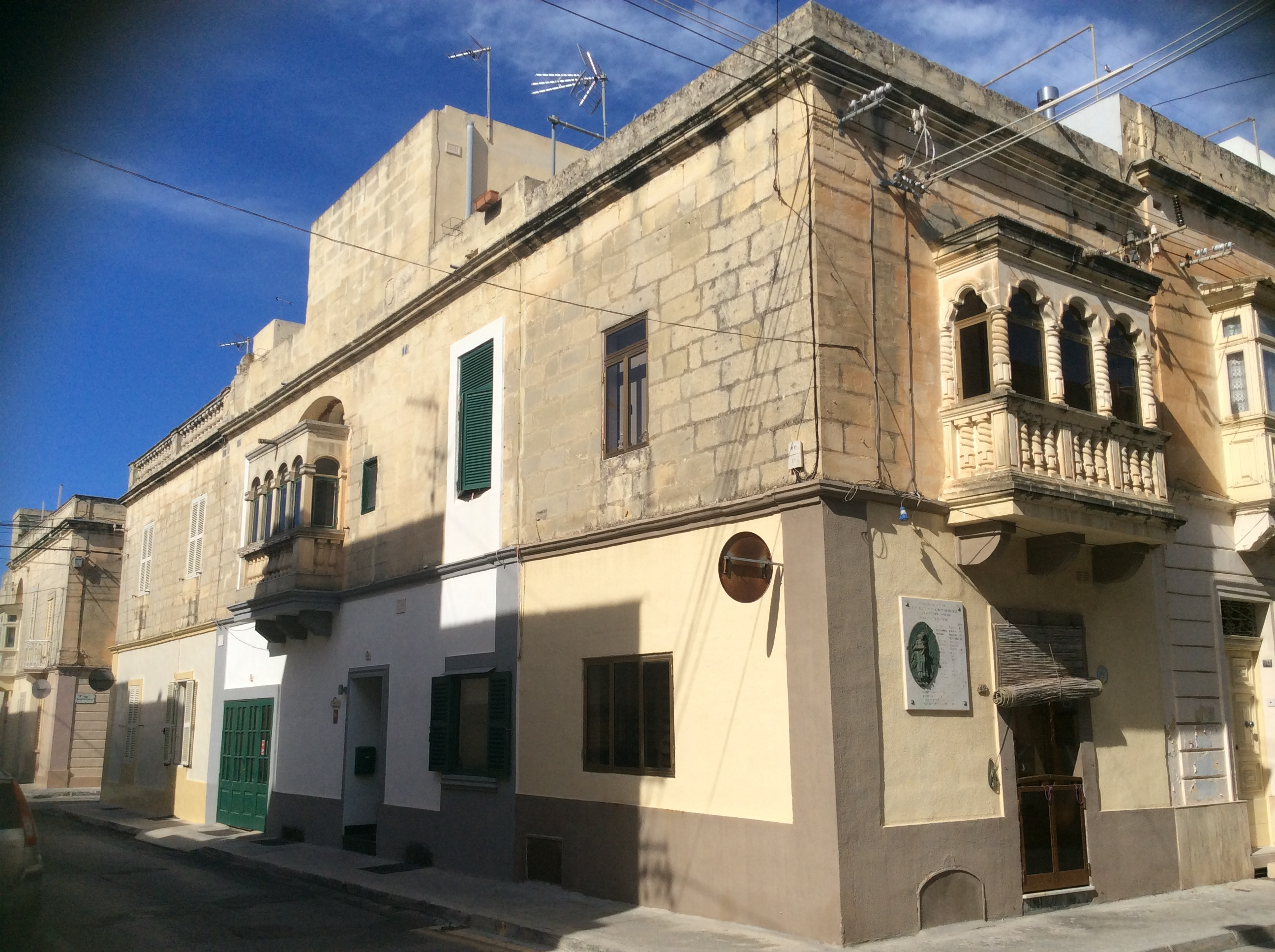
Site of the crash as seen in 2017

The search and rescue operation was undertaken by British soldiers, naval ratings, RAF personnel, demolition and clearance rescue squads, medical officers, paramedics, police and firefighters. Fire engines and fire-fighting equipment was sent to the area from the Malta Dockyard and RAF Ta' Qali, while the navy supplied generators allowing the rescue efforts to continue at night.

Civilians also took part in searching for survivors, and police had to cordon off the crash site to prevent too many people from entering the area. The area was unsafe for the rescuers due to the unstable partially collapsed buildings and the spread of fire, and a policeman and a demolition crew member were injured by falling masonry. Clergymen also helped out in the recovery of bodies, and performed last rites to the victims.

At least 10 people were rescued alive from the rubble, and were taken to a hospital in Ħamrun.

== Aftermath ==
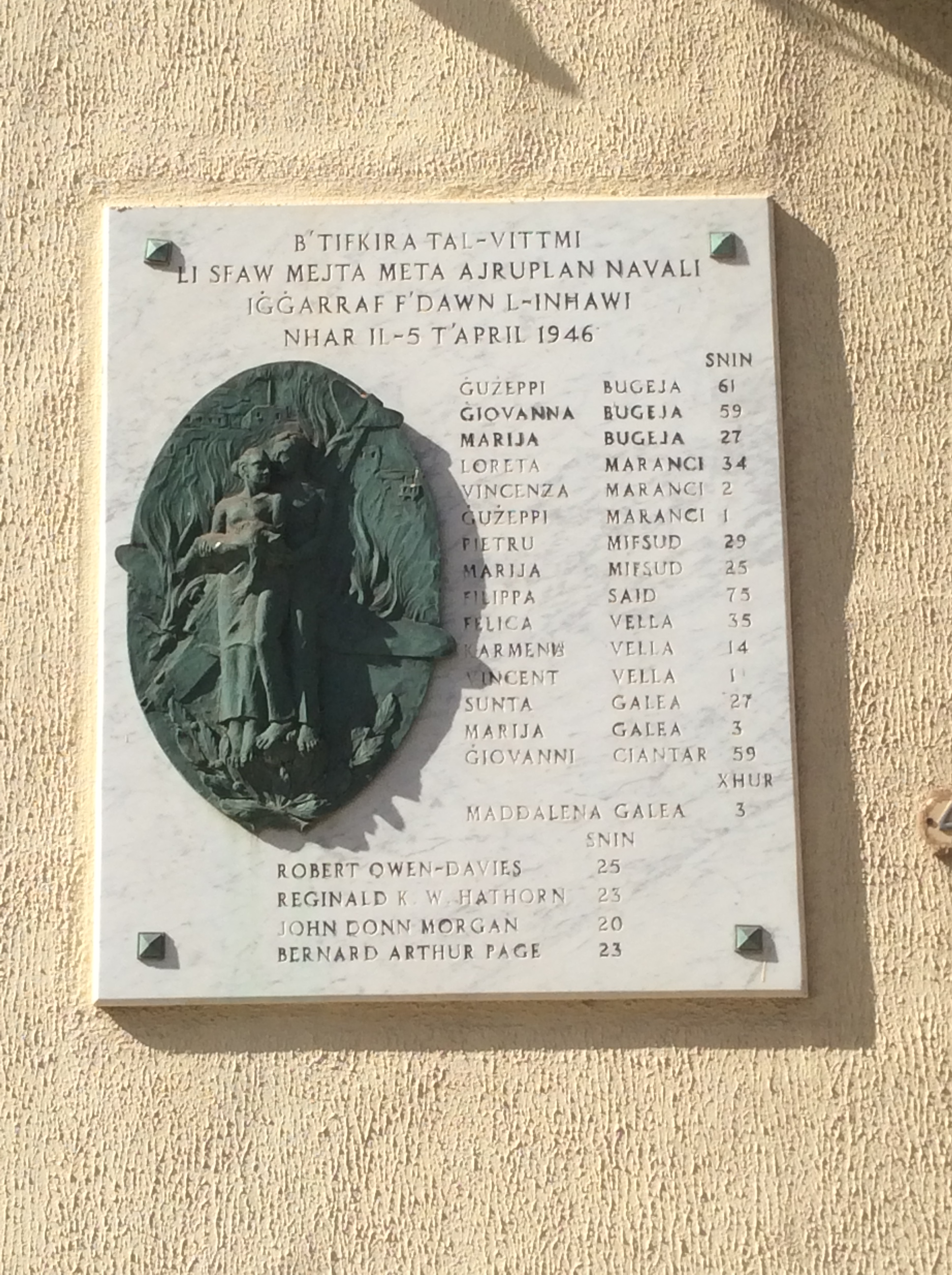
Plaque commemorating the victims of the disaster

The crash of the Wellington was the first air disaster to occur in Malta after the end of World War II. The crash site was visited by Lieutenant-Governor David Campbell, Archbishop Mikiel Gonzi, Vice-Admiral Frederick Dalrymple-Hamilton and the Commissioner of Police. Dalrymple-Hamilton offered condolences to the victims and their families, and the National Assembly observed a minute of silence on the recommendation of secretary R. G. Miller.

The crash resulted in extensive property damage which totaled up to about £11,000. (Note: Comparing mid-20th-century costs and prices with those of the modern period is challenging. £11,000 in 1946 could be equivalent to between £403,000 and £2.38 million in 2018, depending on the price comparison used.) 18 houses were destroyed or had to be evacuated after suffering severe damage, leaving 72 families homeless. These people were provided with new accommodation as well as clothes, food and other necessities after the crash.

=== Investigation ===
Representatives from the Surveyor of the Lands Department (H.M. Dockyard) inspected the crash site on the day after the disaster. A magisterial inquiry was conducted by Magistrate Albert Camilleri.

There were claims that smoke was seen coming from the aircraft before it crashed, but this contradicts the inquiry report which found no evidence of fire before the crash. There were also claims that the crew had attempted to land in fields below Tal-Virtù, but no distress calls were ever received from the aircraft.

The inquiry was unable to determine the exact cause of the crash, but leakage of hydraulic fluid was considered to be a probable cause. This could have resulted in fumes which rendered the crew unconscious, leaving them unable to control the aircraft.

== See also ==
- 1952 Luqa Avro Lancaster crash
- 1975 Żabbar Avro Vulcan crash
