= Scottish Airlines =

Scottish airline, 1945–1960

Scottish Airlines and Scottish Air Lines (Prestwick) Ltd.
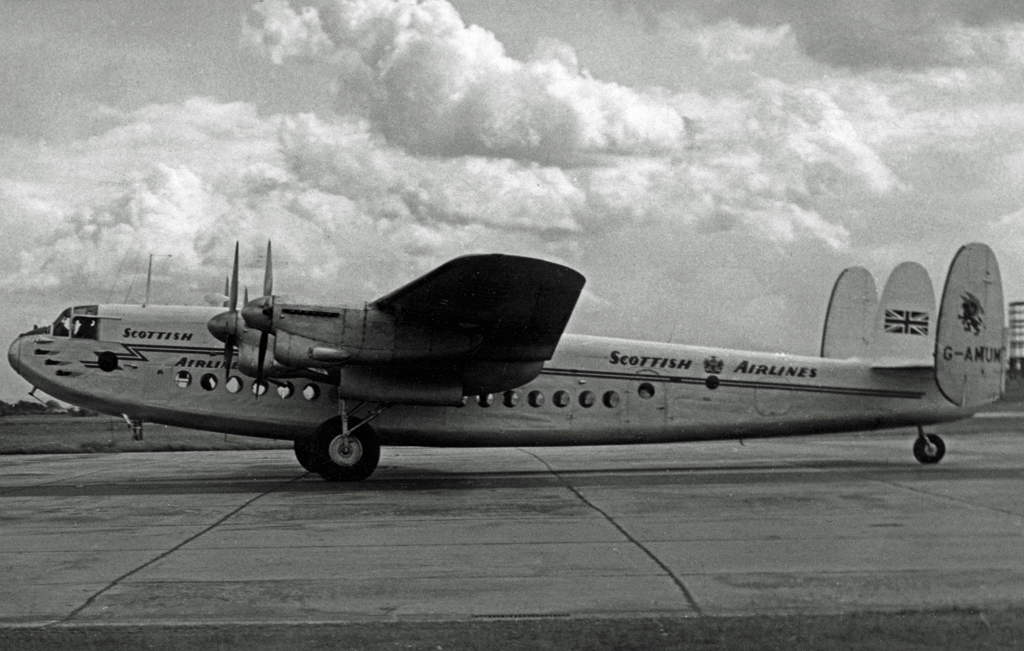
- Avro 685 York in 1953
- Founded: January 1946
- Commenced operations: January 1946
- Ceased operations: November 1960
- Hubs: Prestwick Airport; Stansted Airport
- Fleet size: 3 (1 Douglas DC-3/C-47 Dakota, 2 Scottish Aviation Twin Pioneer (as of January 1959)
- Destinations: worldwide
- Parent company: Scottish Aviation Ltd.
- Headquarters: Prestwick Airport
- Key people: I.C. Grant, D. McConnell, W.A. Wilkinson, Alastair Cormack, John Fussey, Group Capt.McIntyre.

Scottish Airlines was formed in January 1946 as a division of Scottish Aviation Limited. It immediately commenced worldwide passenger and cargo charter flights from Prestwick and Stansted. It also participated in the Berlin Airlift, became a trooping carrier for the British Armed Forces, and carried out contract flights on behalf of Air France, British European Airways (BEA), SABENA, Iceland Airways and KLM.

Scottish Airlines also flew scheduled flights to Faroe between July and October 1947.

Scottish Airlines also operated scheduled services in its own right between Prestwick Airport in Scotland and Ronaldsway Airport on the Isle of Man. The airline ceased operations in late 1960. Its aircraft and routes were taken over by Dan-Air in early 1961.

== History ==
=== The 1940s ===
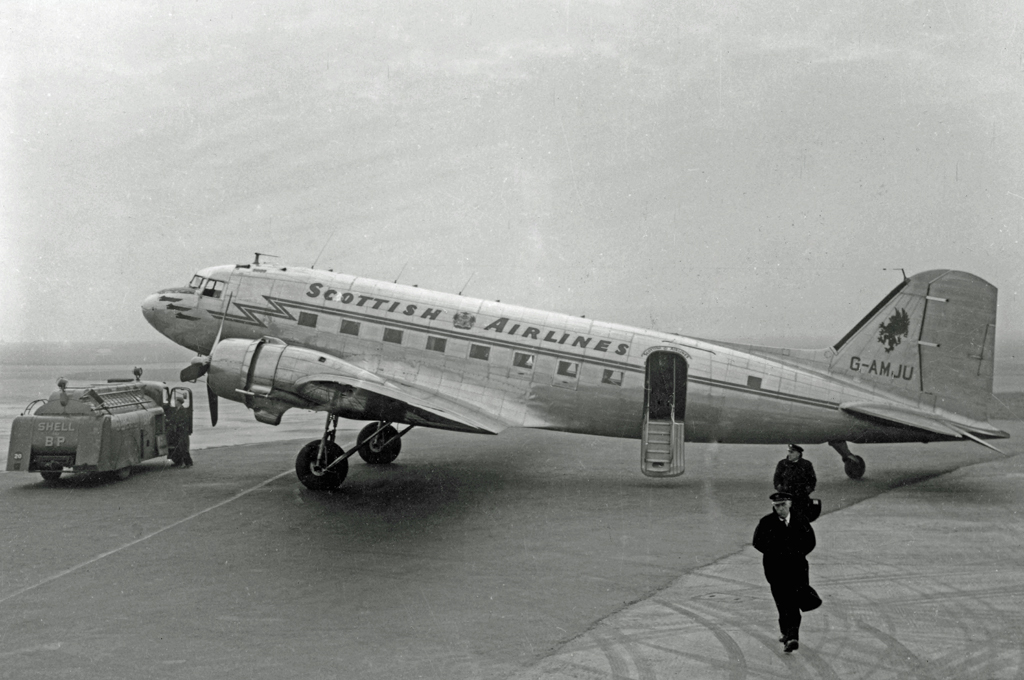
Douglas DC-3 at Manchester Airport in 1952 when operating the Prestwick-Northolt schedule

Scottish Airlines was an early post-World War II private, independent (Note: independent from government-owned corporations) British airline, legally a division of Scottish Aviation Limited. It was founded in January 1946 and began flying at the end of the month. The first scheduled flights began in May. In 1947 Scottish Airlines operated a fleet of 20 aircraft, which flew 1,480,154 miles (mi) (2,382,077 kilometres (km)). This was more than twice the previous year's total of 632,957 mi (1,018,646 km). The airline carried 43,702 passengers during 1947 on a variety of scheduled and non-scheduled services, both under contract to other airlines as well as in its own right. Contract flights included charter flights between Prestwick and Iceland on behalf of Iceland Airways and scheduled services linking Prestwick with Belfast and London, Glasgow with Belfast and London, and Aberdeen with London under contract to BEA, as well as Prestwick with Paris under contract to Air France, Prestwick with Amsterdam under contract to KLM, and Prestwick and Manchester with Brussels under contract to SABENA. Contract flights for BEA terminated in July 1947 and those for Air France and KLM a short while later. The Icelandic and Belgian services continued into 1948. Scottish Airlines operated worldwide charter flights in its own right, including to destinations all over Europe, Africa, the Middle East, India, Canada and the United States. A scheduled service from Prestwick to Reyjavik (not Keflavik) and on to Copenhagen (Kastrup) then back to Prestwick was also flown. Scottish Airlines operated B24 Liberators from Northolt to Athens on a scheduled service on behalf of Hellenic Airlines in 1947-8.

On 7 May 1948 a Scottish airlines Liberator departed Prestwick on a cargo charter flight to Calcutta via Rome, Cyprus, Basra and Karachi. On board was a ship's propeller shaft weighing 6 tons 7 cwt (6.5 tonnes) and measuring 19 feet (ft) 6 inches (5.9 m), which was urgently required for SS Clan Angus. At the time, this was believed to be one of the heaviest single pieces of machinery carried by a British commercial aircraft. One of Scottish Airlines' first overseas engagements was its participation in the 1948-49 Berlin Airlift. One Liberator was used from 4 August 1948 until 14 August 1948, operating between Wunstorf and RAF Gatow. And two Liberators from 19 February 1949 until 12 July 1949 between RAF Schleswigland and RAF Gatow in Berlin. Flights with the Dakota have also been recorded. A total of 497 flights, carrying 458.2 tonnes of freight and 2716.5 tonnes of fuel have been carried in the Berlin Airlift by Scottish Airlines.

=== The 1950s and a registered airline ===
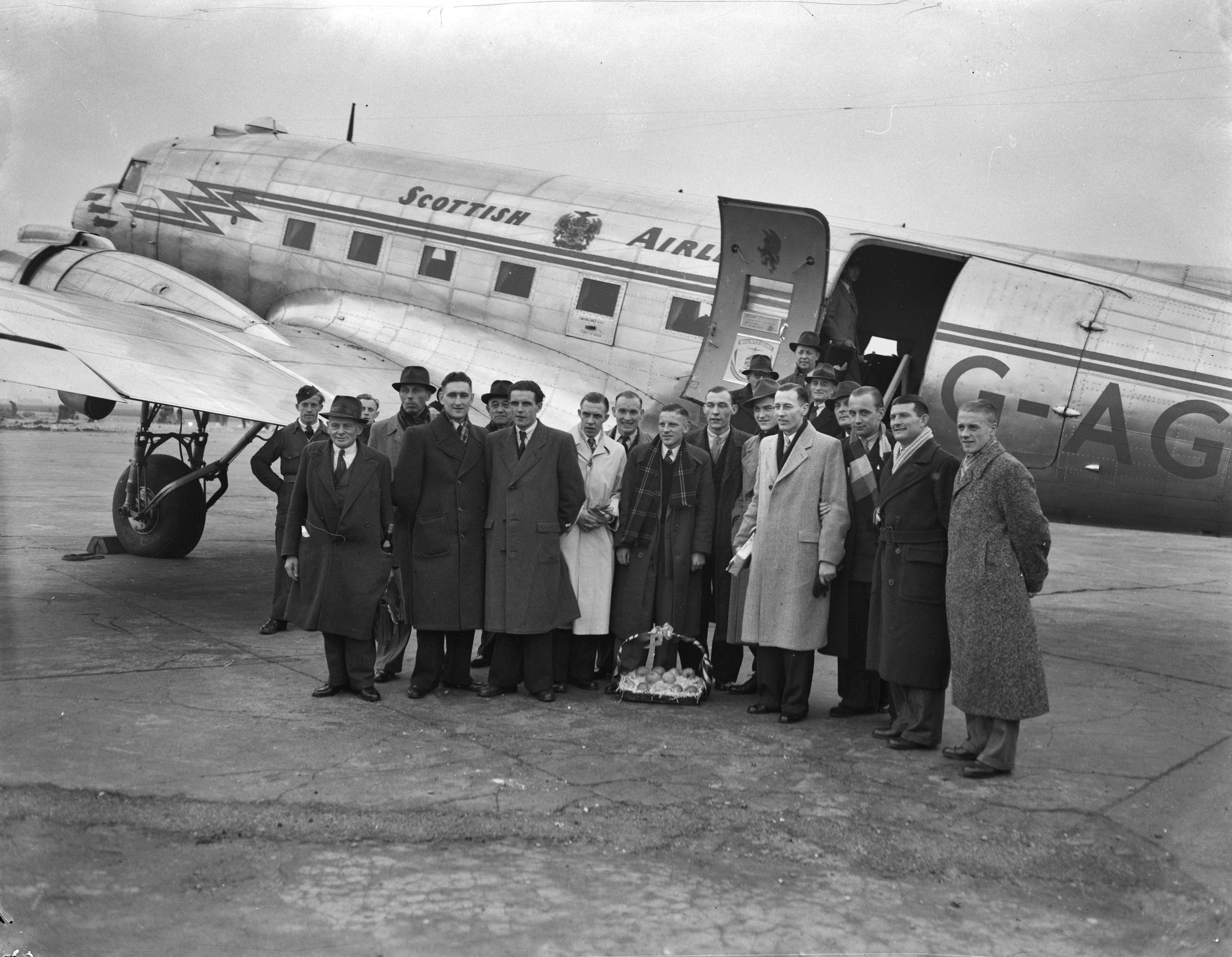
Departure of the Dutch National Team to England in a Douglas DC-3

In September 1951 the division was duly registered Scottish Air Lines (Prestwick) Ltd. and became a legal airline. During 1951-52 a scheduled service was operated on weekdays with Dakotas, linking Prestwick with RAF Burtonwood near Warrington (for Manchester and Liverpool) and on to RAF Northolt (for London). From late-1952 the service transited RAF Ringway for (Manchester) instead of Burtonwood. It ceased in early 1953. Trooping flights and seasonal scheduled services between Prestwick and the Isle of Man commenced during the early 1950s.

A series of accidents involving five of the company's Avro Yorks — two at RAF Luqa in Malta and three at Stansted — called the airline's safety record into question, contributing to the Air Ministry's decision to stop using the air carrier for trooping flights. As the firm had depended on trooping for most of its revenue and profit, the loss of these contracts hastened its demise.

Still involved in the scheduled business, Scottish Airlines succeeded in converting its Associate Agreement for Isle of Man flights into a full scheduled licence late in 1952, though from February 1953, the London route was discontinued in the face of disappointing loads. Together with its ad-hoc work and government charter programmes, the pattern of operations continued unchanged until the end of the decade when all scheduled routes were halted in September 196, and all flying operations in the following November. Dan-Air's purchase of Scottish Airlines assets from Scottish Aviation Ltd. in early-1961 enlarged the former's scheduled operations.

== Fleet ==
In April 1960 the fleet of Scottish Airlines comprised only three aircraft.

Aircraft type	Total
Douglas DC-3	1
Scottish Aviation Twin Pioneer	2
Total	3

== Accidents and incidents ==
There are eight recorded accidents or incidents involving aircraft owned and/or operated by Scottish Airlines, five of which involved fatalities.

1. 13 October 1948 - Consolidated Liberator II registered G-AHZP crashed while landing at Speke airport. No fatalities.
2. 23 July 1949 - De Havilland DH.89A G-AKSF destroyed by fire at Prestiwick airport.
3. 13 April 1954 - Avro York G-AMUM heavily damaged while landing at Luqa airport (Malta).
4. 22 September 1954 - Avro York G-ANRC caught fire during take-off from Stansted airport and crashed in flames. No fatalities.
5. 18 February 1956 - The worst fatal accident occurred when an Avro 685 York C.1 (registered G-ANSY) crashed after taking off from Luqa airport, Malta, killing all 50 occupants (45 service personnel and five crew). Following takeoff the boost enrichment capsule in the carburettor of the no. 1 engine failed shortly after the aircraft had become airborne. This set the no. 1 engine on fire. Accident investigators presumed that this engine stopped producing power after only 30 seconds of flight. The flightdeck crew did not feather the engine's propeller as the aircraft was still slowly climbing to 700–800 feet above sea level, with a "crabbing" or "yawing" motion to the left. The aircraft stalled and dove to the ground while still in a nose-up attitude at very low flying speed shortly after retracting the flaps. Although the failure of the aircraft's no. 1 engine was established as the accident's probable cause, loss of speed and consequent loss of control through an error of judgement of the pilot in command were considered important contributory factors.
6. 30 April 1956 - Avro York registered G-AMUL crashed while taking-off from Stansted airport. The aircraft (registered G-AMUL) was carrying Royal Air Force (RAF) personnel and their families. During the takeoff run from the long temporary runway (which was composed of the former taxiway with the addition of a strip on either side due to the reconstruction of the airport's main runway) the aircraft swung violently to the right 300 300 yd (270 m) down that runway. The captain decided to abort the takeoff and closed the throttles. The first officer pulled back the no. 1 throttle, which was not fully closed. Despite the flightdeck crew's action, the aircraft ran off the side of the runway at a speed of about 45 knots (kn) (52 miles per hour / 84 kilometres per hour). The aircraft's undercarriage collapsed when it crossed a drain 25 ft (7.6 m) from the side of the runway. Accident investigators established "an over-correction of the portward course of the aircraft possibly accompanied by some application of the starboard brake caused the aircraft to swing starboard off the runway and to encounter the French drain with the resulting failure of the undercarriage" as the probable cause. The pilot's over-correction was interpreted as "a grave error of judgement and skill rather than a wrongful act or default", regardless of whether this was accompanied by an application of the aircraft's starboard brake.
7. 23 December 1957 - Avro York registered G-AMUN crashed while approaching Stansted Airport airport. It was the third-worst fatal accident in Scottish Airlines' history, killing all four crew members. The aircraft, on a cargo flight, had already carried out two missed approaches. On the third approach it collided with a tree three-quarters of a mile (1.21 km) short of the runway. This resulted in the aircraft bursting into flames. Accident investigators established an error on the part of the captain, which resulted in an approach below the critical height without sufficient visual reference to the ground while he attempted to land, as the probable cause.
8. 10 March 1960 - Scottish Aviation Twin Pioneer 3 (registered G-ANTP) carrying three crew members on a demonstration flight from the Indian Air Force (IAF) base at Jorhat Rowriah Airport, Assam, in northeast India. Shortly after takeoff from Rowriah Airport on an evaluation flight, the aircraft's no. 1 engine ran down at a height of 30 to 40 ft (9.1 to 12.2 m). The aircraft continued to climb to 100 ft (30 m), when it yawed left and lost height. This resulted in the aircraft striking the ground and bursting into flames on impact, killing all three occupants. Investigators attributed the accident to "an attempt to climb the aircraft on [a] single engine with full flaps and slats during [the] takeoff when its all-up weight was near its maximum limit". This resulted in the aircraft losing its forward speed, stalling and crashing due to an inadequate climb performance in such configuration under the conditions it was operating.

== See also ==
- List of defunct airlines of the United Kingdom

== Notes and citations ==
Notes

Citations

== Sources ==
- "Flight International". Flight International - Marketing Stories. Sutton, UK: Reed Business Information. ISSN 0015-3710. (various backdated issues relating to Scottish Airlines, 1946–1961)
- Simons, Graham M. (1993). The Spirit of Dan-Air. Peterborough, UK: GMS Enterprises. ISBN 1-870384-20-2.
- Aviation News - UK and Irish airlines since 1945 (Part 34 [Dan-Air Services], Vol. 64, No. 12, December 2002. St. Leonards on Sea, UK: HPC Publishing. (Aviation News online)
- Pearcy, Berlin Airlift (Airlife, Shrewsbury* Pearcy, Berlin Airlift, 1997) ISBN 1-85310-845-6
