= Avro York =

1942 transport aircraft family by Avro

Type 685 York
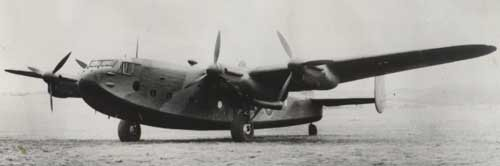
- LV633 Ascalon, Churchill's personal aircraft

General information
- Type: Transport
- Manufacturer: Avro
- Designer: Roy Chadwick
- Status: Two examples on display
- Primary users: Royal Air Force BOAC; British South American Airways; Skyways Ltd
- Number built: 258 (including 4 prototypes)

History
- Manufactured: 1943–1948
- Introduction date: 1944
- First flight: 5 July 1942
- Retired: 1964
- Developed from: Avro Lancaster

The Avro York was a British transport aircraft developed by Avro during the Second World War. The design was derived from the Avro Lancaster heavy bomber, several sections of the York and Lancaster being identical. Due to the importance of Lancaster production, York output proceeded slowly until 1944, after which a higher priority was placed upon transport aircraft.

The York saw service in military and civilian roles with various operators between 1943 and 1964. In civilian service, British South American Airways (BSAA) and British Overseas Airways Corporation (BOAC) were the largest users of the type. In military service, large numbers of Yorks were used for air-supply missions during the Berlin Blockade 1948–49. A number of the type were used as air transports of heads of state and government; VIPs who flew on Yorks included British Prime Minister Winston Churchill, French General Charles de Gaulle, Governor-General of India Lord Mountbatten and South African Prime Minister Jan Smuts.

== Development ==
=== Origins ===
During 1941, Avro elected to begin development of a new civil-orientated transport aircraft. In the midst of an uncertain stage of the Second World War, Britain's aircraft industry was preoccupied by urgent wartime demands, not only to produce military aircraft, but to design increasingly capable models as well. The company's decision to embark on this venture was considered to be ambitious, especially as the development project operated with no official backing early on. The project may well have been influenced by a shortage of transport aircraft, as well as by the formation of the British Overseas Airways Corporation (BOAC), in 1940, to run all of the nation's overseas civil air routes. However, according to aviation author Donald Hannah, there was little incentive and few materials available for the construction of transport aircraft, it was impossible to predict when the war would end and, thus, when large-scale demand for civil aircraft would return.

Roy Chadwick, Avro's chief designer, had foreseen a need for a transport aircraft that was powered by four engines and would be capable of flying for long distances. The design, which was designated as the Type 685, had its origins in the company's then-newly developed four-engined bomber, the Avro Lancaster, which had made its first flight only earlier that year. The Type 685 paired various elements of the Lancaster, such as its wings, tail assembly and undercarriage and Rolls-Royce Merlin engines, with a new square-section fuselage that provided double the internal capacity of the Lancaster. The two aircraft also substantially differed in external appearance.

In February 1942, Chadwick submitted his drawings to Avro's experimental department. Within five months, the company refined the design and had quickly assembled an initial prototype at Chadderton, in June, then transferred it to Ringway. On 5 July 1942, the York prototype, LV626, conducted its maiden flight from Ringway Airport, Manchester. It had initially been fitted with the twin fins and rudders of the Lancaster but the increased fuselage side area forward of the wing compared to the Lancaster necessitated fitting a third central fin to retain adequate control and directional stability; the third fin was fitted as standard on subsequent production aircraft. Flight trials of LV626 were quickly transferred to RAF Boscombe Down. In response to the prototype's favourable performance during trials, the Air Ministry issued an order for three more prototypes of various configurations to be built along with an initial production batch under Specification C.1/42, part of Operational Requirement OR.113 for a new transport aircraft.

The prototypes were used to test various adaptions and potential roles for the aircraft. LV626, the first prototype, was rebuilt to the C.II standard, the principal modification of which was the installation of Bristol Hercules VI radial engines in place of the Merlins; it was later decided to standardise on the Merlin engine, leaving this as the sole Hercules-powered York. The fourth prototype, LV639, was furnished as a paratroop transport, complete with ventral dropping doors. However, flight testing found that the York was unsuited to this role, due to the slipstream wash drawing the parachutes towards the fixed tailwheel, posing an entanglement risk.

=== Production ===
Production of the York proved difficult to speed up, due to shortages of key materials. Moreover, Avro was also obliged to place a high priority on the manufacturing and refinement of the Lancaster. Officials had also judged that there was no requirement for large numbers of Yorks at that time. By the end of 1943, only the four prototypes and three production aircraft had been manufactured, but production was scheduled to rise to three aircraft per month throughout 1944. Early production Yorks were principally used as a VIP transport aircraft; notably, the third prototype, LV633 being luxuriously fitted out and becoming the personal transport of Winston Churchill.

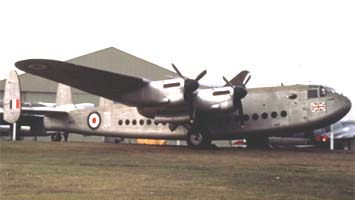
RAF York

On 25 March 1943, RAF Transport Command had been formed, which soon established a clear requirement for the strengthening of Britain's air transport forces; the York became the first British aircraft to be used in quantity by Transport Command. The first Royal Air Force (RAF) production order consisted of 200 aircraft; while a further 100 were ordered under a second order placed shortly after. Throughout 1944, the majority of Yorks produced were passenger transport aircraft, a batch of both pure freighters and combined passenger/freighter-configured Yorks were also manufactured. Several early production aircraft intended for RAF service were instead diverted to BOAC, who had otherwise received little in the way of similar aircraft prior to delivery of the first York in April 1944.

Initial assembly and testing of production Yorks, which were principally destined for service with the RAF at that time, was performed at Ringway, reaching its peak in 1945; these activities later being transferred to facilities in Yeadon, Leeds and Woodford, Cheshire, where work was undertaken at a slower pace. Only eight aircraft of the second order for 100 aircraft were produced; in April 1948, the final York, PE108, was completed.

Abroad, a single pattern aircraft was completed by Victory Aircraft in Canada; however, no further orders were received. Victory had tooled up for the manufacture of 30 aircraft and had built parts for five aircraft, but, ultimately, only one would be completed around the time that the war came to an end. This aircraft would later be purchased by Skyways Ltd.

== Design ==
The Avro York was a high-wing cantilever monoplane, using an all-metal construction, with many similarities to the Lancaster from which it was derived. The wings used a two-spar structure, which housed seven internal fuel tanks between the spars, containing 2,478 imperial gallons (11,270 L; 2,976 US gal). The outboard panels of the wings were tapered on both edges and were furnished with detachable tips. The wings featured all-metal hydraulically-actuated split trailing edge flaps and carried the four Rolls-Royce Merlin engines in four underslung nacelles attached to the front wing spar. Each engine drove a three-bladed constant-speed fully feathering metal propeller, manufactured by de Havilland Hydromatic. The fuselage was of a semi-monocoque construction, complete with a flush-rivetted skin, and was built in five separate sections. The empennage featured a triple tail arrangement.

In a typical passenger configuration, the York could accommodate a 21-seat three-abreast arrangement split between the fore and aft cabins. The main entrance door was set between the two cabins, along with cloakrooms and lavatory and a kitchen and baggage hold was located at the rear of the cabin. Emergency exits were present in the ceiling of each cabin. Passengers were subjected to very noisy conditions due to the aircraft's engines, but from a pilot's perspective, the York was reasonably pleasant to fly.

== Operational history ==
=== Military ===
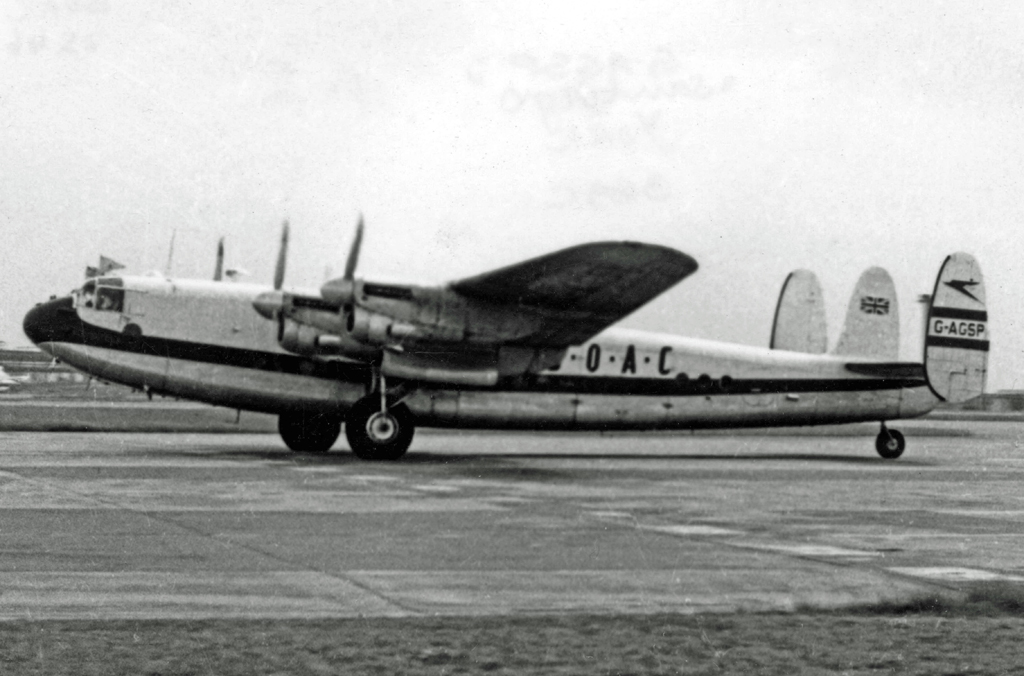
BOAC York operating a freight schedule at Heathrow in 1953

In 1945, No. 511 Squadron became the first squadron to be fully equipped with Yorks; eventually a total of ten squadrons of RAF Transport Command were wholly or partially equipped with the York. In military service, the York was used on all of the trunk routes operated by Transport Command, such as the critical England–India route. Overall, 208 Yorks were manufactured for the RAF.

During the Berlin Airlift, RAF Yorks from seven different squadrons flew over 58,000 sorties to provide the city with vital supplies between 1948 and 1949. In total, in excess of 230,000 tons was carried by the York fleet; the type had borne 43% of the British contribution, alongside other aircraft such as the Douglas Dakota and Handley Page Hastings. Following the end of the Airlift, the RAF retired much of its York fleet; around 40 of these were sold onto civilian operators while many others were scrapped due to the onset of corrosion. During the 1950s, numerous military contracts were issued to civilian York operators.

In 1954, the French Aéronavale procured five Yorks from the British Air Ministry and operated the type at Le Bourget for around a year.

=== Civilian ===
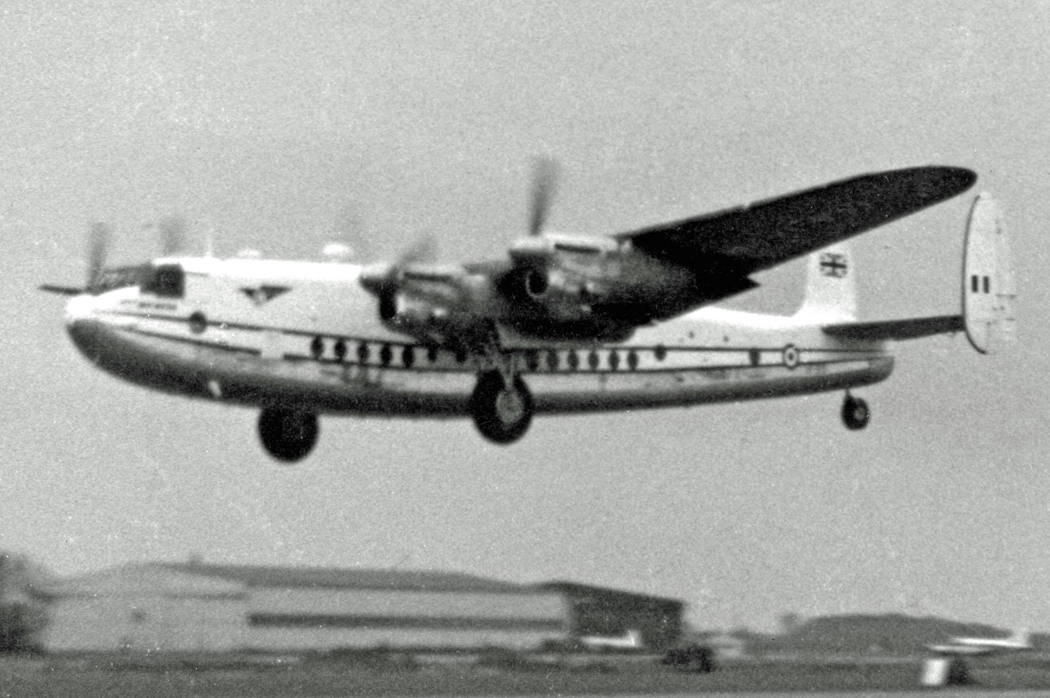
Air Charter York taking off from London Stansted in 1955 on a trooping flight to the Suez Canal Zone

On 21 February 1944, the first civilian York (G-AGJA), initially built for the RAF as MW103, received its airworthiness certificate, thus clearing its delivery shortly thereafter to BOAC. On 22 April 1944, the York inaugurated an initial UK-Morocco-Cairo route. Following the diversion of the first five RAF production Yorks to BOAC, it was decided to allocate a further 60 to the airline but in fact only 25 more were delivered to BOAC. Early BOAC operations were conducted in close collaboration with No. 216 Group RAF; this led to some early Yorks bearing a confusing combination of both civilian registrations and military external markings.

Flights were soon established to Johannesburg, South Africa, in conjunction with South African Airways; Yorks assigned to this route fitted with a total of 12 sleeping berths in addition to passenger seating due to the journey time. The majority of BOAC's York fleet were fully furnished passenger airliners or as combi passenger-cargo aircraft.

In the post-war years, BOAC expanded its use of the York considerably, such as on its Cairo to Durban service, which had previously been operated by Shorts flying boats. Other airlines also adopted the type, such as its use by British South American Airways (BSAAC) on their routes to the Caribbean and South America, prior to their merger into BOAC in September 1949.

On 7 October 1952, BOAC withdrew its Yorks from passenger services, retaining the type for freight operations. BOAC's Yorks continued to operate freight schedules until November 1957 when the last example was withdrawn. After disposal by BOAC and BSAAC, their York fleets were purchased by several UK independent airlines and operated on both passenger and freight flights; these service often included long-distance trooping flights to Jamaica and other UK garrisons. The largest York operator out of the independents was Skyways. In 1964, the last Yorks were retired from service by Skyways and Dan Air.

When the Distant Early Warning Line (Dew Line) was being constructed in Canada in the late 1950s, the York was introduced as a freighter by Associated Airways to support the initiative, these being used later in ordinary airline service. At least one of the Yorks, CF-HAS, was retained, and was in service with Transair as late as 1961.

=== VIP service ===
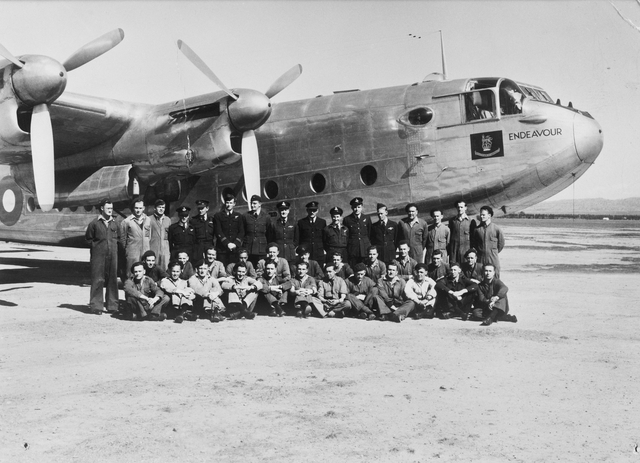
Members of the Governor-General's Flight RAAF in front of the Vice-Regal Avro York in June 1945

The Avro York was, like its Lancaster and Lincoln stablemates, a versatile aircraft. One of the prototypes, LV633, Ascalon, was custom-built as the personal transport and flying conference room for King George VI and Prime Minister Winston Churchill. Ascalon was to be fitted with a special pressurised "egg" so that VIP passengers could be carried without their having to use an oxygen mask. Made of aluminium alloy, the enclosure had eight perspex windows to reduce claustrophobia. It also had a telephone, an instrument panel, drinking facilities and an ashtray with room for cigars, a thermos flask, newspapers and books. Testing at RAE Farnborough found the "egg" to work satisfactorily. Avro said it was too busy with the new Lancaster IV (Avro Lincoln) work so it was never installed in Ascalon. It was considered for installation in the successor aircraft, a Douglas C-54B but the contractor Armstrong Whitworth decided it was impractical and the project was shelved. The whereabouts of "Churchill's Egg" are not known.

MW140, Endeavour, flew to Australia in 1945 to become the personal aircraft of the Duke of Gloucester, Australia's Governor-General. It was operated by the Governor-General's Flight from 1945 to 1947; it was the Royal Australian Air Force's only York. Another York, MW102 was fitted out as a "flying office" for the use of the Viceroy of India and C-in-C South East Asia Command, Lord Mountbatten. During its first major overhaul by Avro at Manchester (Ringway) in 1945, the aircraft was repainted a light duck egg green, a shade intended to cool down the aeroplane, instead of its former normal camouflage colour scheme. South African leader Jan Smuts also used a York as his personal transport. Air Chief Marshal Sir Trafford Leigh-Mallory was killed on 14 November 1944, while flying to his new posting in Ceylon to take command of Allied air operations in the Pacific, when York MW126 struck a ridge in the French Alps in a blizzard, 30 miles (48 km) south of Grenoble, France. His wife Dora and eight aircrew also died. The wreckage was found by a villager in June 1945.

== Variants ==
Avro 685 prototypes
LV626 – prototype first flown with twin-tail and later converted to C.II standard
LV629 – prototype fitted with passenger seats
LV633 – prototype fitted as a flying conference room, later used by Winston Churchill
LV639 – prototype fitted as a paratroop drop variant with a drop hatch in the floor
York I
Four-engined civilian transport aircraft, 45 built
York C.I
Four-engined military transport aircraft for the RAF, 208 built by Avro and one by Victory Aircraft.
York C.II
One prototype York aircraft converted with four Bristol Hercules XVI radial piston engines.

== Operators ==
=== Military operators ===
Australia

- Royal Australian Air Force
  - Governor-General's Flight RAAF

France

- French Air Force
- Aeronavale

South Africa

- South African Air Force

United Kingdom

- Aeroplane and Armament Experimental Establishment (Boscombe Down)
- Airborne Forces Experimental Establishment (Beaulieu)
- Royal Aircraft Establishment (Farnborough)
- Royal Air Force
  - No. 24 Squadron RAF 1943–1951 at various bases in England
  - No. 40 Squadron RAF 1947–1950 (RAF Abingdon, England)
  - No. 51 Squadron RAF 1946–1950 at various bases in England
  - No. 59 Squadron RAF 1947–1950 (RAF Abingdon, England)
  - No. 99 Squadron RAF 1947–1949 (RAF Lyneham, England)
  - No. 206 Squadron RAF 1947–1950 (RAF Lyneham, England)
  - No. 232 Squadron RAF
  - No. 242 Squadron RAF 1945–1949 at various bases in England
  - No. 246 Squadron RAF 1944–1946 (RAF Holmsley South, England)
  - No. 511 Squadron RAF 1943–1949 (RAF Lyneham, England)
  - No. 241 Operational Conversion Unit RAF (RAF Dishforth, England)
  - Air Command South East Asia Communications Squadron (RAF Ratmalana, Ceylon)
  - Air Transport Tactical Development Unit (RAF Netheravon, England)
  - Empire Air Navigation School (RAF Shawbury, England)
  - Far East Communications Squadron (RAF Changi, Singapore)
  - Metropolitan Communications Squadron (RAF Hendon, England)
  - Transport Command Development Unit
  - Transport Command Examining Unit
  - 1310 Flight RAF (RAF Upavon, England)
  - 1359 Flight RAF (RAF Lyneham then RAF Bassingbourn, England)
  - 1332 Heavy Conversion Unit at various bases in England and Northern Ireland
- Telecommunications Research Establishment (Defford, England)

=== Civil operators ===
Aden

- Aden Airways

Argentina

- Flota Aérea Mercante Argentina (FAMA)
- Aerolíneas Argentinas

Canada

- Arctic Wings
- Associated Airways
- Maritime Central Airways
- Pacific Western Airlines
- Spartan Air Services
- Transair (Canada)

Iran

- Persian Air Services

Lebanon

- Air Liban
- Middle East Airlines
- Trans Mediterranean Airways

South Africa

- South African Airways - operated Yorks leased from BOAC as stopgap until taking delivery of DC-4s and Avro Tudors
- Tropic Airways

United Kingdom

- Air Charter - 10 operated from 1952 to 1956.
- BOAC
- British South American Airways
- Dan-Air
- Eagle Aviation
- Hunting-Clan Air Transport
- Scottish Airlines
- Skyways
- Surrey Flying Services

== Aircraft on display ==
While there are no flying examples of the Avro York, there are two complete examples on display in the United Kingdom. Both aircraft were initially allocated to the RAF, but were used by civil operators for most of their flying careers; both aircraft were issued with military and civil registrations.

Avro York TS798, G-AGNV

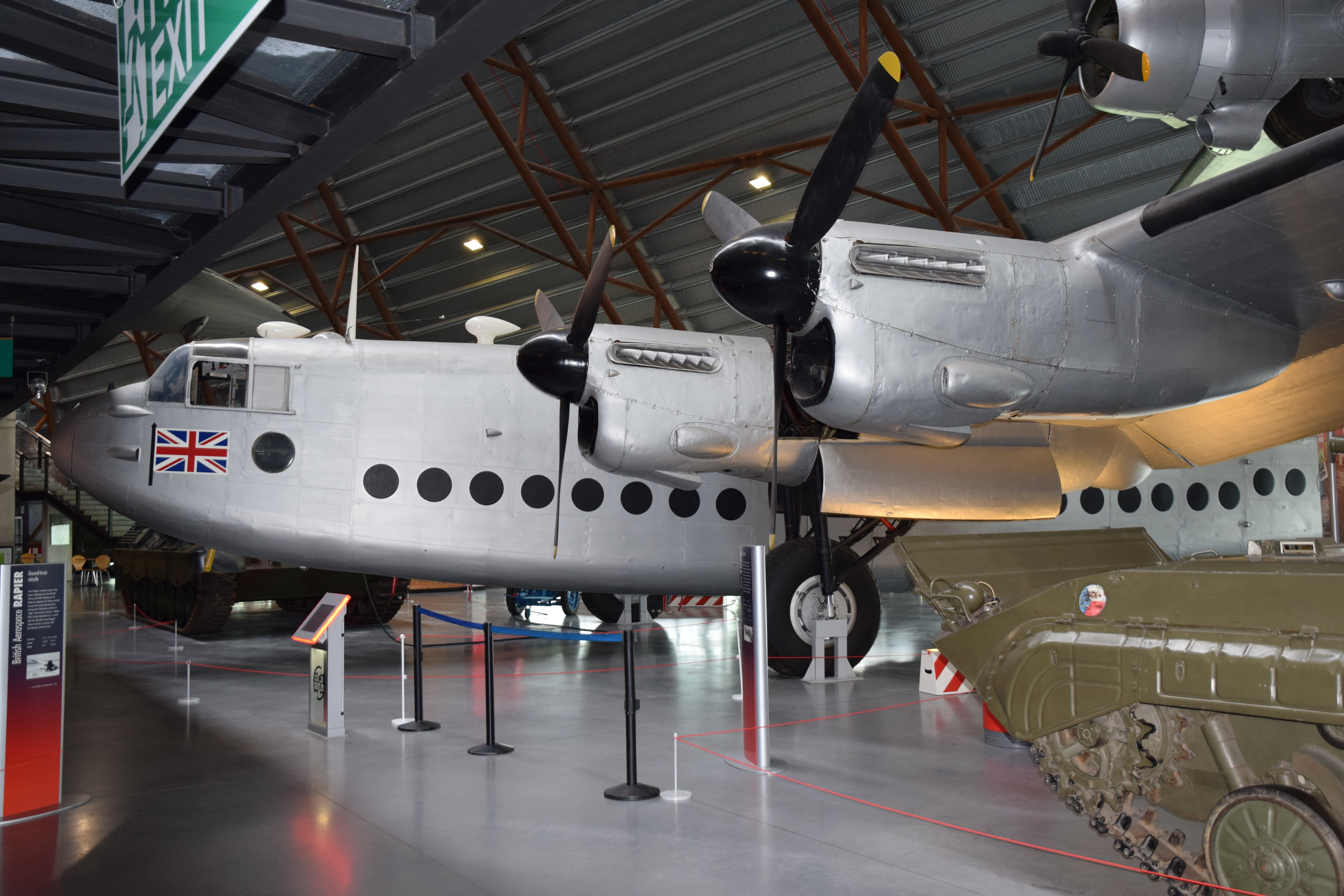
Avro 685 York C1, TS798 (G-AGNV) at the RAF Museum Cosford, 2020

Avro 685 York C1, TS798 (cn 1223), now part of the collection of the Royal Air Force Museum Midlands, Cosford. This aircraft was completed in October 1945 and intended for the RAF as TS798, but quickly passed to BOAC and given the civil registration G-AGNV. In BOAC service it flew routes in South Asia and Africa until 1950. In 1955 it was acquired by Skyways, who operated it until 1964.

It was sold to the Skyways airframe collection for preservation and made the last ever flight by a York when it flew from Heathrow to Gloucestershire Airport to join the collection. It was sold to the RAF Museum in 1972. In 1973 it was restored and painted in RAF markings to represent another aircraft, MW100; it was moved to the RAF Museum's Cosford site in 1976, where it is currently displayed.

Avro York MW232, G-ANTK

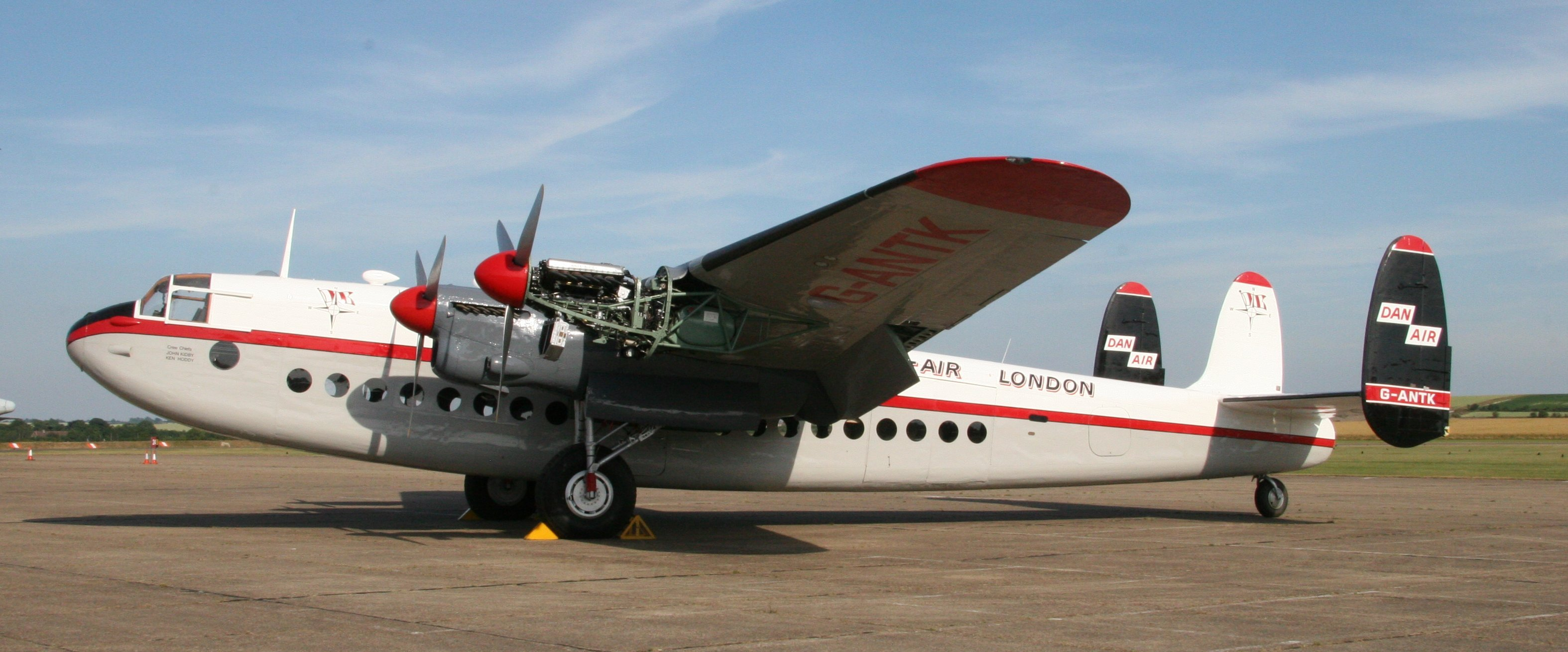
Avro York G-ANTK at the Imperial War Museum Duxford, temporarily outside before being moved to a new hangar (2006)

Displayed at the Imperial War Museum Duxford: Avro 685 York C1, G-ANTK is an ex-Dan Air London aircraft. This airframe was built at Yeadon, near Leeds, in January 1946 and entered RAF service with 242 Squadron as MW232 that August. It joined the fleet of Allied aircraft engaged in the Berlin Airlift and in May 1947, the York moved to 511 Squadron at Lyneham, where it served until May 1950 when it was used by Fairey Aviation for flight refuelling research. It then retired to 12 Maintenance Unit at Kirkbride for storage prior to disposal. In July 1954, MW232 became G-ANTK with Dan Air and it was used for freight work until its retirement in May 1964.

It was ferried to Lasham Airfield and used as a bunk house by the Air Scouts until 1974. The Dan Air preservation group took it over and began to restore the aircraft in their spare time. In the mid-1980s, Dan Air realised the impracticality of the restoration work being undertaken and began negotiations with the Duxford Aviation Society. In May 1986, the aircraft was dismantled and on 23 May made its journey to Duxford on seven low-loaders.

== Accidents and incidents ==
The Avro York had 87 hull-loss accidents or incidents with the following list of accidents involving fatalities and major hull-losses. This information is primarily derived from: Piston Engine Airliner Production List (1991) and Aviation Safety Network.:

- 14 November 1944: An RAF York crashed near Grenoble, France, killing all ten aboard, including Air Chief Marshal Trafford Leigh-Mallory.
- 2 February 1945: An RAF York crashed off Lampedusa Island.
- 29 December 1945: An RAF York crashed and was destroyed by fire near New Milton, Hampshire, England.
- 11 April 1946: An RAF York crashed and burned on takeoff from RAF Woodbridge, one of the six crew on board was killed.
- 7 September 1946: A British South American Airways York Star Leader on a flight from London to Buenos Aires via Lisbon, Bathurst, Natal, Rio de Janeiro and Montevideo, crashed shortly after takeoff from Bathurst, The Gambia. The captain lost control of the aircraft as it was climbing. The accident killed all 24 passengers and crew on board.
- 6 October 1946: An RAF York crashed in the Bay of Bengal.
- 20 October 1946: An RAF York crashed on takeoff from Dum Dum, Calcutta, India.
- 20 November 1946: An RAF York crashed in the desert south of Helwan, Egypt.
- 23 December 1946: A Flota Aérea Mercante Argentina York crashed into a mountain 31 km from Rio de Janeiro, Brazil.
- 18 March 1947: An RAF York crashed and burnt out near Negombo Town after departure from Negombo, Ceylon.
- 13 April 1947: British South American Airways York Star Speed crashed on landing at Dakar, Senegal.
- 1 July 1947: An RAF York crashed after overshooting at RAF Oakington.
- 16 July 1947: A BOAC York crashed near Basra, Iraq.
- 17 November 1947: An RAF York crashed after overshooting at RAF Dishforth, Yorkshire.
- 16 February 1948: An RAF York was damaged beyond repair during a landing at RAF Hullavington.
- 4 July 1948: An RAF York collided with a Scandinavian Airlines System DC-6 over Northwood, London, killing all seven passengers and crew on the York and 32 passengers and crew on the DC-6. See 1948 Northwood mid-air collision.
- 19 September 1948: An RAF York crashed on takeoff from Wunstorf, West Germany.
- 5 January 1949: British South American Airways York Star Venture crashed at Caravellos Bay, Brazil.
- 15 March 1949: A Skyways York crashed on approach to Gatow, (southwest of West Berlin), West Germany.
- 2 February 1953: A Skyways York crashed into the sea off Newfoundland, Canada after an SOS was sent by the pilots. The wreck of the aircraft was never found; all 39 passengers and crew died.
- 26 June 1954: A Skyways York crashed landed at Kyritz, East Germany.
- 26 May 1955: An Associated Airways York was damaged beyond repair after hitting an obstacle on takeoff from Edmonton Municipal Airport, Canada.
- 29 September 1955: An Associated Airways York was damaged beyond repair after ditching into the Thoa River near Yellowknife, North West Territories, Canada.
- 18 February 1956: A Scottish Airlines York crashed at Malta due to pilot error, killing all 50 passengers and crew. See 1956 Scottish Airlines Malta air disaster
- 30 April 1956: A Scottish Airlines York crashed on takeoff from Stansted Airport, Essex.
- 26 September 1956: A Maritime Central Airways York was damaged beyond repair in a forced landing in Quebec, Canada.
- 8 January 1957: A Transair (Canada) York was destroyed by fire after crash landing on a lake in Hudson Bay, Canada.
- 25 June 1957: A Pacific Western Airlines York was damaged beyond repair after an accident at Cape Perry, North West Territories, Canada.
- 23 December 1957: A cargo Scottish Airlines York crashed near Stansted on approach to the airport, killing all four crew.
- 25 May 1958: A Dan-Air York crashed at Guragon, Punjab, India.
- 29 September 1958: A Middle East Airlines York went missing over the Mediterranean Sea somewhere between Beirut and Rome.
- 15 March 1963: A Trans Mediterranean Airways York crashed seven miles southeast of Karaj, Iran.

== Specifications (Avro York) ==
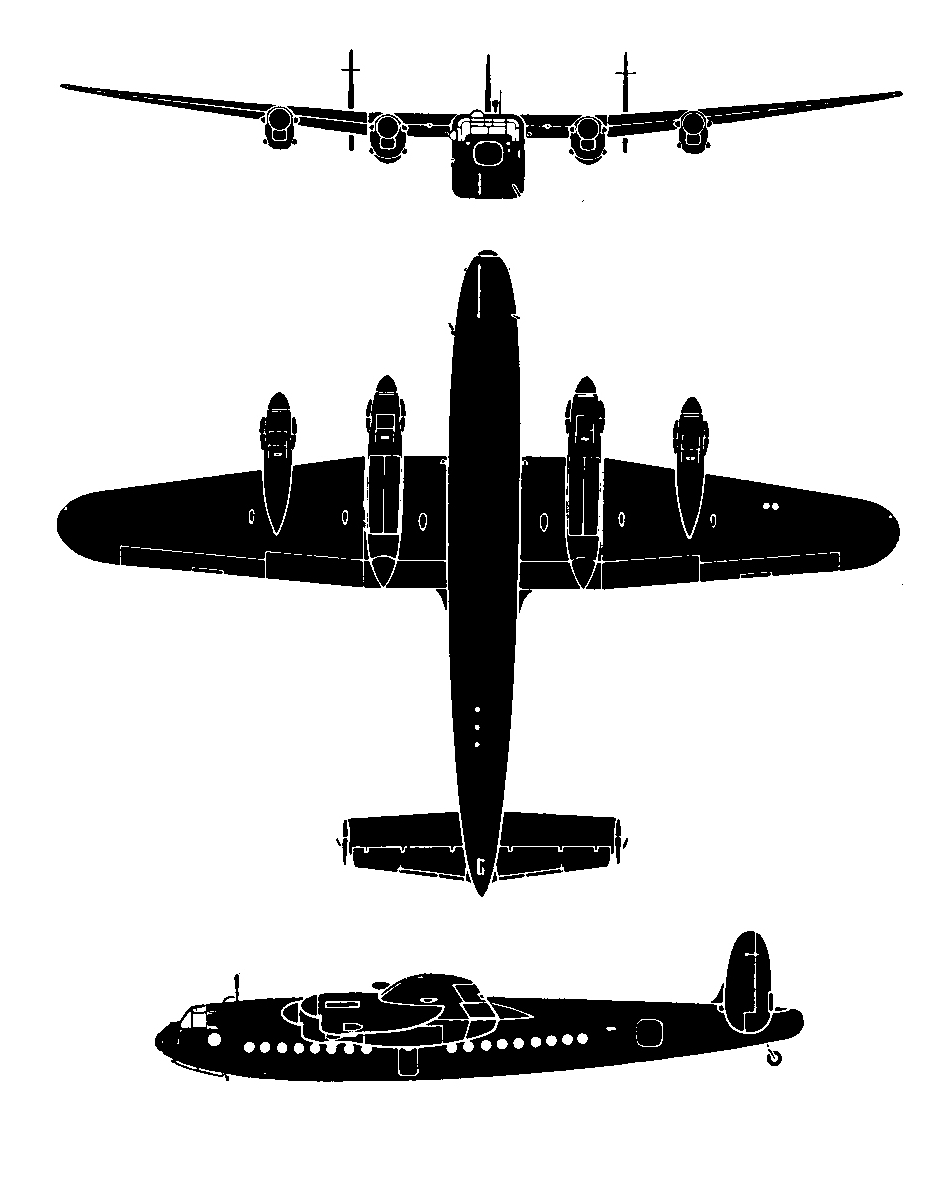
Avro York

Data from Jane's Fighting Aircraft of World War II, The Avro York & Berlin Airlift

General characteristics

- Crew: 5 (two pilots, navigator, wireless operator, cabin steward)
- Capacity: 56 passengers / 16,500 lb (7,500 kg) cargo (Note: In April 1950 a York was used to transport a 21,000 lb (9,500 kg) propeller shaft.)
- Length: 78 ft 6 in (23.93 m)
- Wingspan: 102 ft 0 in (31.09 m)
- Height: 16 ft 6 in (5.03 m)
- Wing area: 1,297 sq ft (120.5 m^{2})
- Empty weight: 40,000 lb (18,144 kg)
- Gross weight: 65,000 lb (29,484 kg)
- Powerplant: 4 × Rolls-Royce Merlin 24 V-12 liquid-cooled piston engines, 1,280 hp (950 kW) each
- Propellers: 3-bladed constant-speed propellers

Performance

- Maximum speed: 298 mph (480 km/h, 259 kn)
- Range: 3,000 mi (4,800 km, 2,600 nmi)
- Service ceiling: 23,000 ft (7,000 m)
- Rate of climb: 820 ft/min (4.2 m/s)
- Wing loading: 54 lb/sq ft (260 kg/m^{2})
- Power/mass: 0.079 hp/lb (0.130 kW/kg)

== See also ==
External videos
- Images of Yorks in service
- Footage of Yorks during Operation Vittles, 1948
- News report on the crash of a York, 1956

Related development

- Avro Lancaster
- Avro Lancastrian

Aircraft of comparable role, configuration, and era

- Armstrong Whitworth Ensign
- Airspeed Ambassador
- Handley Page Hastings – evolved from the Handley Page Halifax
- Vickers VC.1 Viking – evolved from the Vickers Wellington
- Boeing 307 Stratoliner – American, derived from the Boeing B-17 Flying Fortress
- Consolidated R2Y – American, derived from the Consolidated B-24 Liberator

Related lists

- List of aircraft of World War II
- List of aircraft of the Royal Air Force
- List of civil aircraft
