= Sikorsky RS =

RS
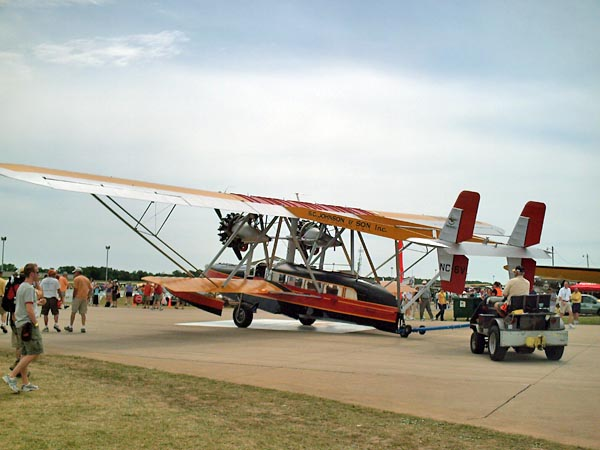
- Sikorsky S-38

General information
- Type: Flying boat
- Manufacturer: Sikorsky Aircraft
- Designer: Igor Sikorsky
- Primary user: United States Navy

The Sikorsky RS was a designation used by the United States Navy for a number of different Sikorsky twin-engined amphibious flying boats.

== Variants ==
RS-1
Designation for three Sikorsky S-41 flying boats for evaluation.
XRS-2
Designation for two Sikorsky PS-2 flying boats converted as transports.
RS-3
Four Sikorsky PS-3 flying boats converted as transports.
RS-4
Designation for two impressed Sikorsky S-40A flying boats.
RS-5
Designation for two impressed Sikorsky S-41 flying boats.

== See also ==
Related lists

- List of United States Navy aircraft designations (pre-1962)
