= Sikorsky S-40 =

1931 American amphibious flying boat

S-40
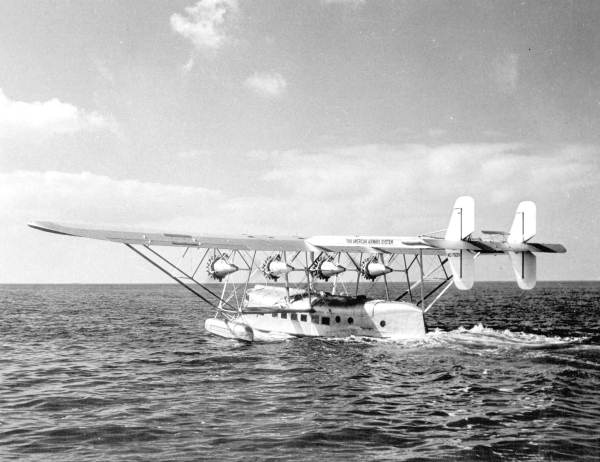
- Sikorsky S-40 PanAm 1931

General information
- Type: Amphibious flying boat
- National origin: United States
- Manufacturer: Sikorsky Aircraft
- Designer: Igor Sikorsky
- Primary user: Pan American Airways
- Number built: 3

History
- Introduction date: August 7, 1931
- First flight: August 6, 1931
- Developed from: Sikorsky S-38
- Developed into: Sikorsky S-42

The Sikorsky S-40 was an American amphibious flying boat built by Sikorsky in the early 1930s for Pan American Airways. During World War II they were used by the United States Navy for training.

This was the first of flying clippers, large flying boats of the 1930s used for long distance air travel. More advanced designs soon followed, but the S-40 was a big step forward as it could carry 38 passengers as opposed to the S-38's eight.

== Design and development ==
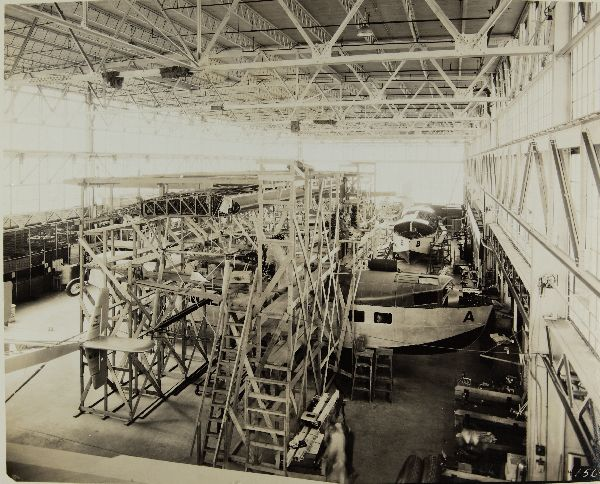
S-40 under construction

Sikorsky designed the S-40 in response to a request from Juan Trippe, president of Pan American Airways, for a larger passenger-carrying airplane. The S-40 could carry 38 passengers, a significant increase over the S-38's eight passengers. Wind tunnel testing of the S-40 started in October 1928, and models of the hull were tested in April 1929. The aircraft featured a pantry with an electric refrigerator and stove as well as a smoking lounge with book-ended mahogany wood paneling. Six life rafts were carried.

Despite a significant size increase over the preceding S-38, the S-40 design was a conservative iteration of the smaller aircraft; the numerous flying wires and strut braces that were used in the exterior support framework caused significant drag and prompted Charles Lindbergh, retained as a consultant for Pan American, to tell Sikorsky "it would be like flying a forest through the air." Only three were built as Sikorsky began designing the more advanced and streamlined S-42 shortly after the S-40 entered service, based partly on input from Lindbergh. All three S-40s were built by the Vought-Sikorsky Aircraft Division of the United Aircraft in Stratford, Connecticut.

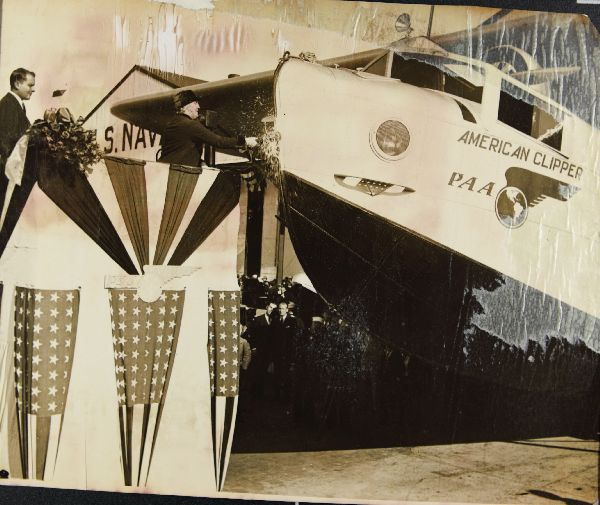
Lou Henry Hoover (first lady of the United States) christens American Clipper, October 12, 1931

The first test flight occurred on August 6, 1931. The first aircraft was christened American Clipper by Lou Henry Hoover, wife of President Herbert Hoover, on October 12, 1931 at NAS Anacostia; after its christening, American Clipper flew around Washington, D.C.

In 1935, all three aircraft were upgraded and re-designated as the Sikorsky S-40A. Upgrades included replacing the original 575 hp (429 kW) Pratt & Whitney R-1860 Hornet B engines with smaller displacement but more powerful supercharged 660 hp (490 kW) R-1690 Hornet T2D1 engines, eliminating the landing gear, and increasing the maximum weight slightly. Another source states the landing gear was removed soon after the type certificate was issued.

== Operational history ==
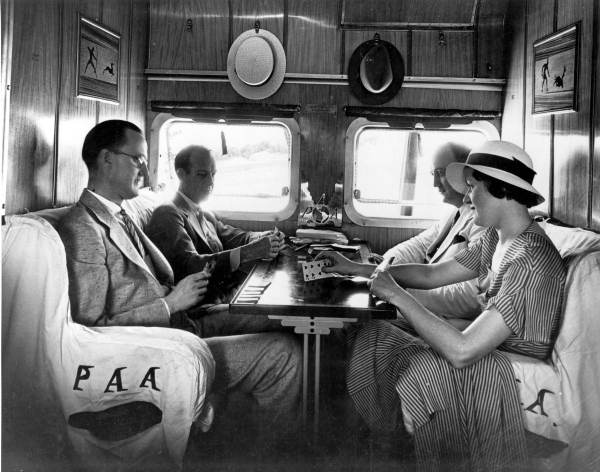
Passengers in a S-40 cabin

Passenger carrying service was initiated on November 19, 1931, with a S-40 piloted by Charles Lindbergh and Basil Rowe, flying from Miami, Florida to the Panama Canal Zone with stops at Cienfuegos, Cuba; Kingston, Jamaica, and Barranquilla, Colombia. Igor Sikorsky, the aircraft's designer, was on board as a passenger. During that trip, Sikorsky and Lindbergh began working on concepts that were used in the succeeding S-42.

The S-40 was Pan American's first large flying boat. American Clipper served as the flagship of Pan Am's clipper fleet and this aircraft model was the first to earn the popular designation of "Clipper" or "Pan Am Clipper". The three S-40s served without incident during their civilian lives, flying a total of over 10 million miles.

=== Navy Service ===
They were retired around 1940 and turned over to the US Navy during World War II, who used them as trainers for four-engined flight instruction. Under Navy service, the aircraft were designated Sikorsky RS-4. (see also Sikorsky RS) Two of the S-40 were pressed into Navy service, and called RS-4.

In July 1943, an RS-4 (752V) was coming in for beaching when it struck an unforeseen submerged rock, which damaged the wheel strut, which in turn caused a list that led to a pontoon striking a rail at the edge of the ramp. Beaching is when the flying boat is on the water, but brings its wheels down to come on to land, usually by a seaplane ramp. Another was damaged at Dinner Key in April 1943, and then returned to Pan-American by the Navy, however it was not returned to service but was used for spare parts.

== List ==
Sikorsky S-40 aircraft of Pan American Airways
| Name | Image | Registration | Delivered | Left service | Notes | Ref. |
|---|---|---|---|---|---|---|
| American Clipper | | NC80V | October 12, 1931 | | Christened by Lou Henry Hoover on October 12, 1931 at NAS Anacostia. Acquired by Navy in April 1942. Damaged beyond repair on April 3, 1943. | |
| Caribbean Clipper | | NC81V | November 1931 | | | |
| Southern Clipper | | NC752V | August 1932 | | Damaged on July 9, 1943 in Navy service while being beached. | |

== Specifications (S-40) ==
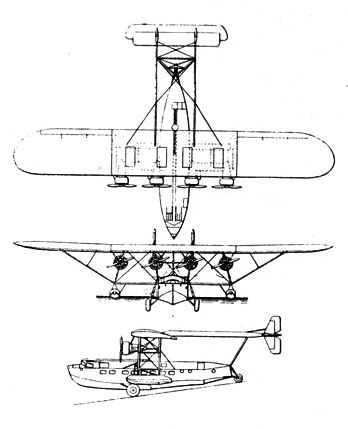
Sikorsky S-40 3-view drawing from L'Aerophile April 1932

Data from American airplane specifications

General characteristics

- Crew: 6 crew
- Capacity: 38 passengers
- Length: 76 ft 0 in (23.16 m)
- Wingspan: 114 ft 0 in (34.75 m)
- Height: 23 ft 0 in (7.01 m)
- Wing area: 1,740 sq ft (162 m^{2})
- Empty weight: 23,000 lb (10,433 kg)
- Gross weight: 34,000 lb (15,422 kg)
- Fuel capacity: 1,066 US gal (888 imp gal; 4,040 L)
- Powerplant: 4 × Pratt & Whitney Hornet 9-cylinder radial engines, 575 hp (429 kW) each

Performance

- Maximum speed: 117 kn (135 mph, 217 km/h)
- Cruise speed: 97 kn (112 mph, 180 km/h)
- Stall speed: 56 kn (64 mph, 103 km/h)
- Range: 780 nmi (900 mi, 1,400 km)
- Service ceiling: 13,000 ft (4,000 m)
- Rate of climb: 700 ft/min (3.6 m/s)

== See also ==
Related development

- Sikorsky S-42

Aircraft of comparable role, configuration, and era

- Consolidated Commodore
- Dornier Do R
- Dornier Do S
- Short Kent

Related lists

- List of flying boats and floatplanes
