= Charles Herbert Colvin =

American aeronautical engineer

Charles Herbert Colvin (March 4, 1893 – July 3, 1985) was an aeronautical engineer who was the co-founder of the Pioneer Instrument Company in Brooklyn, with Brice Herbert Goldsborough and Morris M. Titterington.

== Biography ==
Colvin was born in Sterling, Massachusetts, in 1893 to Fred Herbert Colvin (1867–1965) and Mary K. Loring (1869–?). He co-founded the Pioneer Instrument Company in 1919, and sold the company in 1929 to the Bendix Corporation. In the early 1950s, he started Colvin Laboratories, which manufactured aeronautical instruments, in East Orange, New Jersey. He retired from business in 1963.

He married Bessie Colvin Davis (c.1900–1956). After her death he married Marjorie Colvin Babcock. He had four children from his first marriage, two daughters, Margaret Colvin Tropp of Woodland Hills, California, and Elizabeth Colvin Davis of Madison, Wisconsin, and two sons, David ("Gene") Colvin, of Old Lyme, Connecticut, and Roger Colvin; a stepdaughter, Dagny Sellorin of Portland, Oregon; a brother, Henry Colvin, of Medford, New Jersey; at the time of his death he had seven grandchildren, and one great-grandchild, Caitlin Colvin. He died July 3, 1985, at St. Joseph Hospital in Ojai, California, after a long illness. He was 92 years old and had been living in Ojai.

== Patent ==
- U.S. patent GB429717 May 6, 1935; "Improvements in navigating and calculating apparatus for aircraft"

== References in periodicals ==
- The New York Times; July 14, 1985; Obituary
