= Frances Wilson Grayson =

American aviator (1892–1927)

- Born: c. 1892; Cherokee City, Arkansas
- Died: c. December 23, 1927 (age 35) probably off Nova Scotia
- Occupation: Aviator
- Spouse: John Brady Grayson
- Parent(s): A. J. Wilson and Minnie M. Lewis

Frances Wilson Grayson (c. 1892 – c. December 23, 1927) was an American woman who disappeared flying to Newfoundland just before her attempt to cross the Atlantic Ocean. She was a niece of President Woodrow Wilson.

== Biography ==
Grayson was born as Frances Wilson in Cherokee City, Arkansas, to Andrew Jackson "A.J." Wilson and Minnie M. Lewis. She had two brothers: Walter M. Wilson later became a grocer in Muncie, Indiana. The other, Roscoe Jesse "Jack" Wilson died young (before 1924). In 1896, the family moved from Arkansas to Indiana, where she graduated from Muncie High School in Muncie. She next attended the Chicago Musical College in Chicago, Illinois. Her plan was to accompany her brother "Jack", who planned to be a professional singer. When her brother died she stopped studying music. She then attended Swarthmore College in Swarthmore, Pennsylvania, for recitation and dramatic arts.

At Swarthmore College, she met John Brady Grayson, and they married on September 15, 1914. They divorced with no children after nine years. Frances Grayson then moved to Manhattan, New York City, where she was a writer for a newspaper. She then became a real estate agent.

While in Manhattan, Grayson became interested in aviation and in the idea of making a flight across the Atlantic Ocean. She bought a new Sikorsky S-36 amphibian plane, which she named Dawn, and received financing for the flight from Mrs. Aage Ancker. She recruited Royal Norwegian Navy Lieutenant Oskar Omdal to serve as the aircraft's pilot, Brice Goldsborough as its navigator, and Frank Koehler as its radio engineer. They made plans to begin the transatlantic flight from the Dominion of Newfoundland. Omdal was to fly the plane across the Atlantic, although Grayson may have planned to perform some of the flying herself.

== Disappearance ==
The four took off from Curtiss Field on Long Island, New York, on the evening of December 23, 1927, bound for Harbor Grace in Newfoundland. They radioed that something was wrong later in the evening and never reached Newfoundland; their remains were never found. Their plane probably went down in the Atlantic off Nova Scotia during a storm. Grayson was 35 years old at the time of her death.

== Legacy ==
In 1928, the Ontario Surveyor General named a number of lakes in the northwest of the province to honour aviators who had perished during 1927, mainly in attempting oceanic flights. These include Goldsborough Lake (50.70°N 89.34°W), Grayson Lake (50.88°N 89.43°W) and Omdahl [sic] Lake (50.81°N 89.49°W) which are in close proximity to each other in the Wabakimi Provincial Park.

== See also ==
- Elsie Mackay, missing female aviator
- Amelia Earhart, missing female aviator
- Amy Johnson, missing female aviator
- List of missing aircraft
- List of people who disappeared mysteriously at sea
