= Martin XT6M =

General information
- Type: Torpedo-bomber
- National origin: United States
- Manufacturer: Martin
- Primary user: United States Navy
- Number built: 1

History
- First flight: 1930

The Martin XT6M was an American biplane torpedo bomber, designed and built by Martin for the United States Navy. Designated XT6M-1, it was powered a 575 hp (429 kW) Pratt & Whitney R-1860 radial engine and was delivered in 1930 for evaluation, but no others were built.
