= Oskar Omdal =

Norwegian naval officer

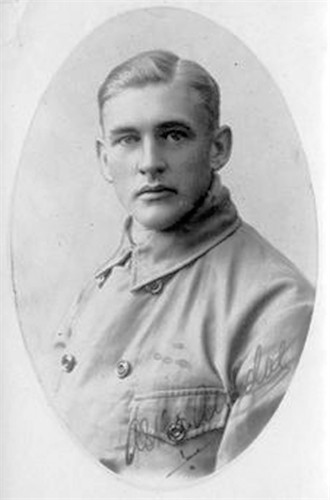
- Oskar Omdal ca. 1924
- Born: October 11, 1895; Kristiansand, Norway
- Died: December 23, 1927 (aged 32); Atlantic Ocean
- Occupation: Pilot of the Royal Norwegian Navy
- Known for: Mysteriously disappearing during trans-Atlantic flight

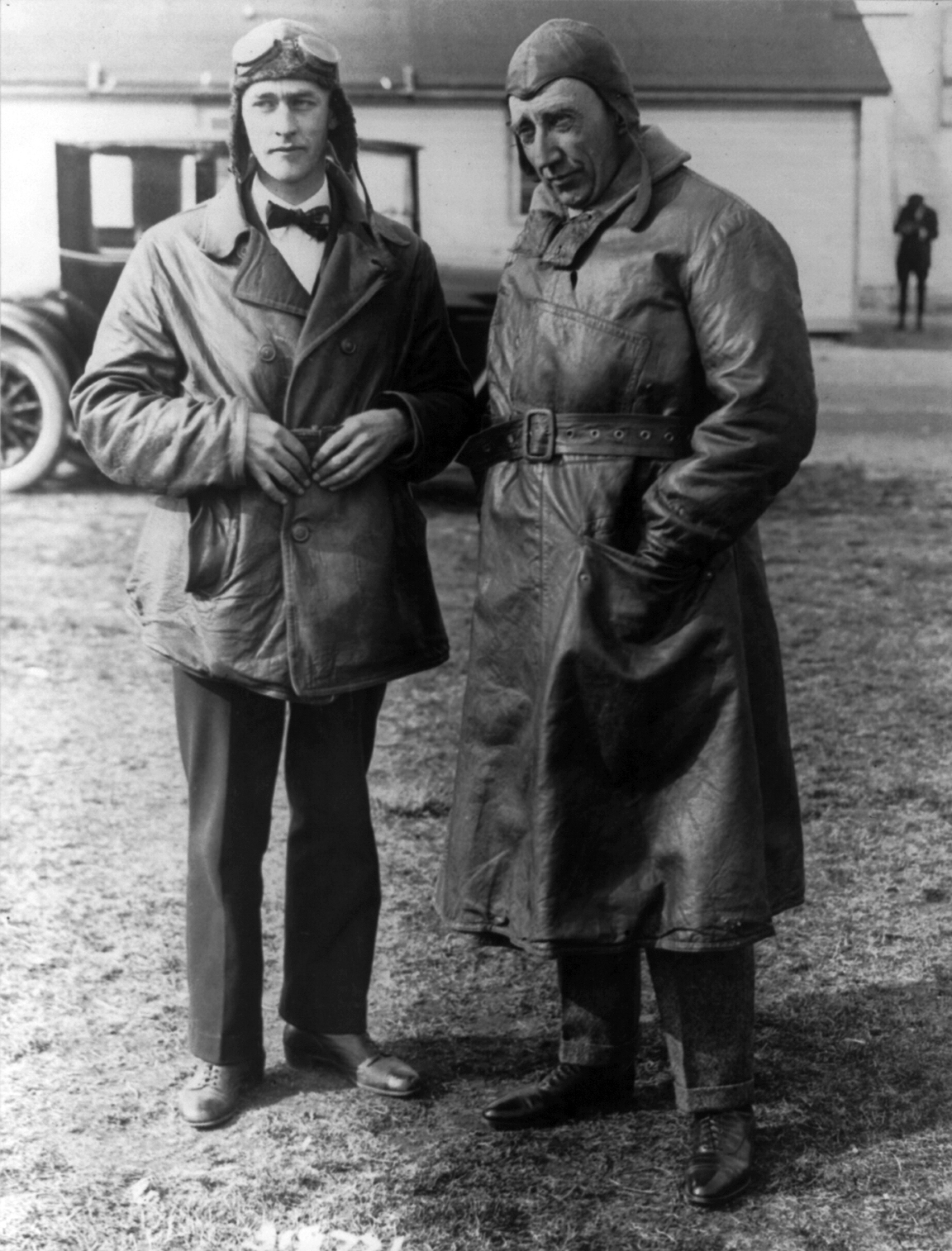
Oskar Omdal (left) with Roald Amundsen, 1922

Oskar Omdal (October 11, 1895 – December 23, 1927) was a lieutenant and pilot in the Royal Norwegian Navy.

== Biography ==
He was born at Kristiansand in Vest-Agder, Norway. He attended the Technical School at Porsgrunn. He graduated from the Norwegian Naval Flight School (Marinens Flygeskole) at Horten in 1919. He was promoted to lieutenant in the Royal Norwegian Navy during 1922.

In 1923 with Roald Amundsen he tried to fly from Wainwright, Alaska, to Spitsbergen across the North Pole, but their aircraft was damaged and they abandoned the journey. In 1925, Omdal was a mechanic on Lincoln Ellsworth and Roald Amundsen's attempted flight to the North Pole.

== Disappearance ==
Omdal took off on December 23, 1927, from Curtiss Field on Long Island, New York, with Frances Wilson Grayson, navigator Brice Goldsborough and engineer Frank Koehler headed for Harbor Grace in Newfoundland. This flight was in preparation for Grayson's planned crossing of the Atlantic Ocean to set the record for the first woman to cross. The twin-engine air-craft Dawn, an amphibious Sikorsky S-36, and its crew never arrived. No trace of the plane or the four aviators was found.

== Legacy ==
Oscar Omdal street in Stavanger and Oscar Omdal terrace in the Hamresanden district of Kristiansand are both named after him.

In 1928, the Ontario Surveyor General named a number of lakes in the northwest of the province to honour aviators who had perished during 1927, mainly in attempting oceanic flights. These include Goldsborough Lake (50.70°N 89.34°W), Grayson Lake (50.88°N 89.43°W) and Omdahl [sic] Lake (50.81°N 89.49°W) which are in close proximity to each other in the Wabakimi Provincial Park.

== See also ==
- List of missing aircraft
- List of people who disappeared mysteriously at sea

== Other sources ==
- Arlov, Thor B. (2003) Svalbards historie (Trondheim: Akademisk Forlag) ISBN 82-519-1851-0
- Hafsten, Bjørn/Arheim, Tor (2003) Marinens Flygevåpen 1912 – 1944 (Tankestreken forlag) ISBN 82-993535-1-3
