= Boeing Monomail =

American mail plane (1930–1933)

Model 200 and 221 Monomail
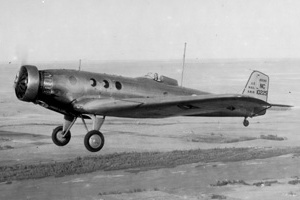
- Model 221

General information
- Type: Airliner
- National origin: United States
- Manufacturer: Boeing
- Status: Retired
- Primary user: United Airlines
- Number built: 1 Model 200; 1 Model 221

History
- First flight: 6 May 1930
- Retired: 1933
- Developed into: Boeing YB-9

The Boeing Model 200 Monomail was an American mail plane of the early 1930s.

== Design and development ==
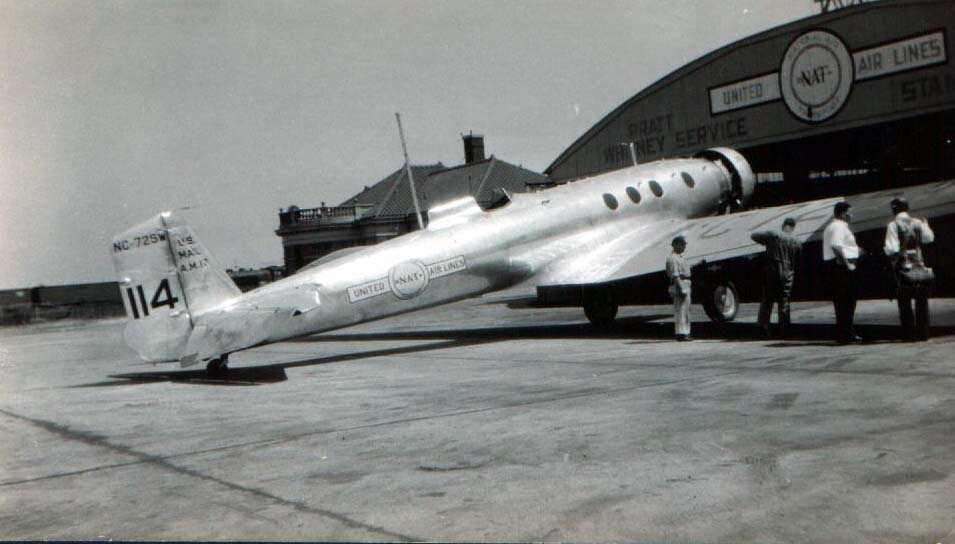
Model 221 of United Airlines

The aircraft marked a departure from the traditional biplane configuration for a transport aircraft, instead featuring a single, low set, all metal cantilever wing. Retractable landing gear and a streamlined fuselage added to the aerodynamic efficiency of the aircraft. A single example was constructed for evaluation by both Boeing and the US Army (under the designation Y1C-18) but no mass production ensued, and the aircraft eventually joined Boeing's fleet on the San Francisco-Chicago air mail route from July 1931.

A second version was developed as the Model 221, with a fuselage stretched by 8 inches (20 cm) that sacrificed some of its cargo capacity to carry six passengers in an enclosed cabin; the single pilot, however, sat in an open cockpit. This version first flew on 18 August 1930. Both the Model 200 and the Model 221 were eventually modified for transcontinental service as the Model 221A, with slight fuselage stretches to give both a cabin for eight passengers. These aircraft were flown on United Air Lines' Cheyenne-Chicago route.

The advanced design of the Monomail was hampered by the lack of suitable engine and propeller technology. By the time variable-pitch propellers and more powerful engines were available, the design had been surpassed by multi-engined aircraft, including Boeing's own 247. However, many advancements of the Monomail were incorporated into the designs of the most advanced bomber and fighter aircraft of the early 1930s, the Boeing B-9 and the Model 248 (later developed into the P-26 Peashooter of the USAAC), respectively.

== Variants ==
Model 200
mailplane (1 built)
Model 221
mailplane with capacity for 6 passengers (1 built)
Model 221A
Model 200 and 221 converted as 8-passenger airliners
Model 231
Planned lengthened version of Model 221, not built.

== Operators ==
United States

- Boeing Air Transport
- United Air Lines

== Specifications (Model 221) ==
General characteristics

- Crew: One pilot
- Capacity: 6 passengers
- Length: 42 ft 0 in (12.75 m)
- Wingspan: 59 ft 0 in (18 m)
- Airfoil: Boeing 106
- Gross weight: 8,000 lb (3,629 kg)
- Powerplant: 1 × Pratt & Whitney R-1860 Hornet B radial engine, 575 hp (429 kW)
- Propellers: 2-bladed

Performance

- Maximum speed: 158 mph (254 km/h, 137 kn)
- Cruise speed: 135 mph (217 km/h, 117 kn)
- Range: 575 mi (925 km, 500 nmi)
- Service ceiling: 14,700 ft (4,500 m)

== See also ==
Aircraft of comparable role, configuration, and era

- Lockheed Model 9 Orion
- Northrop Alpha
