= Pratt & Whitney R-1860 Hornet B =

Early 20th century aircraft engine

R-1860 Hornet B
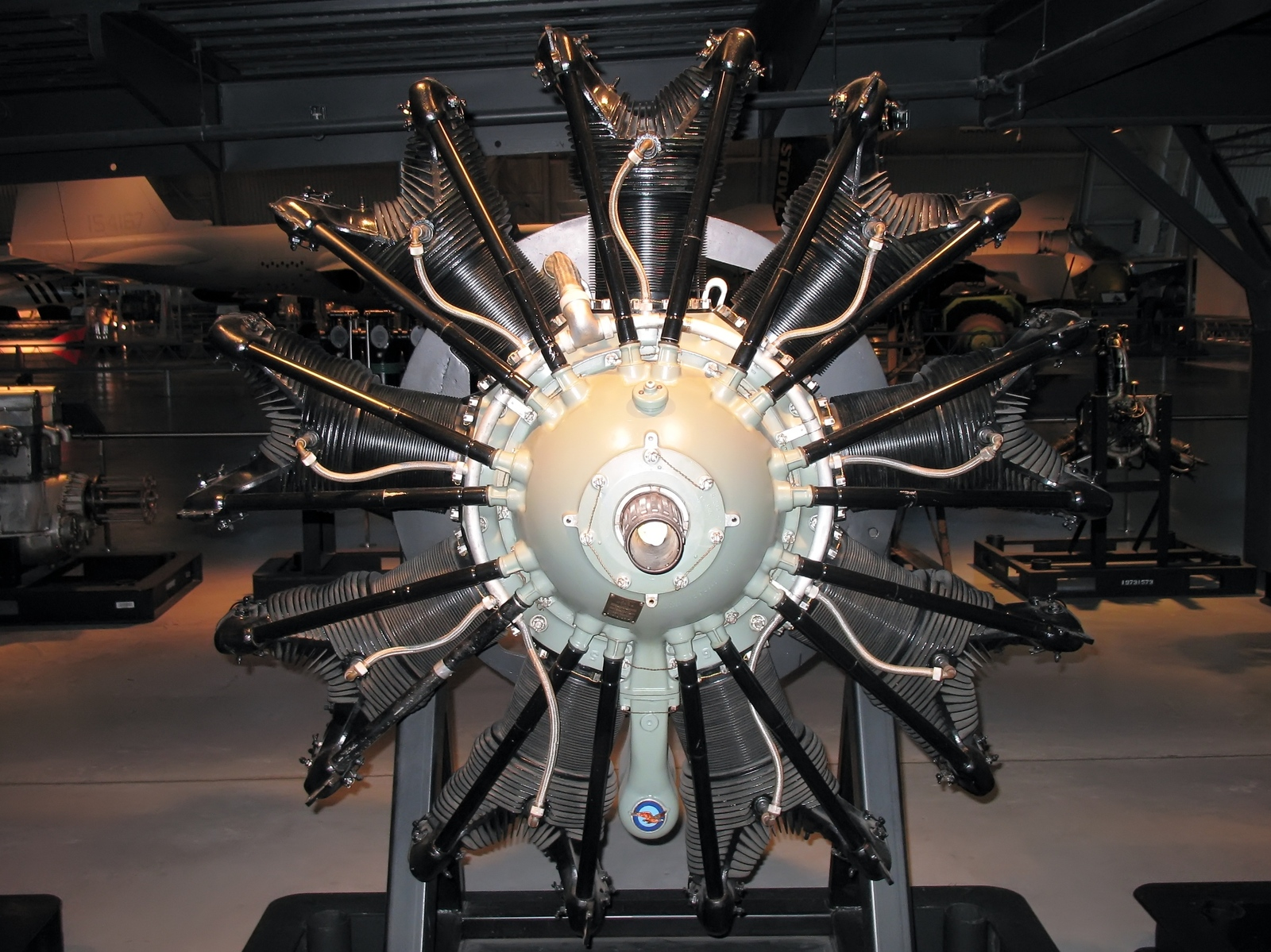
- Pratt & Whitney R-1860 Hornet B
- Type: Radial engine
- National origin: United States
- Manufacturer: Pratt & Whitney
- First run: 1929
- Major applications: Consolidated Fleetster; Keystone B-4; Sikorsky S-40; Sikorsky S-41
- Developed from: Pratt & Whitney R-1690

The Pratt & Whitney R-1860 Hornet B was a relatively uncommon aircraft engine. It was a development of Pratt & Whitney's earlier R-1690 Hornet and was basically similar, but enlarged in capacity from 1,690 to 1,860 cubic inches (30.5 L). Cylinder bore was increased by 1/8" and the crankshaft stroke by 3/8". Both engines were air-cooled radial engines, with a single row of nine cylinders.

== Design and development ==
The cylinder and valve design was typical for Pratt & Whitney, a simple design with two large valves driven by pushrods. The enlarged engine was designed by George Willgoos and was first available in 1929.

The Hornet series of engines was similar to the Wasp, but larger. In both series a nine-cylinder single-row engine was later supplemented by an enlarged fourteen cylinder engine, with two rows of the same cylinders, but reduced in number to seven per row to aid cooling to the rear row (it was never made into a larger, 18 cylinder radial like the related Wasp was).

Two of these engines, the enlarged single-row Hornet B described here and the R-1830 Twin Wasp, were of near-identical displacement (1860 vs. 1830), although the fourteen-cylinder Twin Wasp was more complex and costly than the nine-cylinder, single-row Hornet B. The Twin Wasp was by far the more powerful engine though, even in its early versions it produced 800 bhp to the Hornet B's 575 bhp. Having more cylinders per the same displacement also creates a smoother engine, since the individual pistons are smaller and lighter, and the stroke is shorter, which reduces the vibration of reciprocation, and therefore crew and mechanical fatigue. The reduced stroke also allows for a higher maximum RPM limit, since the mean piston speed is reduced, the distance the piston has to cover per each engine revolution being shorter. Having a shorter stroke but a higher rpm limit for the same displacement reduces the peak torque levels, but allows for a higher maximum horsepower rating. A further advantage was the reduced diameter of the Wasp: 48 inches compared to 57. This reduced drag, and the relatively large diameter of the Hornet would also have been a serious drawback for visibility if used in a small single-engined aircraft.

Although a technically competent design, the enlarged Hornet B engine was not a commercial success. Customers preferred to buy the R-1830 Twin Wasp instead, which in time became the most numerous aircraft engine ever produced.

== Applications ==
- Bellanca C-27 Airbus
- Boeing Monomail
- Boeing YB-9
- Consolidated Commodore
- Consolidated Fleetster
- Fokker F-32
- Keystone B-4A
- Keystone LB-8 (prototype only)
- Keystone XLB-12 (engine evaluation testbed only)
- Martin XT6M (prototype only)
- Sikorsky S-40
- Sikorsky S-41

== Specifications ==
Data from "Pratt & Whitney Hornet R-1860-B". Smithsonian National Air and Space Museum. and Aircraft Piston Engines by Herschel Smith

=== General characteristics ===
- Type: Nine-cylinder single-row supercharged air-cooled radial engine
- Bore: 6.25 in. (158.8 mm)
- Stroke: 6.75 in. (171.4 mm)
- Displacement: 1864 cuin (30.54 L)
- Length: 113.7 cm (44.78 in.)
- Diameter: 144.6 cm (56.93 in.)
- Dry weight: 376.4 kg (830 lb)

=== Components ===
- Valvetrain: Pushrod-actuated, two valves per cylinder
- Supercharger: Single-speed centrifugal type supercharger
- Cooling system: Air-cooled
- Reduction gear: Epicyclic gearing

=== Performance ===
- Power output: 575 hp (429 kW) at 1,950 rpm

== See also ==
Related development

- Pratt & Whitney R-1690 Hornet A
- Pratt & Whitney R-2180-A Twin Hornet

Comparable engines

- Bristol Pegasus
- Pratt & Whitney R-1830 Twin Wasp
- Wright R-1820 Cyclone 9

Related lists

- List of aircraft engines
