= Sikorsky S-36 =

Amphibian flying boat family

S-36
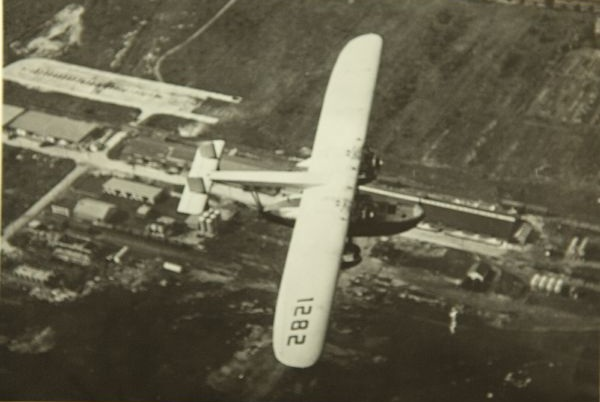

General information
- Type: Eight-seat amphibian
- National origin: United States
- Manufacturer: Sikorsky Aircraft
- Primary user: Pan American Airways
- Number built: 6

History
- Introduction date: 1927
- First flight: 1927
- Developed from: Sikorsky S-34
- Developed into: Sikorsky S-38

The Sikorsky S-36 was an eight-seat amphibian sesquiplane designed and built by the Sikorsky Manufacturing Company in the late 1920s. The aircraft was ordered by Pan American Airways, the start of a long association with Sikorsky flying boats.

== Development ==
The S-36 was a modified and larger version of the earlier S-34 and was designed as a commercial aircraft for six passengers or freight. It was an amphibian sesquiplane with a boat hull fuselage and retractable landing gear. It was powered by two Wright Whirlwind J-5 engines and had a crew of two and room for six passengers on two facing bench seats. Only six aircraft were built.

== Operational history ==
One aircraft named Dawn was sold to Mrs. Frances Grayson, a wealthy divorcee, for an attempt to be the first woman to fly across the Atlantic. As a passenger in Dawn and after two false starts, Grayson, with Brice Herbert Goldsborough (navigator), Oskar Omdal (pilot) and Fred Koehler (passenger) departed in the aircraft for the Atlantic attempt on 23 December 1927 but was not seen again. The weather was poor. The aircraft passed Cape Cod at 8 am, headed for Harbour Grace, Newfoundland. The last message from the aircraft before it disappeared was received by a radio station on Sable Island off the coast of Canada, consisting of the words "something's wrong here" with the aircraft's callsign. This resulted in the first-ever air relief expedition, including two destroyers and the dirigible USS Los Angeles. A message in a bottle was found on January 29, 1929; it read "1928, we are freezing. Gas leaked out. We are drifting off Grand Banks. Grayson." The aircraft and its occupants were never found.

The United States Navy bought one aircraft, designated the XPS-1, fitted with a gunner's position in the bow for evaluation as a patrol aircraft, although it was used as a transport.

The fourth aircraft was delivered to Pan American Airways in December 1927.

== Variants ==
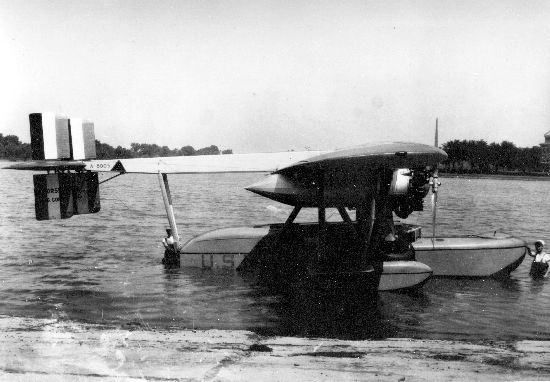
The XPS-1

S-36
Production aircraft, five built.
S-36B
Evaluation aircraft with Wright J-5 engines for the United States Navy as the XPS-1, one built.
XPS-1
One S-36B for evaluation by the United States Navy

== Operators ==
United States

- Pan American Airways
- United States Navy

== Specifications (S-36 production version) ==
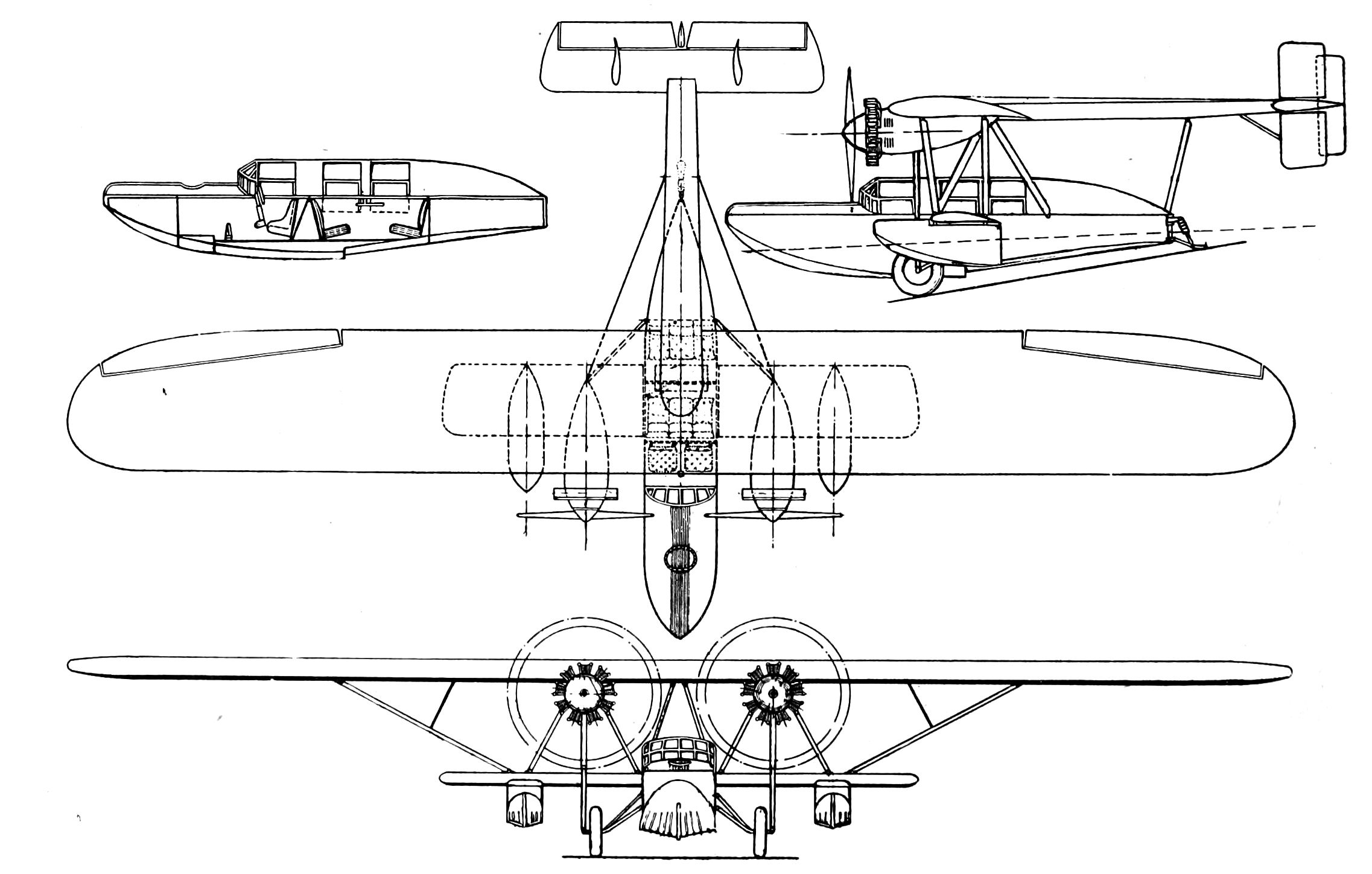
Sikorsky S-36B 3-view drawing from Aero Digest September 1927

Data from

General characteristics

- Crew: two
- Capacity: six passengers
- Length: 34 ft 0 in (10.36 m)
- Wingspan: 62 ft 0 in (18.9 m)
- Height: 12 ft 0 in (3.66 m)
- Wing area: 585 sq ft (54.35 m^{2})
- Empty weight: 3,950 lb (1,792 kg)
- Gross weight: 6,000 lb (2,722 kg)
- Powerplant: 2 × Wright Whirlwind radial engine , 200 hp (149 kW) each

Performance

- Maximum speed: 120 mph (193 km/h, 100 kn)
- Service ceiling: 15,000 ft (4,572 m)
- Rate of climb: 600 ft/min (3.05 m/s)

== See also ==
Related lists

- List of flying boats and floatplanes
