= Boeing YB-9 =

Prototype bomber aircraft by Boeing

YB-9
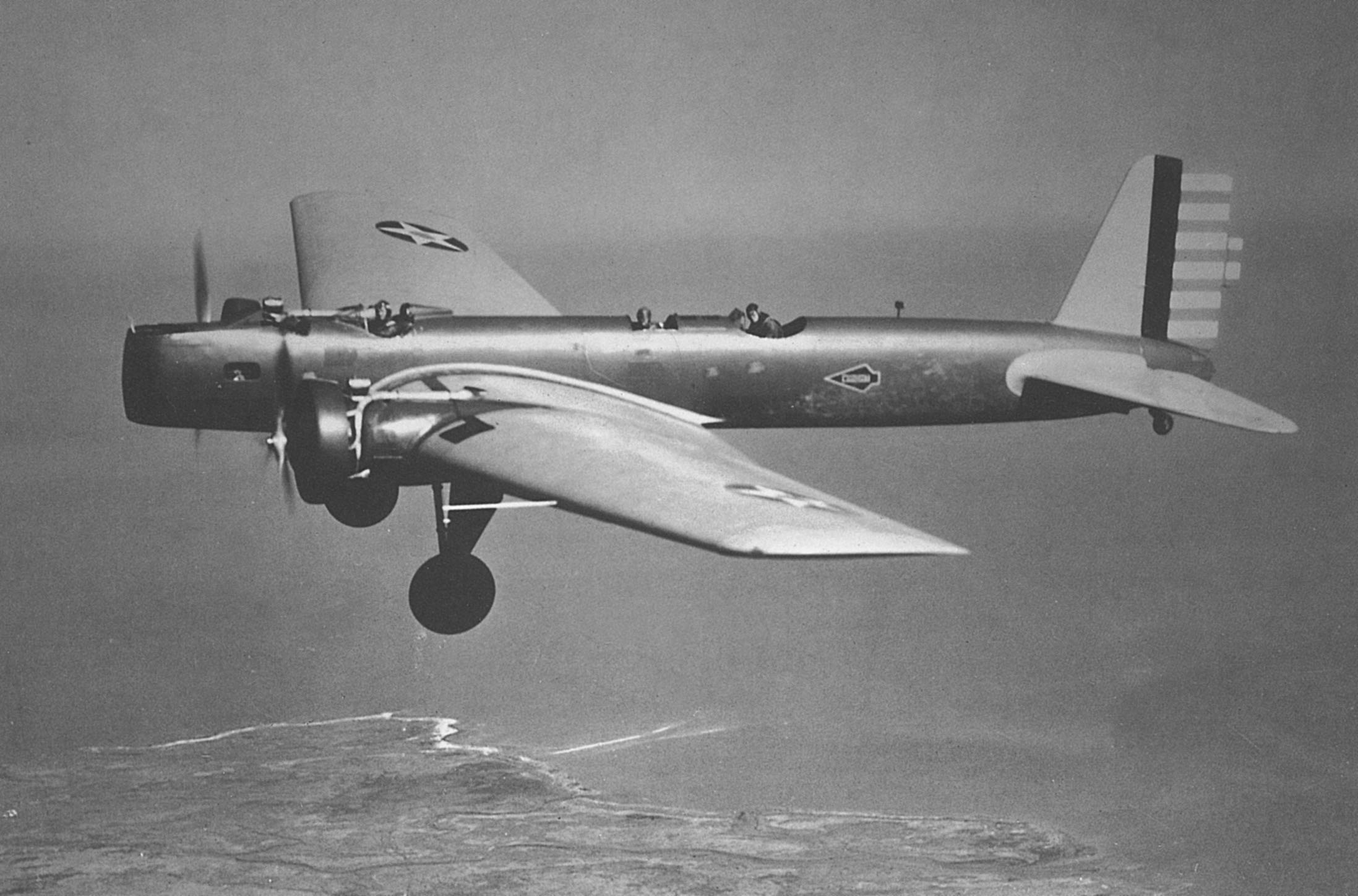
- Boeing Y1B-9 test flight, 1932, with its retractable landing gear extended

General information
- Type: Bomber aircraft
- Manufacturer: Boeing
- Status: No surviving examples
- Primary user: United States Army Air Corps
- Number built: 7

History
- Manufactured: 1930–1933
- Introduction date: 5 November 1931
- First flight: 13 April 1931
- Retired: 1935

The Boeing YB-9 was the first all-metal monoplane bomber aircraft designed for the United States Army Air Corps. The YB-9 was a much enlarged twin-engine development of Boeing's single-engine Model 200 Monomail commercial transport. Only small numbers were built as prototypes, but these entered service starting in September 1932 and were used until early 1935. No serial production was started.

== Design and development ==
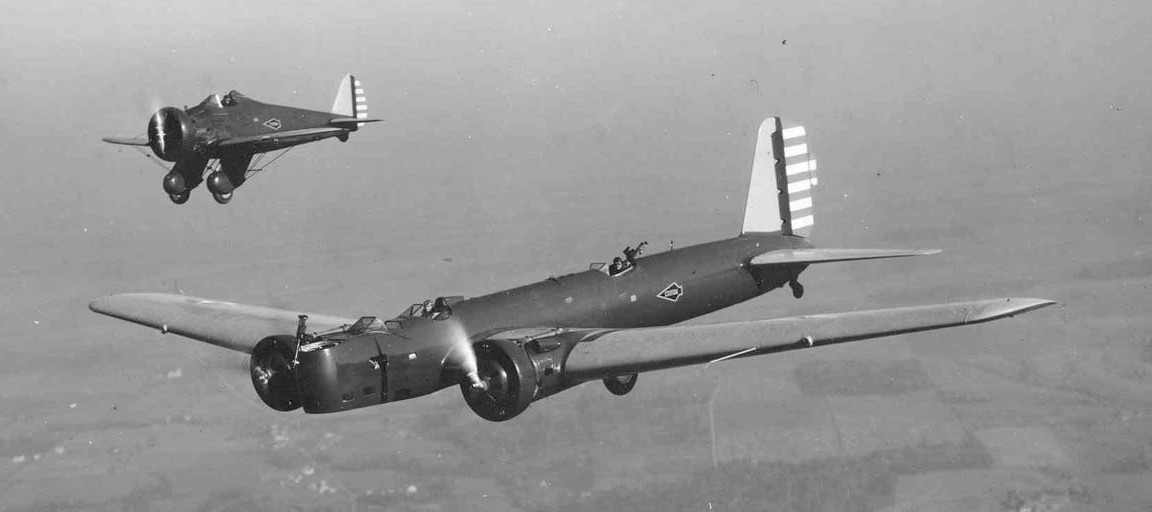
Boeing Y1B-9A in flight with a P-26 fighter.

In May 1930, Boeing had flown its Model 200 Monomail single-engined mailplane. The Monomail was of radical design for the time, being a semi-monocoque, stressed skin cantilever monoplane with a retractable undercarriage. Air Corps bomber squadrons of the day were largely equipped with slow strut-braced biplanes built from steel-tube frames covered in doped fabric, such as the Keystone B-6, and Boeing decided to design and build a twin-engined bomber using the same techniques used in the Monomail to re-equip the Air Corps.

Boeing built two prototypes of a new bomber as a private venture, which differed in the engines used, with the Model 214 powered by two liquid-cooled Curtiss V-1570-29 Conqueror engines while the Model 215 had two Pratt & Whitney R-1860 Hornet B radial engines. Both aircraft were low winged cantilever monoplanes with a slim, oval cross-section fuselage accommodating a crew of five. The pilot and co-pilot sat in separate open cockpits, with the co-pilot, who doubled as the bombardier sitting forward of the pilot. Two gunners, each armed with a single machine gun sat in nose and dorsal positions, while a radio operator sat inside the fuselage. Like the Monomail, a retractable tailwheel undercarriage was used.

The first of the two prototypes to fly was the radial powered Model 215 which, carrying civil markings and the aircraft registration X-10633, made its first flight on 13 April 1931. It was leased to the Air Corps for testing under the designation XB-901, demonstrating a speed of 163 mph (262 km/h). Testing was successful, and both the XB-901 and the as-yet incomplete Model 214 were purchased as the YB-9 and Y1B-9 respectively on 13 August 1931, with an order for a further five for service testing following.

The Y1B-9 (Y1 indicating funding outside normal fiscal year procurement), powered by two liquid-cooled Curtiss V-1570-29 'Conqueror' engines, first flew on 5 November 1931. The increased power from these engines, combined with improved streamlining of the engine nacelles, increased its top speed to 173 mph (278 km/h). The YB-9, meanwhile, had been re-engined with more powerful Hornet Bs, demonstrating slightly better performance than the Y1B-9, which was therefore also re-engined with Hornet Bs.

The five Y1B-9A service test aircraft (Boeing Model 246) had the Pratt & Whitney R-1860-11 Hornet B engines which powered the re-engined YB-9 and Y1B-9 and a redesigned vertical stabilizer modeled on the 247D transport. While enclosed canopies were considered and designed, the B-9 was never fitted with them. Although it equaled the speed of existing American fighter aircraft, no further aircraft were built, as the Glenn L. Martin Company had flown a prototype of a more advanced bomber, the XB-907, which was ordered into production as the Martin B-10.

== Operational history ==
The first of the five Y1B-9As entered service with the 20th and 49th Bombardment Squadrons, 2nd Bomb Group on 14 September 1932, with all examples built being in service by the end of March 1933. The new bomber proved impossible to intercept during air exercises in May 1932, strengthening calls for improved air defense warning systems. Two B-9s were destroyed during crashes in 1933, one of the accidents being fatal, while the remaining aircraft were gradually phased out over the next two years, with the last being withdrawn on 26 April 1935.

== Variants ==
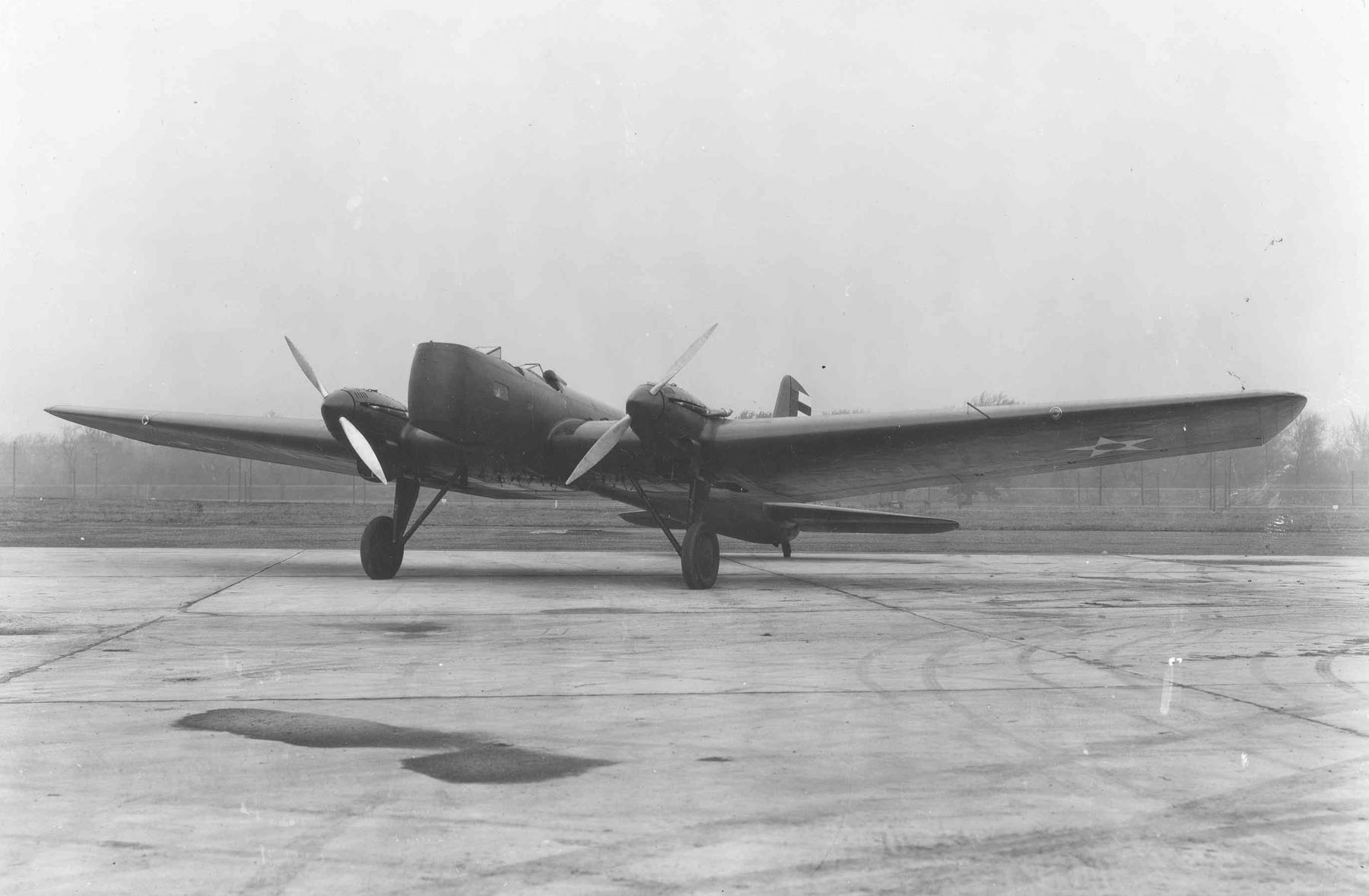
Boeing Y1B-9 with original Curtiss Conqueror liquid-cooled engines

- YB-9 (one produced). Pratt & Whitney R-1860-13 Hornet B (575 hp or 429 kW). Reengined with supercharged Pratt & Whitney R-1860-11 Hornet B (600 hp or 450 kW) and was fitted with three-bladed propellers. Trim tab ran the full height of the rudder

Boeing model B-215
contract number: XB-901

- Y1B-9 (one produced). Curtiss GIV-1570 Conqueror (Curtis V-1570-29 Conqueror) (600 hp). Reengined with supercharged Pratt & Whitney R-1860-11 Hornet B (600 hp) and was fitted with three-bladed propellers. Short trim tab on rudder.

Boeing model B-214

- Y1B-9A (five produced). Pratt & Whitney R-1860-11 Hornet B (Y1G1SR-1860B) (600 hp). Metal instead of fabric covering on the control surfaces. There were also many internal structural and equipment changes

Boeing model B-246

- B-9B (not built). Proposed development of Y1B-9A with minor changes.

Boeing model B-276

== Operators ==
United States

- United States Army Air Corps

== Specifications (Y1B-9A) ==
Data from United States Military Aircraft since 1909

General characteristics

- Crew: four
- Length: 52 ft 0 in (15.85 m)
- Wingspan: 76 ft 10 in (23.42 m)
- Height: 12 ft 0 in (3.66 m)
- Wing area: 954 sq ft (88.6 m^{2})
- Empty weight: 8,941 lb (4,056 kg)
- Max takeoff weight: 14,320 lb (6,495 kg)
- Powerplant: 2 × Pratt & Whitney R-1860-11 Hornet B radial engine, 600 hp (450 kW) each

Performance

- Maximum speed: 188 mph (303 km/h, 163 kn) at 6,000 ft (1,800 m)
- Cruise speed: 165 mph (266 km/h, 143 kn)
- Range: 540 mi (870 km, 470 nmi)
- Service ceiling: 20,750 ft (6,320 m)
- Rate of climb: 900 ft/min (4.6 m/s)

Armament

- Guns: 2 × .30 in (7.62 mm) machine guns
- Bombs: 2,260 lb (1,030 kg) bombs

== See also ==
Related development

- Boeing Monomail

Aircraft of comparable role, configuration, and era

- Martin B-10
- Tupolev TB-3

Related lists

- List of bomber aircraft
- List of military aircraft of the United States
