= Earth inductor compass =

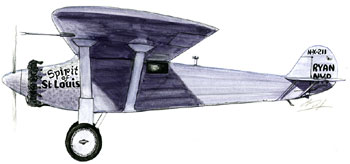
The anemometer of the earth inductor compass on the Spirit of St. Louis shows as a small "T" shape above the fuselage behind the wing

The Earth inductor compass (or simply induction compass) is a compass that determines directions using the principle of electromagnetic induction, with the Earth's magnetic field acting as the induction field for an electric generator. The electrical output of the generator will vary depending on its orientation with respect to the Earth's magnetic field. This variation in the generated voltage is measured, allowing the Earth inductor compass to determine direction.

== History ==
The earth inductor compass was first patented by Donald M. Bliss in 1912 and further refined in the 1920s by Paul R. Heyl and Lyman James Briggs of the United States National Bureau of Standards, and in 1924 by Morris Titterington at the Pioneer Instrument Company in Brooklyn, New York. Heyl and Briggs were awarded the Magellan Medal of the American Philosophical Society for this work in 1922. Designed to compensate for the weaknesses of the magnetic compass, the Earth inductor compass provided pilots with a more stable and reliable reference instrument. They were used in the Douglas World Cruisers in 1924 during the Around-the-World flight by the U.S. Army Air Corps. Charles Lindbergh used the compass on his transatlantic flight in the Spirit of St. Louis in 1927. Over the transatlantic leg of his voyage – a distance of about 2,000 miles (3,200 km) – he was able to navigate with a cumulative error of about 10 miles (16 km) in landfall, or about one half of one percent of the distance travelled, by computing his heading at hourly intervals for a dead reckoning estimate of position.

== Operation ==
Bliss' original design consisted of two armatures spinning on a single vertical axle. One armature was connected to commutators that were 90 degrees offset from the commutators connected to the other armature. When one set of commutators is aligned with the earth's magnetic field no current is produced, but an offset angle creates a positive or negative current in proportion to the sine of the offset angle. Since the sine of the angle peaks at 90 degrees, a reading could indicate either a certain direction or the exact opposite direction. The solution to this was a second armature with commutators offset by 90 degrees to help distinguish the two opposite directions.

The direction of travel was read by comparing the indications on two independent galvanometers, one for each armature. The galvanometers had to be calibrated with the correct headings, since the voltage was proportional to the sine of the angle. Readings could be impacted by the armature's speed of rotation and by stray magnetic fields.

Later versions simplified readings to show the offset from the intended heading, rather than the full range of compass directions. The revised design allowed the user to rotate the commutators in such a way that zero current would be produced when the craft was traveling in the intended direction. A single galvanometer was then used to show if the pilot was steering too far to the left or to the right.

Lindbergh's compass used an anemometer to spin the armature through a universal joint. The armature was mounted on gimbals to prevent it from tilting with the airplane's pitch and roll. Tilting the armature could have changed the angle of the Earth's flux to the armature, resulting in erroneous readings. The gyroscopic effect of the spinning armature also helped to keep it properly aligned.

== Patents ==
- US granted 1047157, Bliss, Donald M, "Device for Determining Direction", issued 1912-12-17, assigned to Henschel, Charles J
- US granted 1840911, N. Minorsky, "Induction compass", published 1932-01-12, assigned to N. Minorsky
- US granted 2434324, Lehde, Henry, "Earth inductor compass", issued 1948-01-13, assigned to Control Instrument Company Inc.
- GB granted 314786, Vion, Eugene, "Improvements in electro-magnetic apparatus for the observation and correction of travel of aerial and marine craft", issued 1929-12-23
