= Sikorsky S-39 =

American light amphibious aircraft

S-39
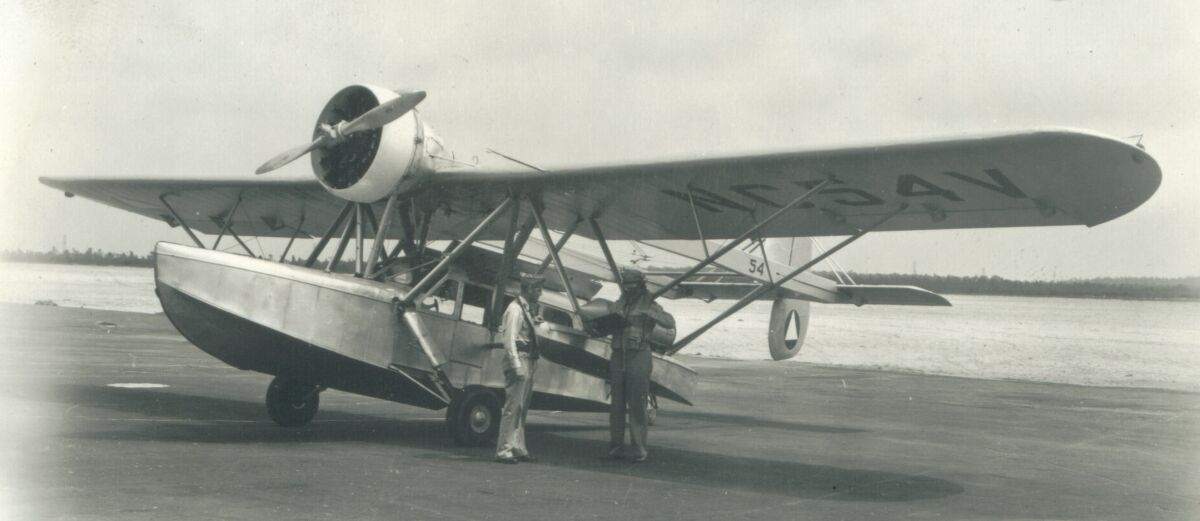
- Sikorsky S-39 of the Civil Air Patrol, 1942

General information
- Type: Flying boat
- National origin: United States
- Manufacturer: Sikorsky Aircraft
- Number built: 21

History
- First flight: 24 December 1929; 95 years ago

The Sikorsky S-39 is an American light amphibious aircraft produced by Sikorsky Aircraft during the early 1930s. The S-39 was a smaller, single-engine version of the S-38.

== Operational history ==
=== Spirit of Africa ===
Filmmakers Martin and Osa Johnson used a giraffe-patterned S-39 Spirit of Africa, with companion zebra-striped S-38 Osa's Ark, to explore Africa extensively, making safari movies and books.

=== Military usage ===
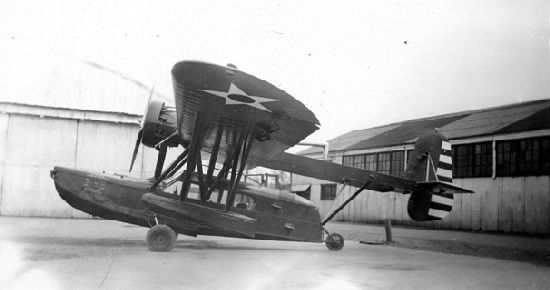
The C-28

One example of the S-39 was acquired by the United States Army Air Corps in 1932, given the designation Y1C-28. It was evaluated for use in coastal patrol and light transport roles; in 1934 it was redesignated C-28 and assigned as a liaison aircraft to the United States Military Academy.

At least one S-39 saw service with the Civil Air Patrol Coastal Patrol from 1942 to 1943. This was part of a fleet of civilian aircraft flown by volunteers along the Atlantic and Gulf Coasts, searching for both German submarines and for allied ships in distress. Seaplanes such as the S-39 were sometimes used for search and rescue if another aircraft crashed or went missing. A surviving CAP S-39, previously based at Rehoboth Beach, Delaware, is currently on display at the New England Air Museum.

=== Yacht ===
Edward A. Deeds had the yacht Lotosland designed to incorporate aircraft capability. After loss of the planned aircraft on first loading Deeds ordered an S-39-A replacement the next day. The aircraft was intended to allow Deeds to quickly travel from his yacht to business and events ashore.

== Variants ==
S-39-A
4-seat version
S-39-B
Improved 5-seat version of the S-39-A
S-39-C
Converted from S-39-B
C-28
One example of the S-39 acquired by the United States Army Air Corps

== Surviving aircraft ==
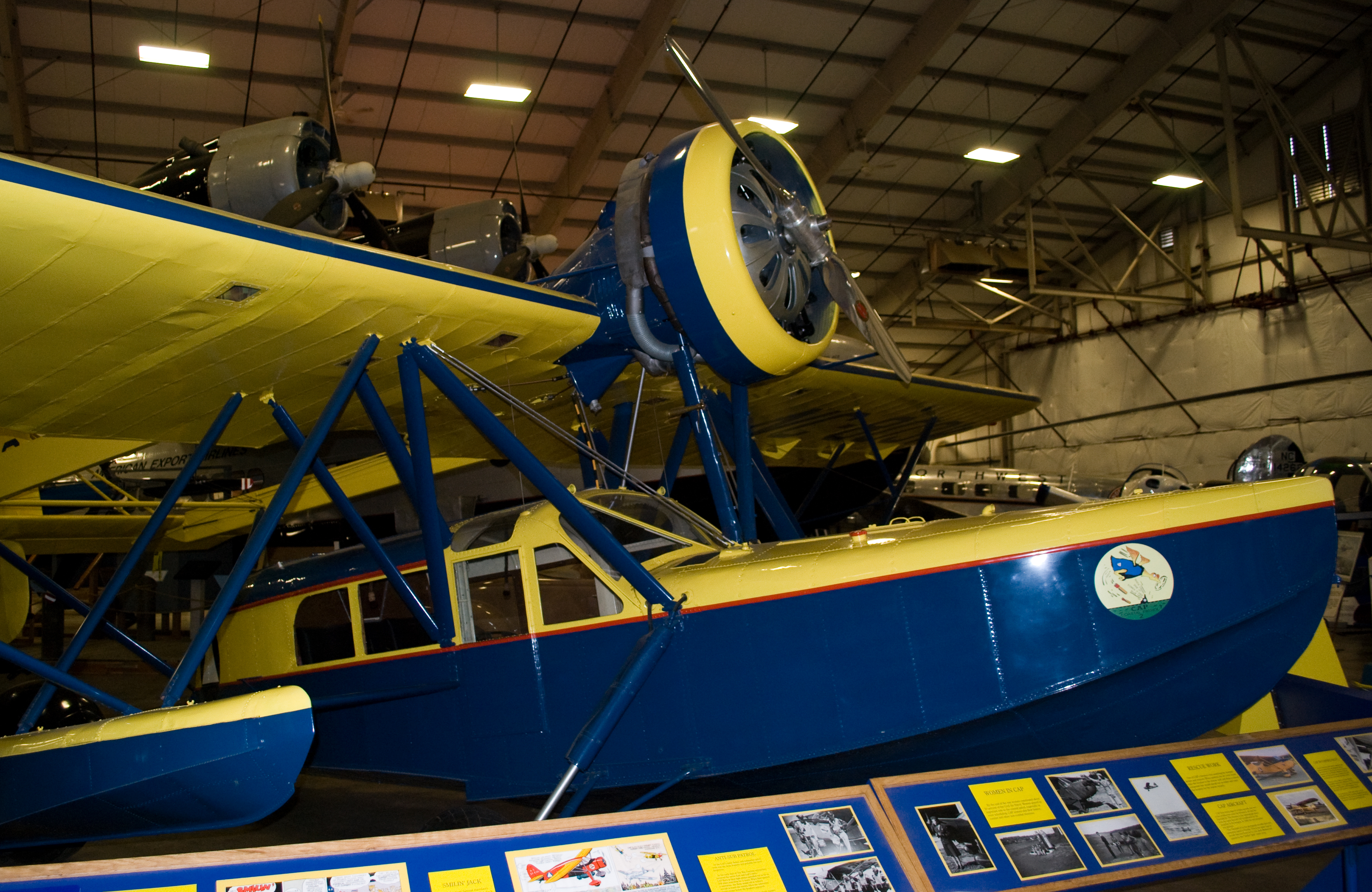
Sikorsky S-39-B

- 904 – S-39-B on static display at the New England Air Museum in Windsor Locks, Connecticut.
- Composite – S-39-C airworthy with at Fantasy of Flight in Polk City, Florida. It was recovered from Alaska in 1965 and incorporated parts of five S-39s. It was restored by Dick Jackson and first flew in 2003.
- 920 – S-39-C under restoration with Frederick W. Patterson III of American Canyon, California. This is the last S-39 produced and was originally owned by Shell Eastern, the original name of the Shell Oil Company.

== Specifications (S-39A) ==
Data from Aerofiles : Sikorsky, American flying boats and amphibious aircraft : an illustrated history

General characteristics

- Crew: 1 or 2
- Capacity: 4 or 5 pax / 1,145–1,300 lb (519–590 kg) payload
- Length: 31 ft 11 in (9.73 m)
- Wingspan: 52 ft 0 in (15.85 m)
- Wing area: 320 sq ft (30 m^{2})
- Airfoil: Sikorsky GS-1
- Empty weight: 2,678 lb (1,215 kg)
- Gross weight: 4,000 lb (1,814 kg)
- Powerplant: 1 × Pratt & Whitney R-985 Wasp Junior 9-cylinder air-cooled radial piston engine, 300 hp (220 kW)

Performance

- Maximum speed: 115 mph (185 km/h, 100 kn)
- Cruise speed: 97 mph (156 km/h, 84 kn)
- Stall speed: 54 mph (87 km/h, 47 kn)
- Range: 375 mi (604 km, 326 nmi)
