= Amphibious aircraft =

Aircraft able to land / take off from both land and water

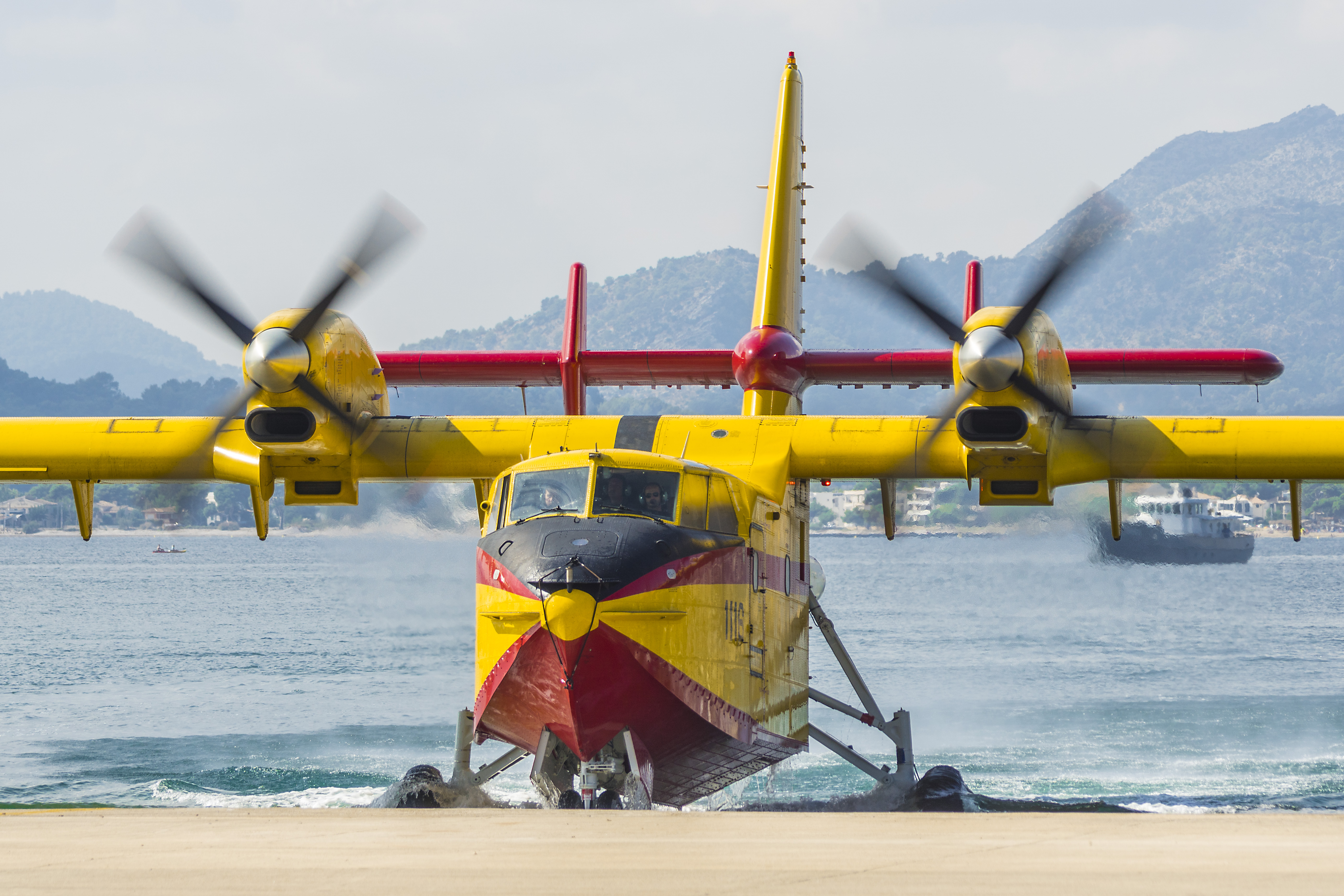
A Canadair CL-415 amphibian with retractable wheels

An amphibious aircraft, or amphibian, is an aircraft that can take off and land on both solid ground and water. These aircraft are typically fixed-wing, though amphibious helicopters do exist as well. Fixed-wing amphibious aircraft are seaplanes (flying boats and floatplanes) which are equipped with retractable wheels, at the expense of extra weight and complexity, plus diminished range and fuel economy compared with planes designed specifically for land-only or water-only operation.

== Design ==
Floatplanes often have floats that are interchangeable with wheeled landing gear (thereby producing a conventional land-based aircraft). However, in cases where this is not practical, amphibious floatplanes, such as the amphibious version of the DHC Otter, incorporate retractable wheels within their floats. Some amphibians are fitted with reinforced keels which act as skis, allowing them to land on snow or ice with their wheels up.

Many amphibian aircraft are of the flying boat type. These aircraft, and those designed as floatplanes with a single main float under the fuselage centerline (such as the Loening OL and Grumman J2F), require outrigger floats to provide lateral stability so as to avoid dipping a wingtip, which can destroy an aircraft if it happens at speed, or can cause the wingtip to fill with water and sink if stationary. While these impose weight and drag, amphibious aircraft also face the possibility of these getting hit when operating from a runway. A common solution is to make them retractable, like those found on the Consolidated Catalina; however, these are even heavier than fixed floats. Some aircraft may have the tip floats removed for extended use from land. Other amphibians, such as the Dornier Seastar, use stub wings, called sponsons, mounted with their own lower surfaces nearly even with the ventral "boat-hull"-shaped fuselage surface. This can provide the needed stability, while floatplane amphibians usually avoid the problem by dividing their buoyancy requirements between two floats, much like a catamaran.

Some non-amphibious seaplanes may be mistaken for amphibians (such as the Shin Meiwa PS-1) which carry their own beaching gear. Usually, this is a wheeled dolly or temporary set of wheels used to move a flying boat or floatplane from the water and allow it to be moved around on land. It can also appear as a conventional undercarriage. These are not built to take the impact of the aircraft landing on them. An amphibian can leave the water without anyone getting in the water to attach beaching wheels (or even having to have any handy), yet a fully functional undercarriage is heavy and impacts the aircraft's performance, and is not required in all cases, so an aircraft may be designed to carry its own.

== Hazards ==
An occasional problem with amphibians is with ensuring that the wheels are in the correct position for landing. In normal operation, the pilot uses a checklist, verifying each item. Since amphibians can land with them up or down though, the pilot must take extra care to ensure that they are correct for the chosen landing place. Landing wheels-up on land may damage the keel (unless done on wet grass, a technique occasionally used by pilots of pure flying boats), while landing wheels-down on water will almost always flip the aircraft upside down, causing substantial damage.

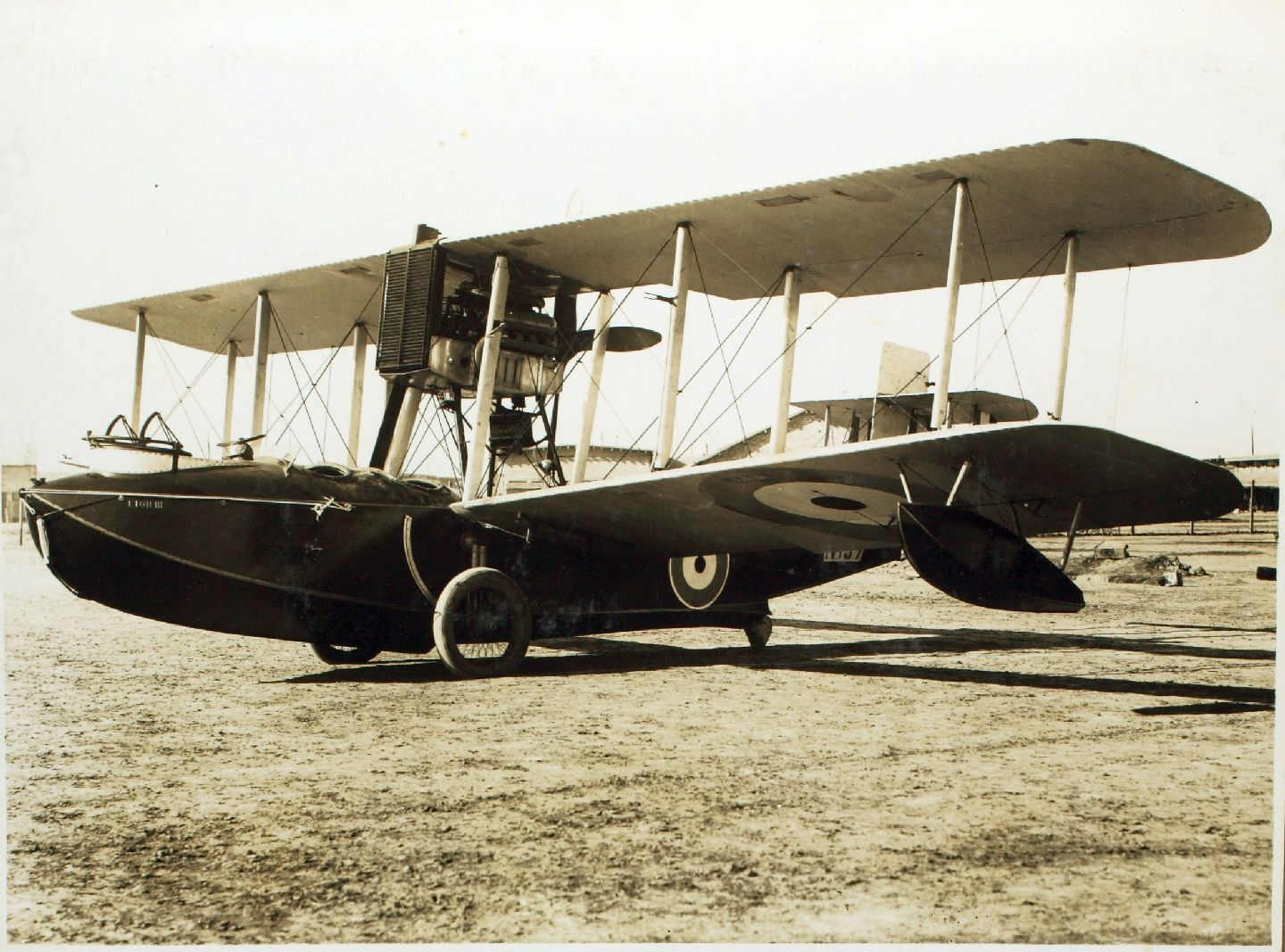
Vickers Viking - an early amphibian.

== Usage ==
Amphibious aircraft are heavier and slower, more complex and more expensive to purchase and operate than comparable landplanes. However, they are also more versatile. Even though they cannot hover or land vertically, they compete favorably with helicopters for some jobs and can do so at a significantly lower cost. Amphibious aircraft can also be much faster and have a longer range than comparable helicopters, and can achieve nearly the range of land-based aircraft, because an airplane's wing is more efficient than a helicopter's lifting rotor. This makes amphibious aircraft, such as the Grumman Albatross and the Shin Meiwa US-2, useful for long-range air–sea rescue tasks. In addition, amphibious aircraft are particularly useful as bush planes that can engage in light transport in remote areas. In these areas, they often have to operate not only from airstrips, but from lakes and rivers as well.

== History ==
In the United Kingdom, traditionally a maritime nation, a large number of amphibians were built between the wars, starting from 1918 with the Vickers Viking and the early 1920s Supermarine Seagull, and were used for exploration and military duties, including search and rescue, artillery spotting and anti-submarine patrol. These evolved throughout the interwar period to culminate in the post–World War II Supermarine Seagull, which was to have replaced the wartime Walrus and the Sea Otter but was overtaken by advances in helicopters.

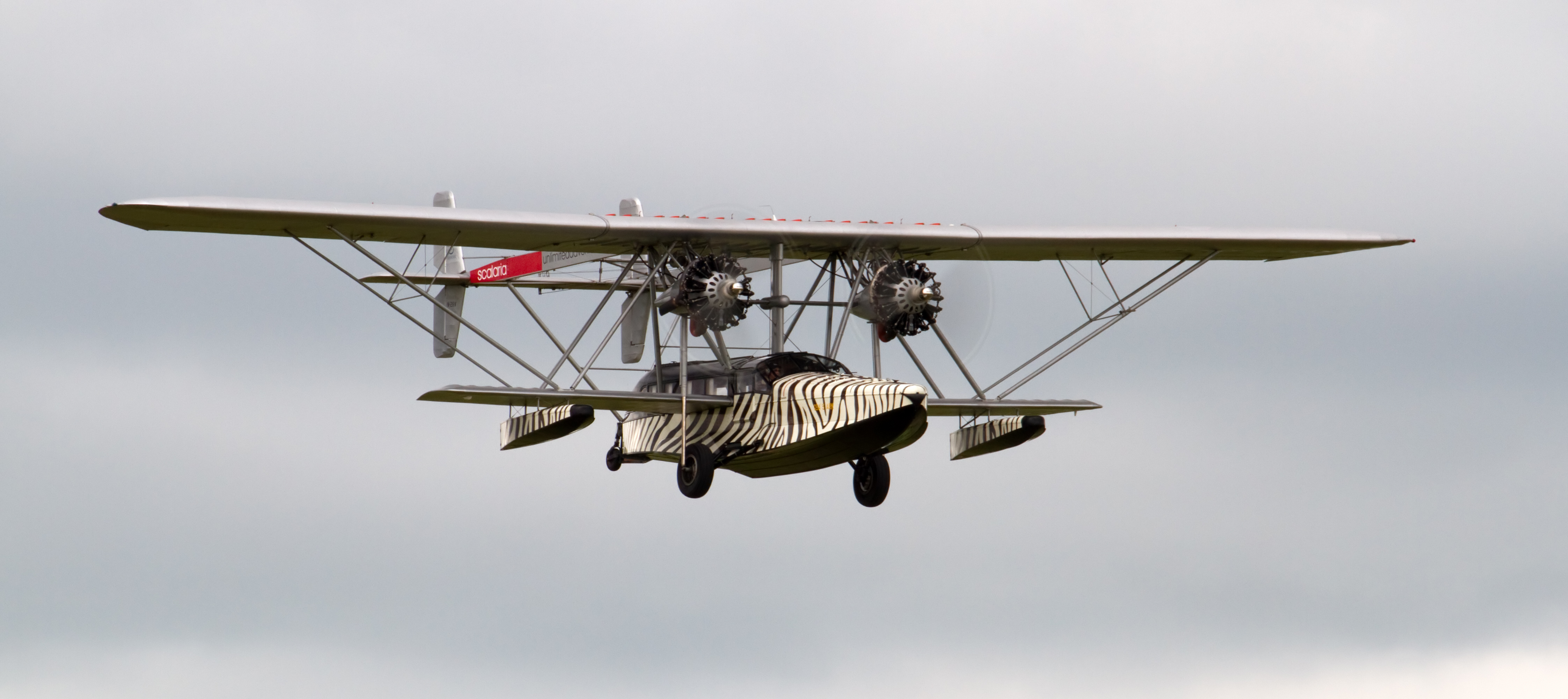
Replica of Osa's Ark - a Sikorsky S-38 used to explore Africa in the 1930s.

From the mid-1920s to the late 1930s in the United States, Sikorsky produced an extensive family of amphibians (the S-34, S-36, S-38, S-39, S-41, S-43) that were widely used for exploration and as airliners around the globe, helping pioneer many overseas air routes where the larger flying boats could not go, and helping to popularize amphibians in the US. The Grumman Corporation, latecomers to the game, introduced a pair of light utility amphibious aircraft – the Goose and the Widgeon – during the late 1930s for the civilian market. However, their military potential could not be ignored, and many were ordered by the US Armed forces and their allies during World War II. Not coincidentally, the Consolidated Catalina (named for Santa Catalina Island off the coast of southern California, whose resort was popularized partly by the use of amphibians in the 1930s, including Sikorskys and Douglas Dolphins) was redeveloped from being a pure flying boat into an amphibian during the war. After the war, the United States military ordered hundreds of the Grumman Albatross and its variants for a variety of roles. However, like the pure flying boat, they were made obsolete by helicopters which could operate in sea conditions far beyond what the best seaplane could manage.

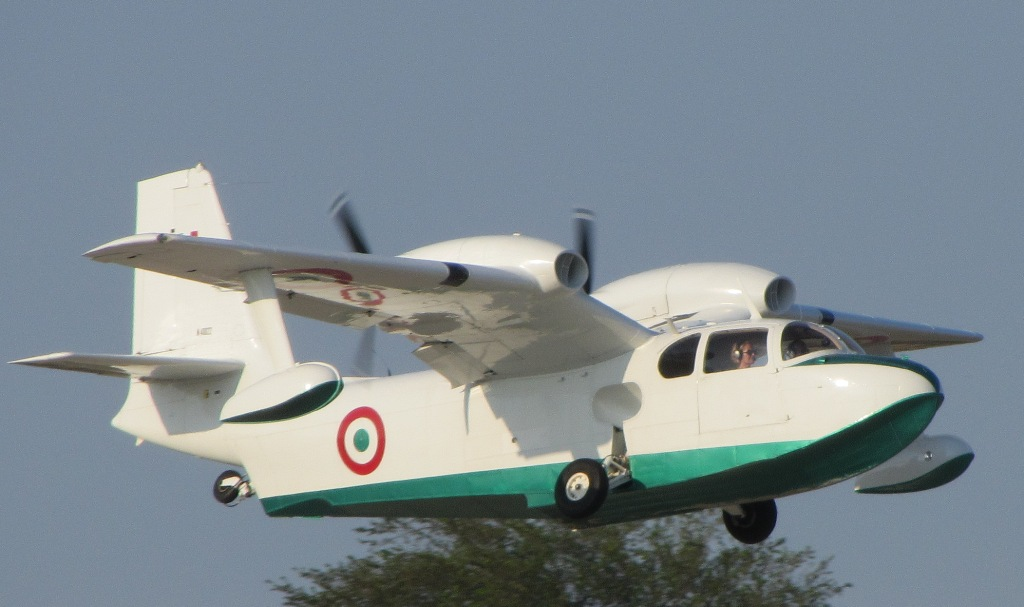
Italian Air Force Piaggio P.136 during takeoff, retracting the wheels that make it an amphibian.

Development of amphibians was not limited to the United Kingdom and the United States. In any case, few designs saw more than limited service, as there was a widespread preference for pure flying boats and floatplanes, due to the weight penalty the undercarriage imposed. Russia also developed a number of important flying boats, including the widely used pre-war Shavrov Sh-2 utility flying boat, and postwar the Beriev Be-12 anti-submarine and maritime patrol amphibian. Development of amphibians continues in Russia with the jet-engined Beriev Be-200. Italy, bordering the Mediterranean and Adriatic, has had a long history of waterborne aircraft, going back to the first Italian aircraft to fly. While most were not amphibians, quite a few were, including the Savoia-Marchetti S.56A and the Piaggio P.136.

Amphibious aircraft have been particularly useful in the unforgiving terrain of Alaska and northern Canada, where many remain in civilian service, providing remote communities with vital links to the outside world. The Canadian Vickers Vedette was developed for forestry patrol in remote areas; a job that previously was done by canoe and took weeks could be accomplished in hours, revolutionizing forestry conservation. Although successful, flying-boat amphibians like the Vedette ultimately proved less versatile than floatplane amphibians and are no longer as common as they once were. Amphibious floats that could be attached to any aircraft were developed, turning any aircraft into an amphibian, and these continue to be essential for getting into the more remote locations during the summer months when the only areas suitable for landing are the waterways.

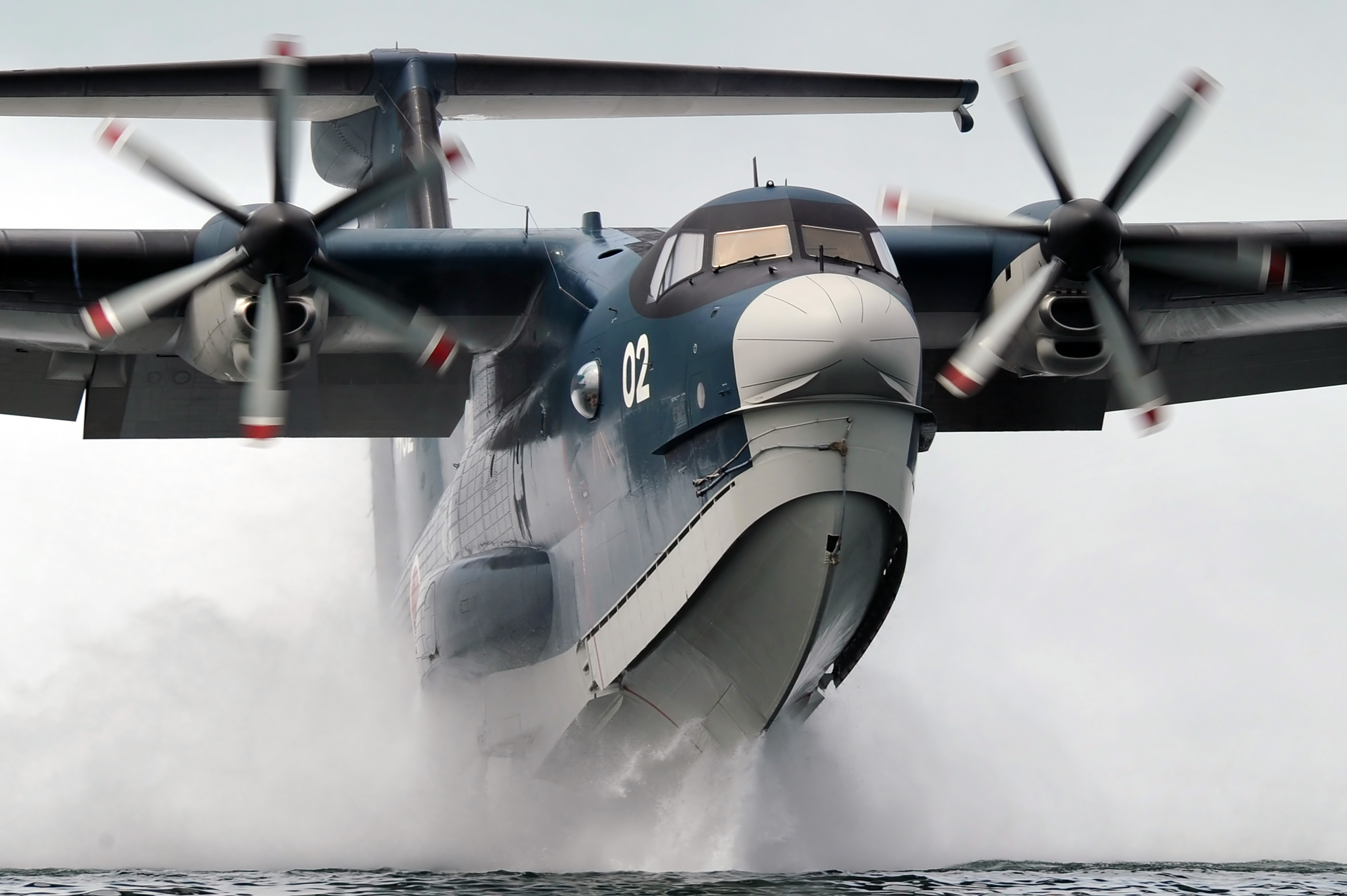
ShinMaywa US-2, developed in the 2000s in Japan from the older Shin Meiwa US-1A

Despite the gains of amphibious floats, small flying-boat amphibians continued to be developed into the 1960s, with the Republic Seabee and Lake LA-4 series proving popular, though neither was a commercial success due to factors beyond their makers' control. Many today are homebuilts, by necessity as the demand is too small to justify the costs of development, with the Volmer Sportsman being a popular choice among the many offerings.

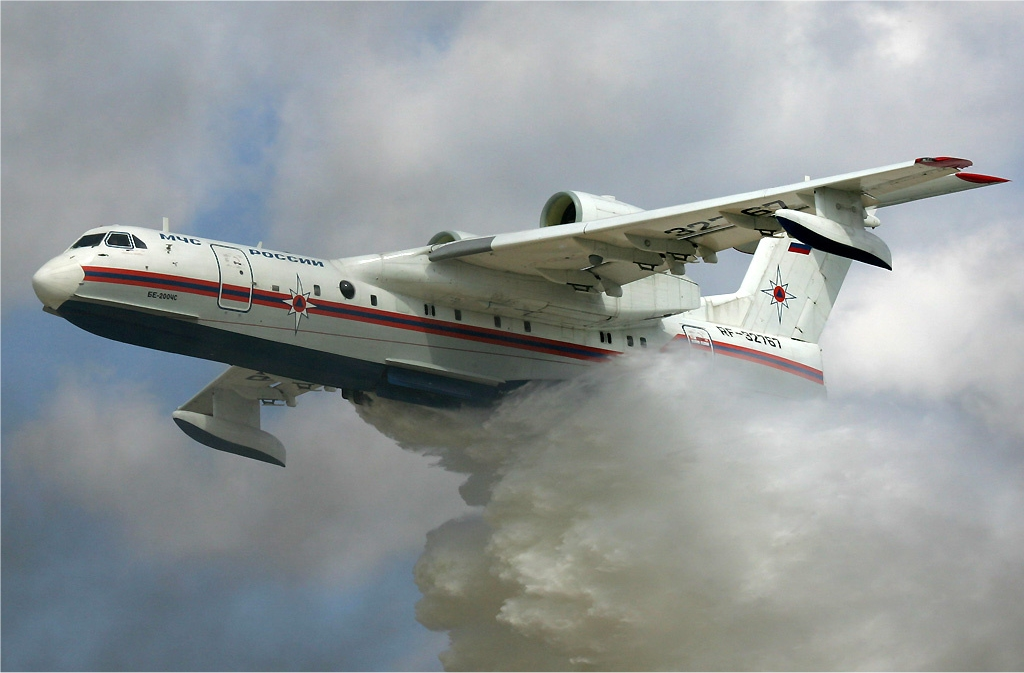
Beriev Be-200 operating as a waterbomber

With the increased availability of airstrips in remote communities, fewer amphibious aircraft are manufactured today than in the past, although a handful of amphibious aircraft are still produced, such as the Bombardier 415, ICON A5, and the amphibious-float–equipped version of the Cessna Caravan.

Development of amphibians has continued into the new millennium. The ShinMaywa US-2 was developed in the 2000s in Japan for the Japan Maritime Self-Defense Force.

== See also ==
- Amphibious helicopter
- Amphibious vehicle
- List of flying boats and floatplanes
- Floatplane
- Flying boat
- Flying submarine
- Seaplane
- Tigerfish Aviation (retractable float)
- Unmanned aerial vehicle
