= Consolidated Fleetster =

American 1920s monoplane

Fleetster
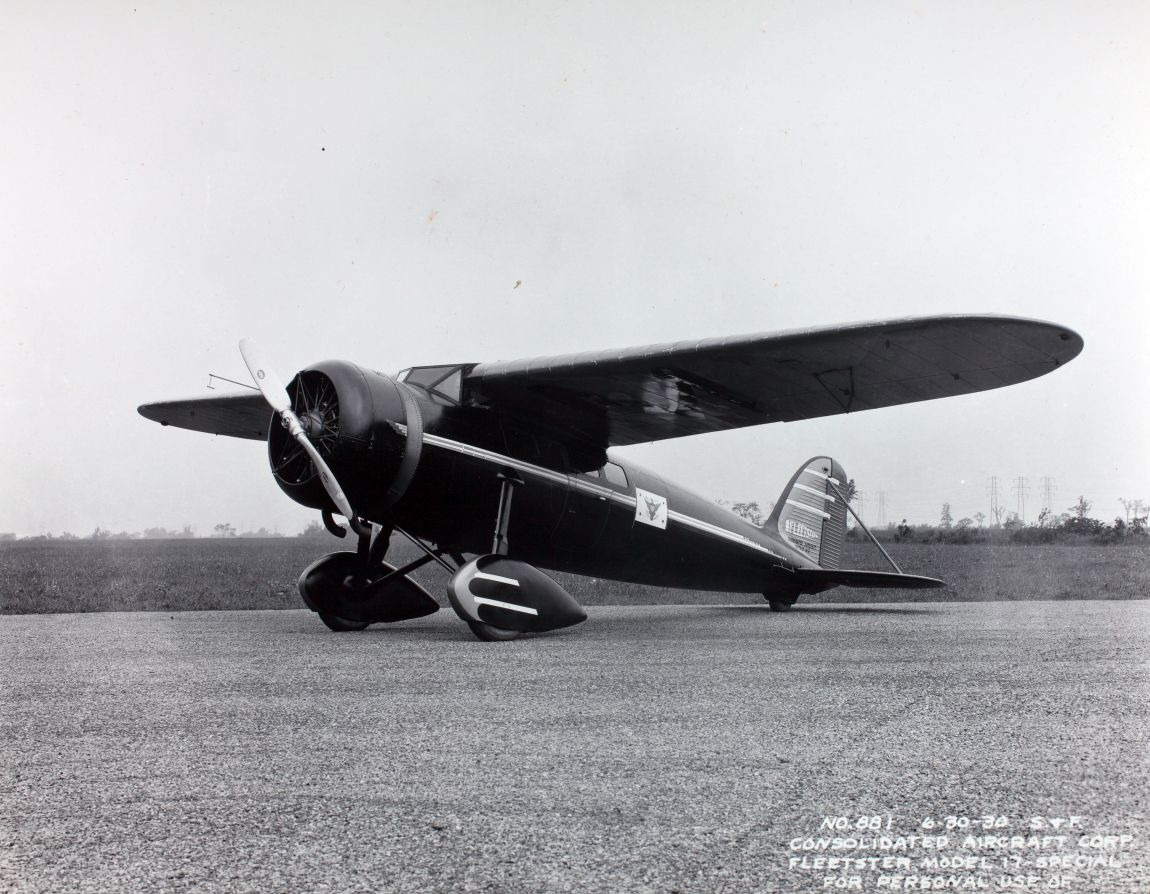
- The U.S. Army's Y1C-11 in 1930

General information
- Type: Light transport
- Manufacturer: Consolidated Aircraft Corporation
- Number built: 26

History
- First flight: 27 October 1929

The Consolidated Model 17 Fleetster was a 1920s American light transport monoplane aircraft built by the Consolidated Aircraft Corporation. There were several closely related types the Model 17, Model 18, Model 20; then the C-11, C-22, and XBY military versions.

== Design and development ==
The Fleetster received Approved Type Certificate Number 369 on 29 September 1930. It was designed to meet a requirement of the New York, Rio, and Buenos Aires Line (NYRBA) for an aircraft to serve the coastal routes in South America. The Fleetster had a streamlined all-metal monocoque fuselage with a wooden wing. The powerplant was a 575 hp (429 kW) Pratt & Whitney R-1860 Hornet B radial engine. It was available as a landplane or seaplane and could accommodate up to eight passengers, although the three NYRBA aircraft were fitted with two full-width seats each for three passengers.

A parasol-wing version (the Model 20 Fleetster) was also developed with the wing supported by four short struts. The open cockpit was moved behind the passenger cabin and the resultant space was used as a cargo compartment. Three aircraft were built for NYRBA and a private Canadian customer.

In 1932 a carrier-borne dive bomber version (Model 18) was evaluated by the United States Navy as the XBY-1, it was not ordered but was the first stressed-skin aircraft, and the first aircraft with so-called "wet wing" integral fuel tanks in the wings operated by the Navy.

== Variants ==
Model 17-1
Pratt & Whitney R-1860 Hornet B powered production variant for the NYRBA
Model 17AF
Nine-passenger version powered by a 575hp (429kW) Wright R-1820E Cyclone radial engine. The wing had an increased span and area to give an increased maximum takeoff weight. Three planes were built for Ludington Airline, they were later purchased by Pacific Alaska Airways, two of them (NC703YS, NC704Y) were resold to Soviet Union for use as Arctic rescue planes. These two planes were used in heroic rescue of SS Chelyuskin crew in April, 1934.

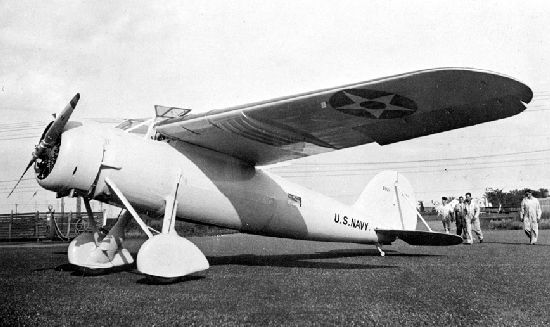
The XBY-1

Model 17-2AC
One aircraft powered by a 575hp (429kW) Wright R-1820E Cyclone radial engine.
Model 18
Two-seat carrier based bomber for US Navy with revised wing (50 ft (15.24 m) span) featuring an integral fuel tank. Fitted with an internal bomb bay capable of carrying a 1,000 lb (450 kg) bomb and powered by 600 hp (448 kW) R-1820-78 engine. One built, evaluated as XBY-1 (BuNo 8921).
Model 20-1
Parasol-wing version of the Model 17 for the NYRBA, four built.

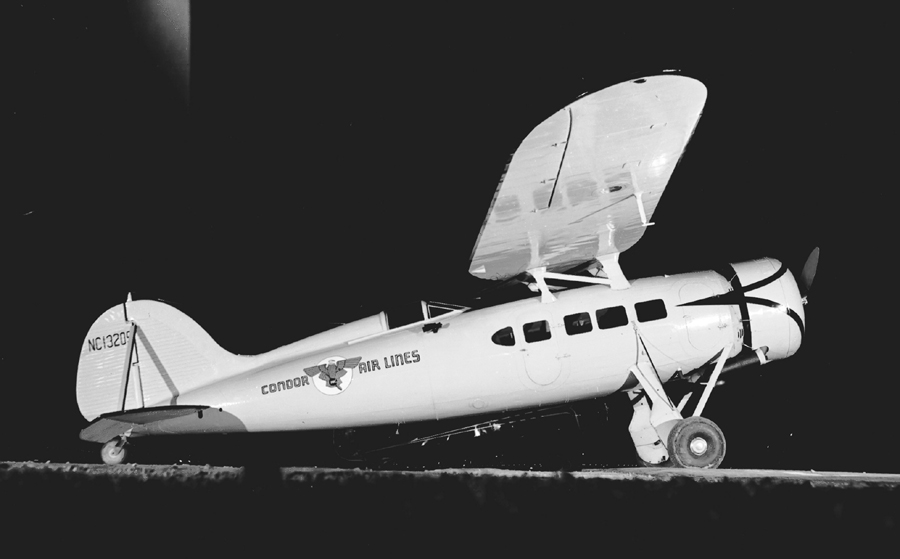
Consolidated Fleetster 20-A of Condor Air Lines

Model 20-A
Production version for the Transcontinental & Western Air was a quick-change variant for passenger or cargo work, seven built.
C-11
One Model 17 bought for use of the United States Assistant Secretary of War and designated Y1C-11, later modified to Model 17-2 standards and redesignated C-11A.

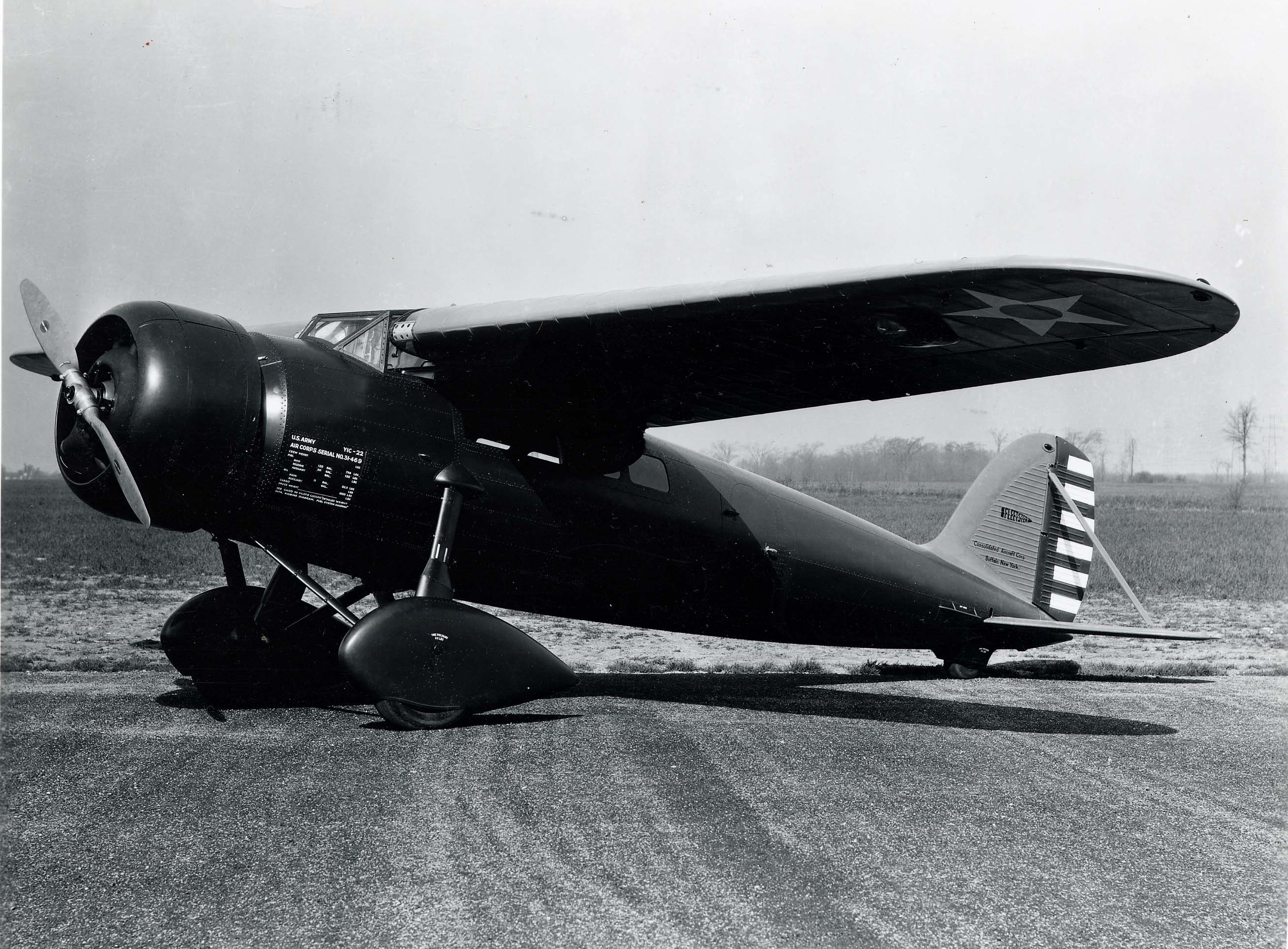
A Y1C-22

C-22
Refined version of the Model 17 for the United States Army Air Corps, three built.

== Operators ==
Argentina

- Argentine Navy, one model 17, coded T-202

Canada

- Canadian Airways, one model 20

Spain

- Spanish Republican Air Force – Model 20-A

United States

- United States Army Air Corps - three C-22
- United States Department of War - one Y1C-11, later converted to C-11A

== Specifications (Model 17) ==
Data from General Dynamics Aircraft and their Predecessors

General characteristics

- Crew: one
- Capacity: eight passengers
- Length: 31 ft 9 in (9.68 m)
- Wingspan: 45 ft 0 in (13.72 m)
- Height: 10 ft 2 in (3.10 m)
- Wing area: 313.5 sq ft (29.12 m^{2})
- Empty weight: 3,326 lb (1,512 kg)
- Gross weight: 5,600 lb (2,545 kg)
- Powerplant: 1 × Pratt & Whitney R-1860 Hornet B radial piston engine , 575 hp (429 kW)

Performance

- Maximum speed: 180 mph (290 km/h, 160 kn)
- Cruise speed: 153 mph (246 km/h, 133 kn)
- Range: 675 mi (1,086 km, 587 nmi)
- Service ceiling: 18,000 ft (5,485 m)

== See also ==
Aircraft of comparable role, configuration, and era

- Lockheed Vega

Related lists

- List of military aircraft of the United States
- List of aircraft of the Spanish Republican Air Force
