= Eclipse Machine Company =

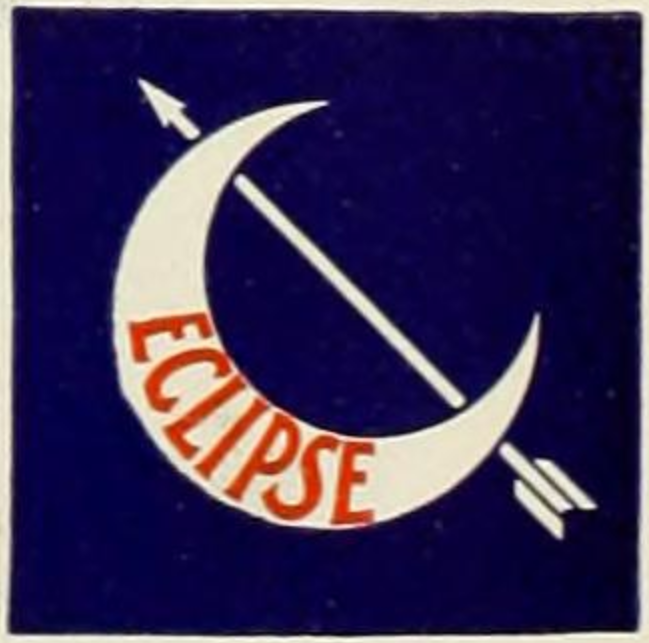
- Formerly: Steel Pulley & Machine Company; Eclipse Bicycle Company
- Industry: Aerospace; Bicycles
- Founded: 1883
- Founder: Harmon H. Fulton
- Headquarters: Elmira Heights, New York, United States
- Parent: Electric Auto-Lite Company; Bendix Aviation

The Eclipse Machine Company was an American bicycle and aircraft component manufacturer.

== History ==
The Steel Pulley & Machine Company was founded in 1883 in Indianapolis, Indiana by Harmon H. Fulton. It moved to Beaver Falls, Pennsylvania in 1892 and again in 1895 to Elmira, New York. Then, in 1914, the company started manufacturing automobile starter motors under license from the Bendix Corporation and in 1929 was acquired by Bendix outright. By 1940, the company had been combined with Pioneer Instrument Company under a new roof at a factory in Teterboro, New Jersey. As part of the consolidation, its plant in Little Falls, which had been damaged in a fire the year before, was closed. During World War II, the company built timed anti-aircraft fuses and 20 mm aircraft cannon. It was the latter that spurred the construction of a second plant in 1940.
