= Pioneer Instrument Company =

American aircraft component manufacturer

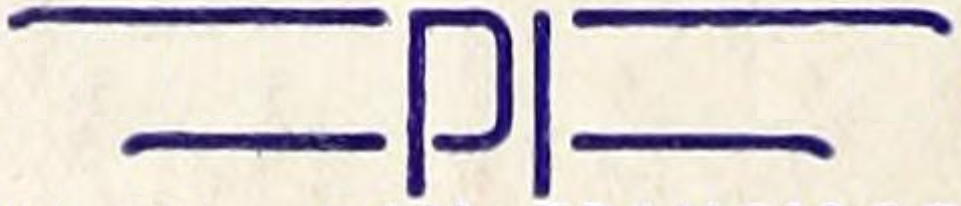
- Industry: Aeronautics
- Founded: 1919 in Brooklyn, New York
- Founders: Charles Herbert Colvin; Brice Herbert Goldsborough; Morris Maxey Titterington
- Headquarters: Teterboro, New Jersey, United States
- Parent: Bendix Corporation (1922–1983)

The Pioneer Instrument Company was an American aircraft component manufacturer.

== History ==
The Pioneer Instrument Company was started by Morris Maxey Titterington and Brice Herbert Goldsborough in Brooklyn, New York in 1919 using patents from the Lawrence Sperry Aircraft Corporation. Charles Herbert Colvin was the president. They specialized in aeronautical instruments including a bubble sextant and the Earth Inductor Compass. The company later acquired control of Brandis & Sons, Inc., in 1922, and Pioneer was later acquired by the Bendix Aviation Corporation in 1928. As the United States was entering World War II, the company became the Pioneer Instrument Division of Bendix Aviation, and moved to New Jersey. By 1943 it had merged with the Eclipse Machine Company to become the Eclipse-Pioneer Division of Bendix Aviation.

The Pioneer division did not survive the end of the Bendix Corporation in 1983.

== Products ==
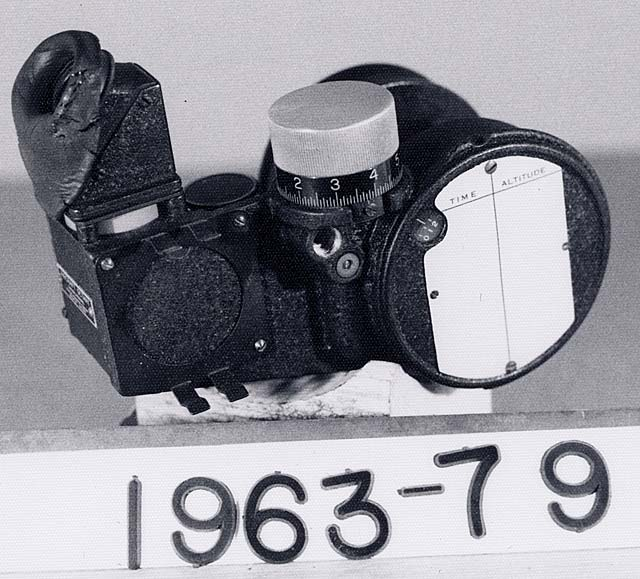
A Pioneer bubble sextant

- ST-90 for the Jupiter and early Saturn I
- ST-80 for the PGM-11 Redstone
- ST-120 for the Pershing missile
- ST-124-M3 inertial platform for the Saturn V
