= Brice Goldsborough =

Brice Herbert Goldsborough
- Born: March 20, 1889; Sioux City, Iowa
- Died: December 23, 1927 (aged 38) crashed on way to Newfoundland
- Occupations: Instrument designer Navigator
- Children: Frank Goldsborough

Brice Herbert Goldsborough (March 20, 1889 – December 23, 1927) was an American aviation instrument designer at Sperry Gyroscope and later founded the Pioneer Instrument Company. He flew aboard the Spirit of St. Louis with Charles Lindbergh in two test flights. He died in an attempt to cross the Atlantic Ocean with Frances Wilson Grayson aboard The Dawn.

== Birth and early career ==
Brice was born in Sioux City, Iowa on March 20, 1889. His brother was Charles Frances Goldsborough.

In 1910, he was serving in the United States Navy and living in Washington, D.C., and he was working as an electrician. He moved to Long Island and later to Manhattan. After serving two four-year terms in the Navy, he and Morris Titterington, the inventor of the ground induction compass, formed the Pioneer Instrument Company in 1919. In 1923, they moved the company to 754 Lexington Ave. in Brooklyn, after buying Brandis & Sons Company. Charles H. Colvin joined the company and was elected president, with both Brice and Morris as vice presidents.

== 1926 Ford Reliability NationalTour ==
Walter Beech (1891-1950) and Brice Herbert Goldsborough won the 1926 Ford Reliability National Air Tour aboard their Travel Air B6 airplane. Brice also flew with Charles Augustus Lindbergh (1902-1974) aboard the Spirit of St. Louis in test flights from Curtiss Field as an "instrument expert" on May 13, 1927 for 10 minutes and May 15, 1927 for 15 minutes. Lindbergh's record breaking flight was on May 20–21, 1927.

== The crash ==
On December 23, 1927 Frances Wilson Grayson with Brice H. Goldsborough as her navigator left from Curtis Field in New York for Harbour Grace, Newfoundland. Her plan was to leave from Newfoundland on a record setting transatlantic flight to London on Christmas day. Her plane, The Dawn was to be flown by Oskar Omdal, a lieutenant in the Norwegian Navy. Grayson may have planned to fly the plane in shifts with him. Goldsborough would have been the navigator and Frank Koehler was to be the radio operator. Her plane never reached Newfoundland and sank in the water. There were several accounts of receiving radio messages from the plane when it was in distress. The bodies and the airplane were never recovered.

== Family ==
Brice's son was Frank Goldsborough (1910–1930), who was a record-setting aviator who also died in a crash.

== Commemoration ==
In 1928, the Ontario Surveyor General named a number of lakes in the northwest of the province to honour aviators who had perished during 1927, mainly in attempting oceanic flights. These include Goldsborough Lake (50.70°N 89.34°W), Grayson Lake (50.88°N 89.43°W) and Omdahl [sic] Lake (50.81°N 89.49°W) which are all found in close proximity to each other in the Wabakimi Provincial Park.

== See also ==
- List of missing aircraft
