= Sikorsky S-34 =

Type of aircraft

S-34

General information
- Type: Amphibian sesquiplane
- National origin: United States
- Manufacturer: Sikorsky Manufacturing Corporation
- Number built: 1

History
- First flight: 1926 or 1927
- Developed into: Sikorsky S-36

The Sikorsky S-34 was a 1920s American six-seat sesquiplane, designed and built by the Sikorsky Manufacturing Corporation. Only one was built, but the design led to the successful Sikorsky S-38.

== Design and development ==
The S-34 was a sesquiplane amphibian with a boat hull, being powered by two tractor 200 hp (149 kW) Wright Whirlwind J-4 engines. It had a boom-mounted twin-rudder tail unit and room inside the hull for five passengers. During a test flight in November 1927, one engine failed and the S-34 crashed and sank. Igor Sikorksy and the others on board escaped without injury but the S-34 was destroyed. It was the first Sikorsky aircraft with a boat hull and would lead to a family of similar flying boats and amphibians.

== Specifications ==
Data from

General characteristics

- Crew: one
- Capacity: five
- Length: 34 ft 0 in (10.36 m)
- Wingspan: 56 ft 0 in (17.07 m)
- Height: 10 ft 7 in (3.23 m)
- Wing area: 396 sq ft (36.79 m^{2})
- Empty weight: 2,900 lb (1,315 kg)
- Gross weight: 4,500 lb (2,041 kg)
- Powerplant: 2 × Wright Whirlwind J-4 , 200 hp (149 kW) each

Performance

- Maximum speed: 45 mph (72.4 km/h, 39 kn)
- Range: 360 mi (579 km, 310 nmi)
- Endurance: 3 hours 0 minutes
- Service ceiling: 15,000 ft (4,572 m)

== See also ==
Related development

- Sikorsky S-36
- Sikorsky S-38

Related lists

- List of flying boats and floatplanes
