= Sikorsky S-41 =

S-41
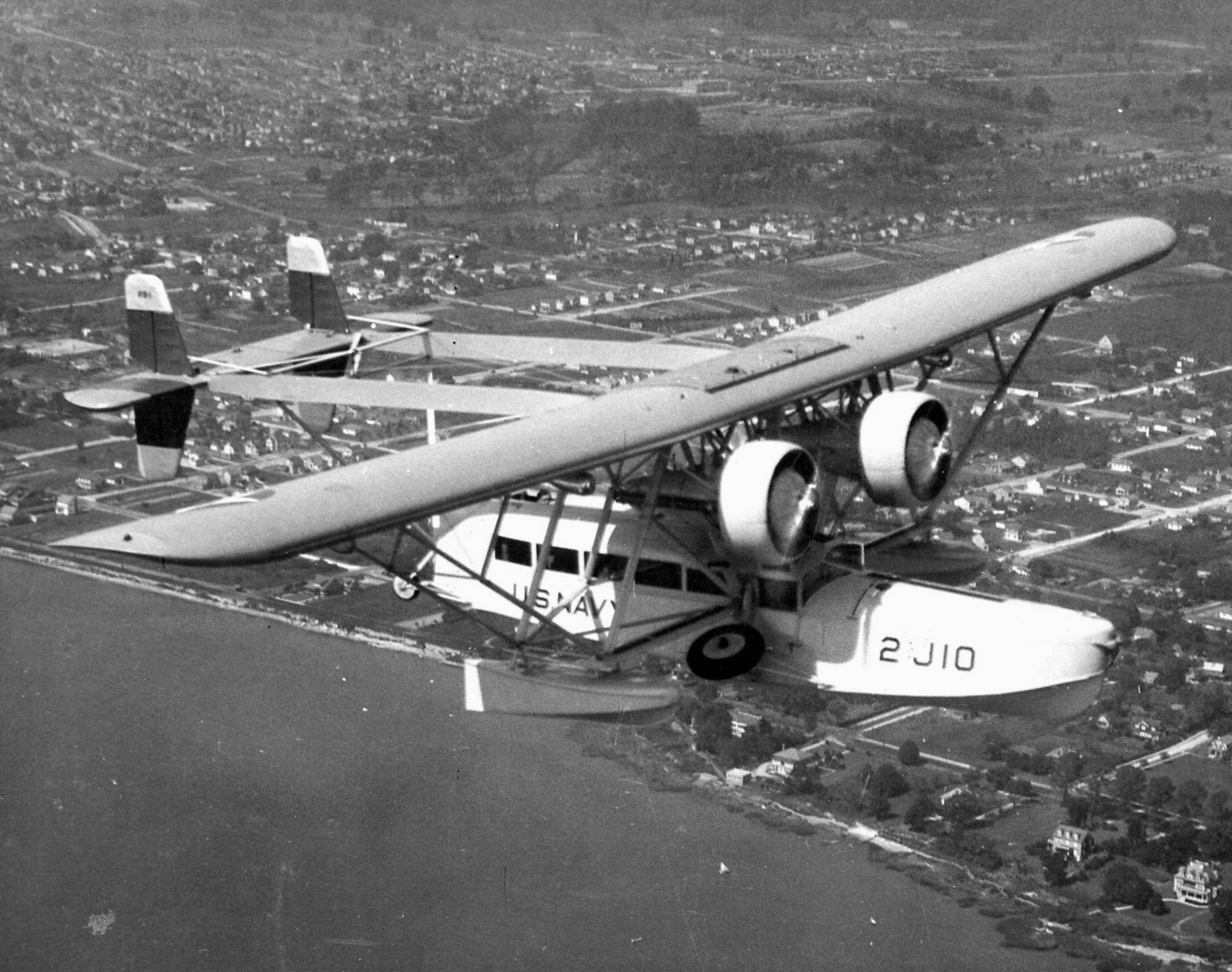
- A U.S. Navy RS-1 in the early 1930s

General information
- Type: Airliner
- National origin: United States
- Manufacturer: Sikorsky Aircraft
- Primary users: Pan Am United States Navy
- Number built: 7

History
- First flight: 1930
- Developed from: Sikorsky S-38

The Sikorsky S-41 was an amphibious flying boat airliner produced in the United States in the early 1930s. Essentially a scaled-up monoplane version of the Sikorsky S-38 biplane flying boat, Pan Am operated the type on routes in the Caribbean, South America, and between Boston and Halifax.

== Development ==
The S-41 had a parasol wing configuration, with two radial engines mounted on struts between the fuselage and the wing. The cabin was completely enclosed within the all-metal hull and could seat 15 passengers.

The United States Navy purchased three examples and designated them RS-1; these were joined by two Pan Am aircraft pressed into Navy service and designated RS-5.

== Variants ==
S-41A
S-41B
S-41C
RS-1
United States Navy designation for three S-41s for evaluation.
RS-5
Two S-41s impressed into service with the United States Navy.

== Operators ==
United States

- Pan Am
- United States Navy

== Accidents and incidents ==
- On 27 August 1931, A Sikorsky S-41, NC41V of Boston-Maine Airways crash landed while making the run between Halifax (N.S.) and Boston (MA). After clinging to the sides of a partially inflated life raft in rough seas for two hours, the 12 survivors were rescued by the F/V Nova Julia, a mackerel seiner out of Gloucester MA, captained by Capt. Leo Favaloro. There was one fatality. Seventy-year-old Edward Bamwell was assumed trapped in the wreckage as it disappeared beneath the waves just a moment after he gallantly allowed one of the three women passengers to precede him to the waiting raft. The Sikorsky had only been in service one month. Heavy fog was cited as the cause of the crash. The S-41 was repaired and reregistered as NC60V.
- On 28 October 1931, Col Thomas C. Turner, Chief of the Aviation Section of the United States Marine Corps, flew as a passenger in a Sikorsky RS-1 to Port-au-Prince, Haiti. After arrival, the aircraft became stuck in the sand; when he got out to inspect it, he was struck in the head by one of its propellers. He died from his injuries two days later.

== Specifications (S-41A) ==
Data from Jane's all the World's Aircraft 1931, U.S. commercial aircraft

General characteristics

- Crew: 2
- Capacity: fifteen
- Length: 45 ft 2 in (13.77 m)
- Wingspan: 78 ft 9.25 in (24.0094 m)
- Wing area: 729 sq ft (67.7 m^{2}) on wheels
- Airfoil: Sikorsky GSM
- Empty weight: 8,100 lb (3,674 kg)
- Gross weight: 13,800 lb (6,260 kg)
- Fuel capacity: 520 US gal (430 imp gal; 2,000 L) maximum (2,400 lb (1,100 kg) fuel and oil)
- Powerplant: 2 × Pratt & Whitney R-1860 Hornet B 9-cylinder air-cooled radial piston engines, 575 hp (429 kW) each
- Propellers: 2-bladed metal propellers

Performance

- Maximum speed: 131 mph (211 km/h, 114 kn)
- Cruise speed: 113 mph (182 km/h, 98 kn)
- Alighting speed: 66 mph (57 kn; 106 km/h)
- Range: 920 mi (1,480 km, 800 nmi)
- Service ceiling: 18,210 ft (5,550 m)
- Rate of climb: 875 ft/min (4.45 m/s)
- Wing loading: 18.93 lb/sq ft (92.4 kg/m^{2})
- Power/mass: 12 lb/hp (7.3 kg/kW)

== See also ==
Related development

- Sikorsky S-38
