= Morris M. Titterington =

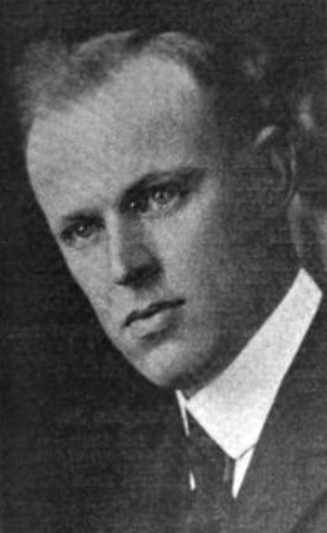
- Born: Morris Maxey Titterington; July 20, 1891; Paris, Texas, US
- Died: July 11, 1928 (aged 36); Pottsville, Pennsylvania, US
- Cause of death: Plane crash
- Education: Bliss Electrical School; Curtiss Flying School
- Occupations: Aviator, engineer

Morris Maxey Titterington (July 20, 1891 – July 11, 1928) was an American aviator and engineer.

== Biography ==
Titterington was born in Paris, Texas, the son of George Titterington.

Titterington graduated from Bliss Electrical School in 1913. In 1914 he graduated from the Curtiss Flying School. In 1918 he was working for the Sperry Gyroscope Corporation and was living in Brooklyn. He was included in the 1925 edition of Who's Who in American Aviation.

Titterington and Brice Herbert Goldsborough founded the Pioneer Instrument Company in 1919. Titterington designed the Earth inductor compass in 1924.

In 1928 he took off in a Travel Air, headed across the Pennsylvania mountains and crashed to his death during bad weather after being struck by lightning.

== Bernice Gamble Andrews ==
Bernice Gamble Andrews (1905-1928) died with him as his passenger. She was the beneficiary of his insurance policy, and she was the daughter of George A. Gamble of Williamsport, Pennsylvania. She was previously married to Fred Andrews and had a son: Fred Andrews, Jr. She had worked in Hollywood as Patricia Perry.
