= Sikorsky S-38 =

1938 flying boat family

S-38
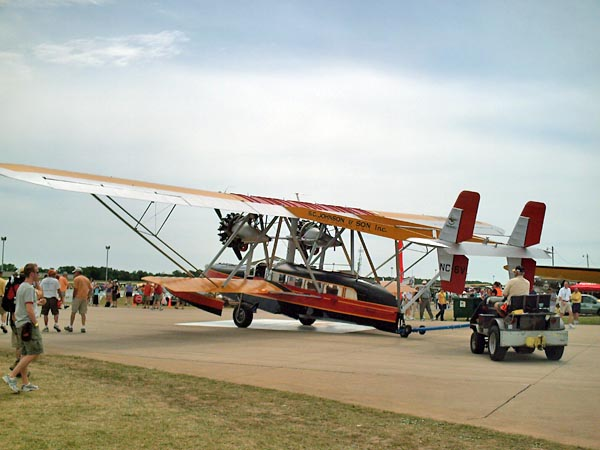
- A replica Sikorsky S-38 being positioned for display at AirVenture, Oshkosh in 2006.

General information
- Type: Amphibious flying boat
- National origin: United States
- Manufacturer: Sikorsky Aircraft
- Designer: Igor Sikorsky
- Primary users: Pan American Airways United States Army; New York, Rio, and Buenos Aires Line; Hawaiian Airlines
- Number built: 101

History
- Introduction date: October 1928
- First flight: 25 May 1928
- Developed from: Sikorsky S-34; Sikorsky S-36

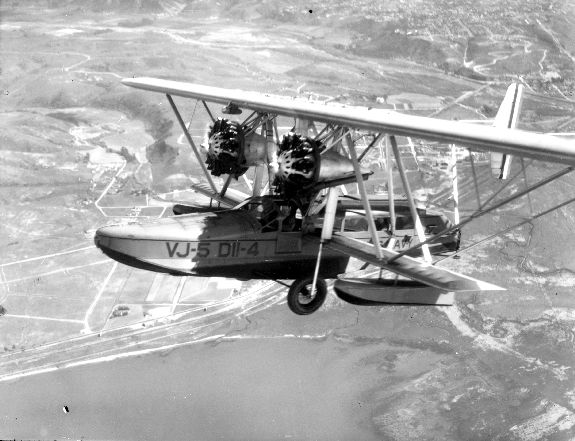
Sikorsky PS-3, serving as a transport for the Eleventh Naval district. VJ-5 D11-4 (8285), photographed in March 1930

The Sikorsky S-38 was an American twin-engined ten-seat sesquiplane amphibious aircraft. It was Sikorsky's first widely produced amphibious flying boat, serving successfully for Pan American Airways and the United States military.

== Design and development ==
The S-38 was developed based upon experience with the Sikorsky S-34 and S-36. The S-38 first flew in May 1928. According to Sikorsky, "The ship had very good takeoff characteristics from land and water. It had a climb of 1,000 feet (300 m) per minute fully loaded, and a maximum speed close to 130 miles per hour (210 km/h). The ship could cruise nicely around 100 miles per hour (160 km/h), and it stayed in the air on one engine. All these features were excellent for 1928 and at that time there were no other amphibians with such performance characteristics. In 1929, an S-38 was used by Colonel Lindbergh to inaugurate air mail service between the United States and the Panama Canal." The United States Navy ordered two aircraft, and Pan Am was an early customer.

A total of 101 aircraft were built, manufactured originally by the Sikorsky Manufacturing Corporation of Long Island, New York, and by the Sikorsky Aviation Corporation in Bridgeport, Connecticut. Sikorsky was acquired by United Aircraft and Transport Corporation in mid-production.

== Variants ==
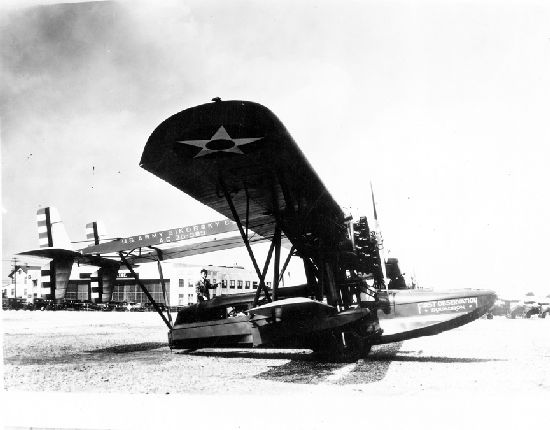
A C-6A

S-38A
11 Built
S-38B
Ten-place model, 80 Built
S-38C
12-place model, ten Built
C-6
United States Army Air Forces designation for the S-38A for evaluation, one aircraft later used as a VIP transport.
C-6A
United States Army Air Forces designation for a C-6 with minor changes, ten aircraft.
XPS-2
United States Navy designation for the S-38A, two aircraft later converted to XRS-2 transports.
PS-3
United States Navy designation for the S-38B, four aircraft later converted to RS-3 transports.
XRS-2
United States Navy designation for two XPS-2 converted as transports.
RS-3
United States Navy/Marine Corps designation for the S-38B transport version, three aircraft and conversions from PS-3.

== Operators ==
=== Civil operators ===
- KNILM
- Curtiss Flying Service
- Hawaiian Airlines
- Inter-Island Airways
- New York, Rio, and Buenos Aires Line (NYRBA) - Used for first airmail from Argentina to Miami. All sold to Pan Am in 1930
- Pan American-Grace Airways – Operated out of Lima, Peru
- Western Air Express
- SCADTA

=== Military operators ===
- Spanish Republican Air Force. One unit was used on the Northern Front during the Spanish Civil War. Shot down by friendly fire
- United States Army Air Forces
- United States Marine Corps
- United States Navy

=== Private operators ===
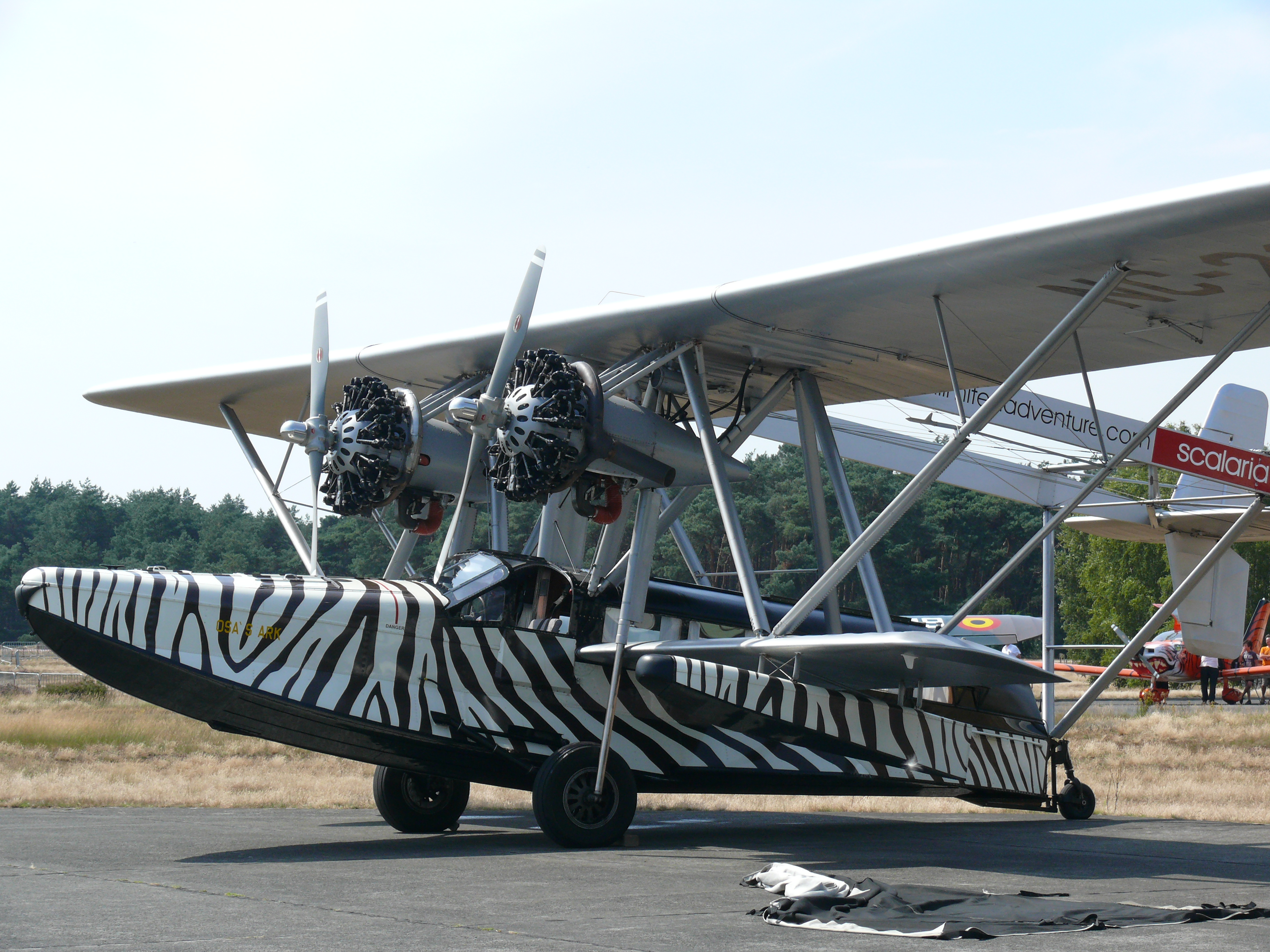
Osa's Ark S-38

Some notable private owners include:

- Flying Hutchinsons – first attempted around-the-world flight by a family
- Howard Hughes
- Herbert Fisk Johnson Jr. – Explored the northeastern part of Brazil in search of the carnauba palm, and to research carnauba wax, the source of the world's hardest natural wax. The Spirit of Carnauba, a replica of this aircraft, is on display in Fortaleza Hall on the S. C. Johnson campus.
- Martin and Osa Johnson – In the zebra-striped S-38 Osa's Ark, with companion giraffe-patterned S-39 Spirit of Africa, explored Africa extensively, making safari movies and books.
- Charles Lindbergh – surveyed South American and Pacific Ocean routes for Pan Am with Anne Morrow Lindbergh.
- Robert R. McCormick, newspaper publisher – surveyed commercial air routes between North America and Europe.

== Reproductions ==
During the 1990s two reproduction S-38s were built by the late Buzz Kaplan's “Born Again Restorations,” of Owatonna, Minnesota. One was produced for Samuel Curtis Johnson Jr., the son of Herbert Fisk Johnson, to recreate his father's flight, which he completed in 1998. As of August 2017 the plane is suspended from the ceiling of Fortaleza Hall in the S. C. Johnson & Son company headquarters in Racine, Wisconsin . The other S-38 replica, N28V, appeared in the movie The Aviator (2004), a story loosely based on the life of Howard Hughes, who owned an S-38 during his lifetime. As of August 2017 it is owned by Kermit Weeks and located at the Fantasy of Flight Museum in Polk City, Florida, bearing the Osa's Ark paint scheme.

== Accidents and incidents ==
- A SCADTA (actually Avianca, never was a Pan Am subsidiary) S-38, NC9107, crashed in the Colombian jungle near Pereira, killing all but one on board; the survivor was carried for seven days through the jungle to civilization.
- T. Raymond Finucane, a wealthy Rochester, NY businessman, and three others disappeared over the sea aboard a Sikorsky Amphibian after departing Norfolk, Virginia for New York City March 22, 1929. In Miami, Florida, Finucane had wagered a friend who was traveling ahead by train that he (Finucane) would reach New York first. He chartered Curtiss Flying Service to fly him to New York from Miami. Also on board the missing aircraft were Frank Ables and J. Boyd, Curtiss mechanics, along with Harry Smith, the pilot. A massive search by Curtiss planes, American military planes, coast guard cutters, and even the airship Los Angeles failed to turn up anything. Mrs. Finucane, founding president of the Rochester Community Players, visited the Curtiss operation at Roosevelt Field, the destination of the flight, for updates. Wreckage presumed to be from this plane was found eight years later by a fishing schooner.
- On September 25, 1932, a Panair do Brasil Sikorsky S-38 registration P-BDAD still bearing the titles of Nyrba do Brasil was seized in the company's hangar by three men, who took a fourth man hostage. None were aviators but they managed to take off. However the aircraft crashed in São João de Meriti, killing the four men. Apparently the hijack was related to the events of the Constitutionalist Revolution in São Paulo and it is considered to be the first hijack that took place in Brazil.

== Specifications (S-38-B) ==
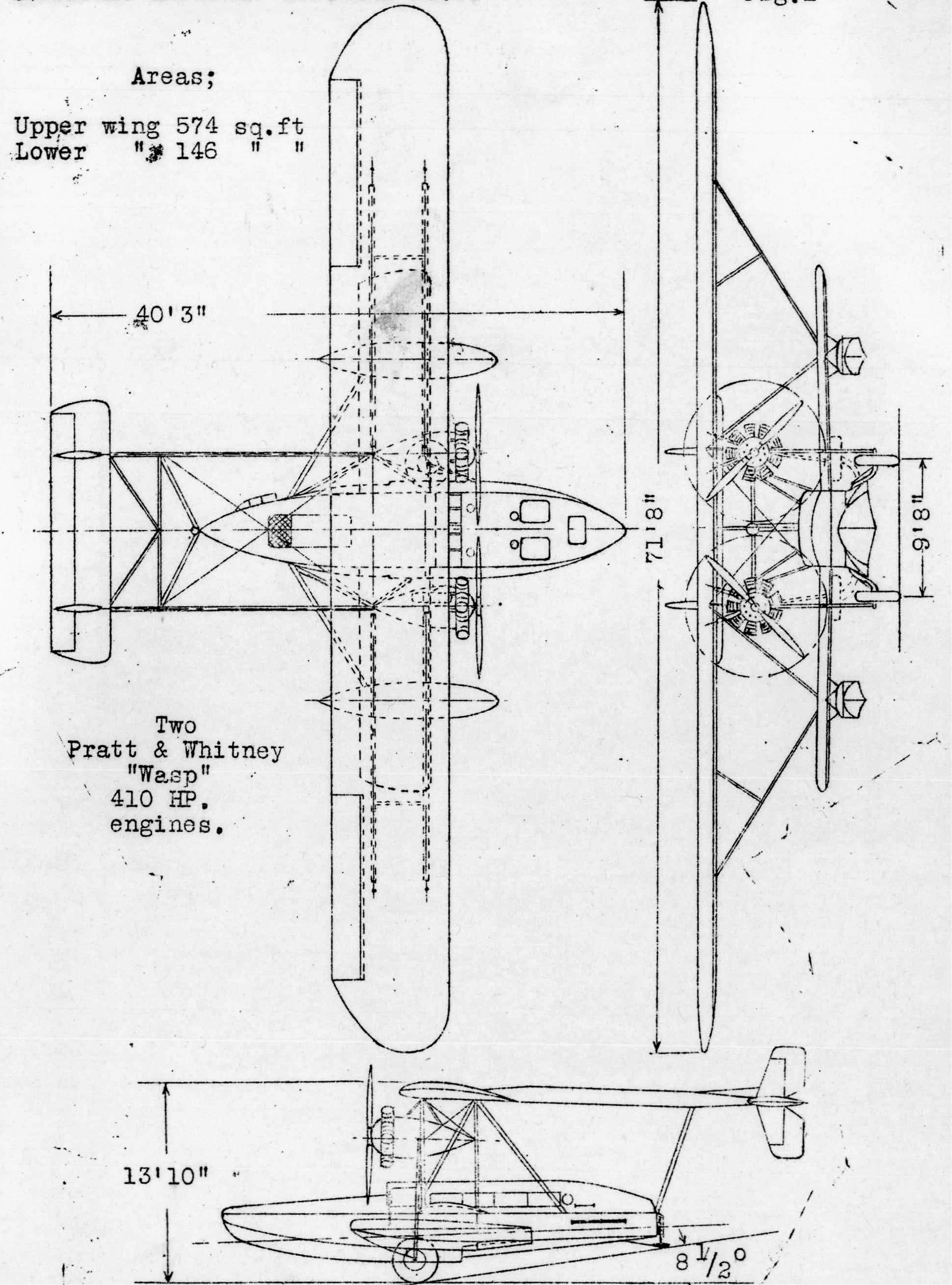
Sikorsky S-38 3-view drawing from NACA Aircraft Circular No.79

Data from Aerofiles : Sikorsky, American flying boats and amphibious aircraft : an illustrated history

General characteristics

- Crew: 2
- Capacity: 8 - 10 pax / 4,480 lb (2,030 kg) payload
- Length: 40 ft 5 in (12.32 m)
- Upper wingspan: 71 ft 8 in (21.84 m)
- Lower wingspan: 36 ft 0 in (10.97 m)
- Height: 13 ft 10 in (4.22 m)
- Wing area: 720 sq ft (67 m^{2})
- Airfoil: Sikorsky GS-1
- Empty weight: 6,548 lb (2,970 kg)
- Gross weight: 10,479 lb (4,753 kg)
- Powerplant: 2 × Pratt & Whitney R-1340 Wasp 9-cylinder air-cooled radial piston engine, 420 hp (310 kW) each
- Propellers: 2-bladed ground-adjustable metal propellers

Performance

- Maximum speed: 124 mph (200 km/h, 108 kn)
- Cruise speed: 109 mph (175 km/h, 95 kn)
- Stall speed: 57 mph (92 km/h, 50 kn)
- Range: 600 mi (970 km, 520 nmi)
- Service ceiling: 18,000 ft (5,500 m)
- Rate of climb: 750 ft/min (3.8 m/s)
- Wing loading: 14.5 lb/sq ft (71 kg/m^{2})
- Power/mass: 0.0813 hp/lb (0.1337 kW/kg)

== See also ==
- Sikorsky RS, a designation used by the United States Navy for a number of different Sikorsky twin-engined amphibious flying boats

Aircraft of comparable role, configuration, and era

- Keystone-Loening Commuter
- Keystone–Loening Air Yacht
- Grumman Widgeon
- Grumman Goose

Related lists

- List of aircraft of the Spanish Republican Air Force
- List of interwar military aircraft
