= List of people who disappeared mysteriously at sea =

Throughout history, people have mysteriously disappeared at sea. The following is a list of known individuals who have mysteriously vanished in open waters, and whose whereabouts remain unknown. In most ocean deaths, bodies are never recovered, but this fact alone does not make their disappearance mysterious. For example, the victims of the RMS Titanic disaster are not considered to have disappeared mysteriously at sea.

== 13th century – 1969 ==
Date	Person(s)	Age	Missing from	Circumstances	Ref.
c. 1291	Vandino Vivaldi	Unknown	Atlantic Ocean	The Genoese sailor and explorer brothers were lost while attempting the first oceanic journey from Europe to Asia. Their two galleys sailed out of the Mediterranean Sea and into the Atlantic Ocean, but were not heard from again.	
c. 1291	Ugolino Vivaldi	Unknown	Atlantic Ocean	The Genoese sailor and explorer brothers were lost while attempting the first oceanic journey from Europe to Asia. Their two galleys sailed out of the Mediterranean Sea and into the Atlantic Ocean, but were not heard from again.	
c. 1307 or c. 1312	Muhammad ibn Qu	Unknown	Atlantic Ocean	The eighth mansa of the Mali Empire, who was said by his successor Mansa Musa to have disappeared in an attempt to discover the limits of the Atlantic Ocean. This account has fueled speculation that Musa's predecessor reached the Americas, but no evidence of his fate is known.	
c. 1346	Jaume Ferrer	Unknown	Atlantic Ocean	Mallorcan sailor who sailed down the west coast of Africa in search of the "River of Gold". The results of his quest, including his fate, are unknown.	
1487	João Afonso do Estreito	Unknown	Atlantic Ocean	Portuguese sailor who was the co-captain of an expedition aiming to explore the Atlantic Ocean. He and his Flemish partner Ferdinand Van Olm set sail, but never returned, and were presumed lost at sea.	
1499	John Cabot	~49	Northwest Passage	Cabot, an Italian explorer, departed with five ships during an expedition to find a western route from Europe to Asia. There are no known records of what happened to him and his expedition after that; it is not known if they disappeared at sea, remained in North America, or returned safely to Europe.	
24 March 1500	Vasco de Ataíde	Unknown	Cape Verde or Cape of Good Hope	Portuguese sailor Vasco de Ataíde's ship was part of Pedro Álvares Cabral's 1500 expedition to India. On 24 March, the ship he captained and its 150 crew disappeared after sailing west toward Brazil. The chronicler of the expedition said that there were no strong or contrary winds that could have caused the loss.	
1501	Gaspar Corte-Real	50–51	Northwest Passage	Portuguese explorer Gaspar Corte-Real disappeared on an expedition to discover the Northwest Passage from Europe to Asia. Two of his ships returned to Lisbon, but the third, with Gaspar on board, was lost and never heard from again.	
1502	Miguel Corte-Real	53–54	Northwest Passage	Miguel Corte-Real, a Portuguese explorer, disappeared while searching for his brother Gaspar. Like his brother, he took three ships and, like his brother's ship, his own was lost and never heard from again.	
1511	Diego de Nicuesa	Unknown	Caribbean Sea	Nicuesa, a Spanish conquistador and explorer, disappeared along with 17 crewmen while en route to Santo Domingo, after being denied entry to the colonial settlement of Santa María la Antigua del Darién.	
1526	Francisco de Hoces	Unknown	Pacific Ocean	De Hoces was the commander of the San Lesmes which was one of the seven ships of the Loaísa expedition under García Jofre de Loaísa. It has been speculated that the San Lesmes, last seen in the Pacific Ocean in late May, reached Easter Island, the Polynesian archipelago, or even New Zealand.	
1579	Ikegusuku Antō	Unknown	East China Sea	A bureaucrat of the Ryukyu Kingdom, Ikegusuku Antō was sent as an envoy to China, but his ship was caught in a storm and disappeared in the sea in 1579 and was never seen again.	
23 June 1611	Henry Hudson	45–46	Northwest Passage	Hudson went on multiple expeditions of present-day Canada and parts of the northeastern United States, searching for the Northwest Passage. In 1611, after wintering on the shore of James Bay, Hudson wanted to press on to the west, but most of his crew mutinied. The mutineers cast Hudson, his teenage son and seven others adrift; the Hudsons and their companions were never seen again.	
1638	Urasoe Chōri	Unknown	Satsuma Domain	A member of Sanshikan, Urasoe Chōri went on a boat trip to Satsuma, but his ship was caught in a storm and disappeared in the sea. He is believed to have drowned.	
1647	George Lamberton	Unknown	Atlantic Ocean	The New Haven Colony paid for a ship to be built in Rhode Island, and the colonists loaded it with furs and other goods they hoped would finance their settlement, which was foundering. The ship set sail for England in January 1647 under Captain George Lamberton, and the colonists waited for news, which never came. The ship was presumed lost in a storm, with all aboard. One passenger was Mary Goodyear, the wife of Deputy Governor Stephen Goodyear. The ship was known in legend as the Phantom Ship or Ghost Ship.	
c. 1671	Roche Braziliano	40–41	Location unknown	A Dutch pirate born in the town of Groningen, Roche Braziliano, whose career lasted from 1654 until 1671, disappeared during that year, and was never seen again.	
April 1686	Michel de Grammont	40–41	Near St. Augustine, Florida, U.S.	The French privateer renowned for attacking Spanish flagships from 1670 to 1686, was lost in a storm together with his entire crew while on a rescue mission to save fellow buccaneer Nicolas Brigaut.	
1688	John Coxon	Unknown	Jamaica	Coxon, a buccaneer and member of the Brethren of the Coast who was infamous for his various raids on the Spanish Main through the 17th century, turned to hunting pirates in 1682. He, his 97-man crew, and an eighty-ton ship armed with eight guns, mysteriously disappeared in 1688; their fate is unknown.	
1694	Ridderschap van Holland	Unknown	Indian Ocean	Ridderschap van Holland arrived at the Cape of Good Hope on 9 January 1694, remaining there until 5 February. Ridderschap van Holland sailed from the Cape with a crew of around 300, and two passengers, including Admiral Sir James Couper. She never reached her destination, and was never heard from again. Contemporary rumours suggested that she had sprung her mast rounding the Cape, limped north and been captured by pirates based at Fort Dauphin, near the south-eastern corner of Madagascar. However, Abraham Samuel, the pirate supposedly responsible, did not arrive in the area until 1695.	
January 1726	Aagtekerke	Various	Indian Ocean	The Aagtekerke, a ship of the Dutch East India Company, left for Batavia in the Dutch East Indies on 27 January 1726, but was lost with all hands and without trace. It was carrying silver coins and precious metals with a total value of 200,000 guilders. There is some evidence from the crew of the wrecked ship Zeewijk that Aagtekerke was wrecked on the Abrolhos Islands, because they found some remains of a Dutch vessel that had been wrecked before them.	
1750 or 1760	Sea Bird	Unknown	Rhode Island, U.S.	The Sea Bird, which also went by other names, was a merchant brig that, after a Honduras voyage and then grounding in Rhode Island at Easton's Beach in either 1750 or 1760, had lost its longboat. No people were found living on it; all that was found was a cat and a dog. The crew aboard was never seen again. The ship itself was sold to a merchant of Newport, renamed the Beach Bird under which name she made many voyages.	
28 October 1758	Edward Moore, 5th Earl of Drogheda	56–57	Irish Sea	Edward Moore was an Anglo-Irish peer and politician who went missing in a storm at sea while travelling between Holyhead and Dublin and is believed to have died.	
29 October 1766	John Stanwix	75–76	Atlantic Ocean	The British soldier and politician was lost at sea while travelling from Dublin, Ireland to Holyhead, Wales in a packet boat.	
c. January 1770	Henry Vansittart	37	Indian Ocean	Vansittart, MP and director of the East India Company, Scrafton and Forde formed a delegation to investigate corruption and reform the British government in India and sailed on the frigate Aurora. Scottish Royal Navy midshipman Robert Pitcairn after whom the Pitcairn Islands are named, and Scottish epic poet William Falconer were also on board. The Aurora disappeared with all hands around January 1770, apparently in a storm. The captain had decided to sail the Mozambique Channel despite bad weather.	
c. January 1770	Luke Scrafton	Unknown	Indian Ocean		
c. January 1770	Francis Forde	51–52	Indian Ocean		
c. January 1770	William Falconer	37	Indian Ocean		
c. January 1770	Robert Pitcairn	17	Indian Ocean		
1778	Benjamin Church	43–44	Caribbean Sea	Church, the first Surgeon General of the United States Army, was imprisoned for communicating with the British in 1776. He was released in 1778, and shortly thereafter disappeared while sailing from Boston.	
17 December 1779	Thomas Lynch Jr.	30	Caribbean Sea	Thomas Lynch Jr. was a signer of the United States Declaration of Independence. In late 1779, he and his wife Elizabeth set sail to Sint Eustatius in the West Indies. The ship disappeared shortly after its departure.	
January 1780	Morgan Connor	Unknown	Location unknown	Connor, a Continental Army officer who served as Adjutant General in 1777, was lost at sea in January 1780.	
December 1780	William Palfrey	38–39	Atlantic Ocean	William Palfrey was an American Patriot born in 1741. He went missing after getting lost at sea in December 1780 following a business trip to France.	
c. December 1781	Charles Carpenter	Unknown	Location unknown	Carpenter disappeared with the rest of the crew of HMS Necker, presumed foundered while sailing from Saint Helena to the East Indies.	
March 1781	John Young	40–41	Caribbean Sea	Young, a captain of the American Continental Navy, was the commander of the USS Saratoga when it vanished at sea during a gale while returning home from present-day Haiti.	
1788	Jean-François de Galaup (Lapérouse) and his expedition	46–47 (Galaup)	Botany Bay, Australia	The French expedition of Jean-François de Galaup, Comte de Lapérouse, disappeared after their last stop at Botany Bay (now Sydney), after meeting ships of Britain's First Fleet bringing convicts to establish the new settlement that became Australia. The wrecks of the expedition's two ships, the Boussole and Astrolabe), were subsequently discovered by Dumont-D'Urville during his second trip around the world at Vanikoro, an island in the Santa Cruz group (part of the Solomon Islands) where the survivors may have set up camp.	
July–August 1788	Aimée du Buc de Rivéry	11	Caribbean Sea	Rivéry, a French heiress, vanished at sea while returning home to Martinique from the mainland. A popular legend suggests that she was abducted by pirates and sold as a concubine to the Ottoman Sultan under the name Nakşidil Sultan, but this has never been proven.	
1794	Robert Manners Sutton	Unknown	Mediterranean Sea	Captain Robert Manners Sutton disappeared with the rest of the crew of HMS Ardent in 1794, believed lost to a fire and explosion.	
31 January 1797	William Mulso	Unknown	Location unknown	Commander William Mulso disappeared with the rest of the crew of HMS Hermes on 31 January 1797, presumably foundered during a gale.	
19 December 1799 or after	Thomas Atkinson	Unknown	Atlantic Ocean	Captain Atkinson disappeared with the rest of the crew of Mildred on or after 19 December 1799, while sailing from Jamaica.	
c. September 1800	Patrick Fletcher	Unknown	West Indies	Fletcher was in command of the USS Insurgent when it disappeared near the West Indies in 1800. A severe storm struck the West Indies on 20 September, and it is thought to have caused the loss as well as that of the Pickering.	
c. September 1800	Joseph Ingraham	37–38	West Indies	Ingraham, an American sailor and maritime fur trader credited with discovering several islands in the Marquesas Islands territory as well as a three-year-long voyage across the world, disappeared while serving aboard the USS Pickering along with the rest of the crew, presumably lost in a gale.	
c. 25 October 1800	Crew of HMS Babet	Various	Caribbean Sea	HMS Babet was a 20-gun sixth-rate post ship of the British Royal Navy. The vessel and her crew disappeared shortly after departing from Fort Royal Bay, Martinique on 24 October 1800. She is believed to have foundered during a tropical storm.	
c. 1802/1803	George Roper	Unknown	Location unknown	The HCS Intrepid, captained by George Roper, and HCS Comet, captained by Lieutenant William Henry, were both sent by the East India Company to search for what caused the loss of the Earl Talbot. They reportedly made many discoveries relating to natural history and geography, and saw wreckage of other vessels on uninhabited islands, but found nothing further concerning Lord Eldon. By 1803, they were recognized to have disappeared without a trace, and presumed to have foundered at sea.	
c. 1802/1803	William Henry	Unknown	Location unknown	The HCS Intrepid, captained by George Roper, and HCS Comet, captained by Lieutenant William Henry, were both sent by the East India Company to search for what caused the loss of the Earl Talbot. They reportedly made many discoveries relating to natural history and geography, and saw wreckage of other vessels on uninhabited islands, but found nothing further concerning Lord Eldon. By 1803, they were recognized to have disappeared without a trace, and presumed to have foundered at sea.	
5 February 1803	George Bass	32	Port Jackson, Australia	The British explorer of Australia set sail from Sydney for South America and was never heard from again.	
1 December 1804	James Tippett	Unknown	English Channel	Hawk, under Tippet's command, and Boadicea were cruising in the English Channel when on 1 December Hawk set off in pursuit of a strange sail. She never reappeared. The Admiralty presumed that she had foundered and paid her off on 31 December 1804.	
1807	James Hawes	Unknown	Mediterranean Sea	Moucheron disappeared in the eastern Mediterranean in early 1807, with some accounts specifying the Dardanelles. As no trace of her or her crew was ever found, this is pure conjecture. The Royal Navy officially paid her off effective 7 June 1807.	
c. September 1807	John Sedley	Unknown	Unknown	HMS Elizabeth disappeared without a trace, presumed to have foundered with all hands.	
c. November 1808	John Logan	Unknown	Unknown	Experiment, Glory and Lord Nelson parted company with the fleet in a gale between 20 and 23 November, at 8°30′S 80°00′E. None of the three vessels was ever heard of again. The EIC declared that the value of its cargo on Experiment was £5,592.	
March 1809	Hay MacDowall	Unknown	Cape of Good Hope, South Africa	Scottish British Army officer MacDowall disappeared with the rest of the crew of the Lady Jane Dundas in March 1809, while sailing back home to England.	
13/14 March 1809	John James Ridge	Unknown	Indian Ocean	Harrier was in company with her sister ship Racehorse, about 1,000 nmi (1,900 km; 1,200 mi) from Rodrigues. Harrier fell behind and was never seen again. She was presumed to have foundered with all hands.	
27 August 1809	J. Hill	Unknown	Atlantic Ocean	Captain J. Hill disappeared with the rest of the crew of the Bellona in 1809, while sailing back home to England from Jamaica.	
16 February 1810 or after	John Bader	Unknown	Tasman Sea	Bader, the commander of the ship Active, disappeared after landing a sealing party on the Open Bay Islands and subsequently setting sail for Sydney.	
2–3 January 1813	Theodosia Burr Alston	29	Coast of South Carolina, U.S.	The daughter of U.S. Vice President Aaron Burr, and sometimes called the most educated American woman of her day, sailed from Georgetown, South Carolina, aboard the Patriot, which was never seen again.	
28 February 1814	John Davies	Unknown	English Channel	Anacreon was last sighted on 28 February 1814 in the English Channel as she was returning from Lisbon. Soon thereafter, she disappeared without trace in a storm. All aboard were lost.	
c. October 1814	Johnston Blakeley	32–33	Atlantic Ocean	Blakeley, an officer in the United States Navy during the Quasi-War with France and the War of 1812, was in command of the sloop-of-war Wasp when it was lost in the Atlantic in October 1814.	
c. July/August 1815	John Yarnall	Unknown	Atlantic Ocean	After the Dey signed a treaty, Decatur chose Epervier, under Lieutenant John T. Shubrick, Guerriere's former first lieutenant, to carry a copy of the treaty and some captured flags to the United States. Captain Lewis, and Lieutenants Neale and John Yarnall, came on board as passengers. Epervier sailed through the Straits of Gibraltar on 14 July 1815 and was never heard from again. Epervier may have encountered a hurricane reported in the Atlantic on 9 August 1815. In all, she was carrying 132 sailors and two marines.	
c. August 1815	D.Grierson	Unknown	Unknown	On 2 August 1815 as Preston was sailing from Jamaica to London in a convoy she encountered a gale that cost her her main and mizzen masts. A later report stated that Preston, under master Grierson, had been seen since the gale. The last report concerning the convoy of which Preston was part stated that Preston, Grierson, master, was one of the eight ships missing.	
8–17 January 1816	Samuel Shaw	Unknown	Port Jackson, Australia	The commander of the 90-ton brig Amelia, Shaw disappeared after departing from Port Jackson, Australia on the way to Java and Canton, China, carrying 50 tons of sandalwood and five tons of coal.	
July 1816	George Winney	Unknown	Tasman Sea?	The commander of the ship Whale, Winney and two crew members disappeared in July 1816 after heading out of Sydney bound for Hawkesbury.	
1816/1817	Jonathon Read	Unknown	Unknown	Captain Jonathon Read commanded Anna when it was lost at sea in 1816 or 1817.	
28 January 1821	Obed Hendricks	Unknown	Pacific Ocean	Sailors on the whaler Essex, which sank in the Pacific on 20 November 1820 after being struck by a sperm whale. Their whaleboat was separated on the open sea from their fellow crewmen on 28 January 1821; it was never seen again. Years later, a boat with three skeletons inside was discovered washed up on Ducie Island, but the skeletons were not identified as being theirs.	
28 January 1821	William Bond	Unknown	Pacific Ocean	Sailors on the whaler Essex, which sank in the Pacific on 20 November 1820 after being struck by a sperm whale. Their whaleboat was separated on the open sea from their fellow crewmen on 28 January 1821; it was never seen again. Years later, a boat with three skeletons inside was discovered washed up on Ducie Island, but the skeletons were not identified as being theirs.	
28 January 1821	Joseph West	Unknown	Pacific Ocean	Sailors on the whaler Essex, which sank in the Pacific on 20 November 1820 after being struck by a sperm whale. Their whaleboat was separated on the open sea from their fellow crewmen on 28 January 1821; it was never seen again. Years later, a boat with three skeletons inside was discovered washed up on Ducie Island, but the skeletons were not identified as being theirs.	
22 April 1822	Charles Lefebvre-Desnouettes	49	Off the coast of Ireland	The French military officer and general during the Napoleonic Wars later fled to America to escape prosecution from the loyalists. He was allowed to return, but presumably died when his ship sank off the coast of Ireland.	
c. 5 February 1823	Jean Lafitte	42	Gulf of Honduras	French pirate and privateer Jean Lafitte was granted a commission from the Great Colombia government to take Spanish ships in June 1822. He is thought to have died on 5 February 1823 while trying to take two Spanish merchant vessels in the Gulf of Honduras, but rumors abounded that he had a different fate.	
June 1827	Douglas Clavering	32–33	near Sierra Leone	Clavering, a British Royal Navy officer and Arctic explorer, served as a commander of HMS Redwing when it disappeared near Sierra Leone with all hands, never to be seen again.	
April 1831	Carlo Giuseppe Bertero	42	South Pacific Ocean	The Italian naturalist and botanist known for documenting the flora and fauna in the West Indies and South America presumably died in a shipwreck while on a voyage from Tahiti to Chile.	
17 July 1835	Henry Hutton	Unknown	Unknown	Forth departed from Manila on 17 July 1835 for London. She disappeared without a trace and was presumed to have foundered with the loss of all hands.	
1840	Rosalie	Various	Atlantic Ocean	The Rosalie, a large French vessel, was found abandoned with sails set and cargo intact. Its crew had vanished.	
17 March 1841	Richard Roberts	37–38	Atlantic Ocean	Roberts was the captain of the SS President when it disappeared in a gale while returning back to Liverpool from New York. Methodist clergyman Rev. George Grimston Cookman who served as the Chaplain of the Senate and Irish comic actor Tyrone Power were among the passengers who were lost.	
17 March 1841	George Grimston Cookman	40	Atlantic Ocean	Roberts was the captain of the SS President when it disappeared in a gale while returning back to Liverpool from New York. Methodist clergyman Rev. George Grimston Cookman who served as the Chaplain of the Senate and Irish comic actor Tyrone Power were among the passengers who were lost.	
17 March 1841	Tyrone Power	43	Atlantic Ocean	Roberts was the captain of the SS President when it disappeared in a gale while returning back to Liverpool from New York. Methodist clergyman Rev. George Grimston Cookman who served as the Chaplain of the Senate and Irish comic actor Tyrone Power were among the passengers who were lost.	
July 1845	Franklin's lost expedition	59 (Franklin)	Victoria Strait	The expedition led by Sir John Franklin, with 129 seamen, made last contact with a whaling ship before entering Victoria Strait in search of the Northwest Passage. The remains of some individuals, written messages and the wrecks of the ships HMS Erebus (in 2014) and HMS Terror (in 2016) were later discovered. However, the majority of the crew, including Franklin himself, were never found, with the crew having probably died from a combination of lead poisoning, starvation and exposure.	
7 October 1849	Francisque Arban	34	Mediterranean Sea	Arban was a French balloonist renowned as the first person to cross the Alps in a balloon. On 7 October 1849, he took on a flight from Barcelona but was blown over to the Mediterranean Sea, where he disappeared and is thought to have died.	
17 May 1852	Sir Montagu Chapman, 3rd Baronet	51	Tasman Sea	The Anglo-Irish landowner and High Sheriff of Westmeath in 1844 disappeared while sailing from Melbourne to Sydney, Australia.	
28 or 29 September 1854	James Thompson Gerry	Unknown	Caribbean Sea	As of 30 June 1854, the crew of Albany consisted of 18 officers, 156 seaman, and 23 Marines. It is likely the ship's complement was little changed when she was lost three months later. The crew included several sons and grandsons of prominent men: Commander James T. Gerry, youngest son of Elbridge Gerry, formerly Vice President of the United States, Lieutenant John Quincy Adams, grandson of the second president and nephew of the sixth, and Midshipman Bennet Israel Riley, son of Brevet General Bennet C. Riley, the former military governor of California during its statehood controversy.	
23 January 1856	Asa Eldridge	47	Atlantic Ocean	Eldridge was the commander of the SS Pacific when it disappeared under mysterious circumstances while sailing to New York from Liverpool. The bishop of Hartford, Bernard O'Reilly, who was returning from a trip to Europe, was among those lost.	
23 January 1856	Bernard O'Reilly	52	Atlantic Ocean	Eldridge was the commander of the SS Pacific when it disappeared under mysterious circumstances while sailing to New York from Liverpool. The bishop of Hartford, Bernard O'Reilly, who was returning from a trip to Europe, was among those lost.	
March 1867	Trevarton Charles Sholl	22	Australia	Sholl, a government official and explorer, was lost at sea when the schooner Emma disappeared during a storm.	
4 December 1872	Captain Benjamin Briggs and crew	37	Atlantic Ocean near Azores	Briggs, his wife Sarah, their daughter Sophia, and all seven crew members were missing when the Mary Celeste was found adrift in choppy seas some 400 mi (640 km) east of the Azores. Their unexplained disappearances are at the core of "one of the most durable mysteries in nautical history".	
4 December 1872	Sarah Elizabeth Briggs	31	Atlantic Ocean near Azores	Briggs, his wife Sarah, their daughter Sophia, and all seven crew members were missing when the Mary Celeste was found adrift in choppy seas some 400 mi (640 km) east of the Azores. Their unexplained disappearances are at the core of "one of the most durable mysteries in nautical history".	
4 December 1872	Sophia Matilda Briggs	2	Atlantic Ocean near Azores	Briggs, his wife Sarah, their daughter Sophia, and all seven crew members were missing when the Mary Celeste was found adrift in choppy seas some 400 mi (640 km) east of the Azores. Their unexplained disappearances are at the core of "one of the most durable mysteries in nautical history".	
c. 14 February 1880	Crew of HMS Atalanta	Various	Atlantic Ocean	HMS Atalanta disappeared while sailing from Royal Naval Dockyard in Bermuda en route to Falmouth, England on 31 January 1880. The vessel is presumed to have sunk in a storm sometime between 12 and 16 February.	
10 October 1880	Lamont Young	28–29	Bermagui, Australia	Young, a government geologist inspecting new gold fields on behalf of the New South Wales Mines Department, together with his assistant Max Schneider, boat owner Thomas Towers and two other men disappeared after leaving Bermagui, New South Wales, Australia in a small boat. The nearby location where the abandoned wreck of their boat was discovered was subsequently named Mystery Bay.	
25 March 1881	John Bristow Hughes	64	Hobson's Bay, Australia	Hughes, an English-Australian grazier and politician of the South Australian colony, is thought to have drowned on vacation while swimming, but his body was never recovered.	
12 September 1881	Charles W. Chipp	33	Laptev Sea	Chipp, an American naval officer and explorer, took part in the Jeannette expedition, which aimed to discover a route from the Pacific Ocean to the Bering Strait. The ship became crushed and sank in June 1881. After a long trek across the ice to the water, the crew set out in three small boats, but later became separated in a storm. The boat that Chipp was commanding was never seen again.	
10 December 1881	Walter Powell	39	English Channel	Walter Powell, a Welsh politician member of the Conservative party member in the House of Commons in between 1868 and 1881 as well as a colliery owner, disappeared in a balloon over the English Channel on 10 December 1881 and was never seen again.	
29 August 1884	Resolven	Various	Labrador, Canada	The merchant ship Resolven was found abandoned off the coast of Labrador on 29 August. A lifeboat was missing and it was assumed that all 11 on board had evacuated in the face of nearby icebergs, but neither they nor the lifeboat were ever found.	
22 July 1886	James Henry Van Alen	66	Atlantic Ocean	A Union Army brigadier general, Van Alen either fell or jumped into the sea while on board the RMS Umbria, while returning home from a trip to England.	
29 September 1889	William Jackson	56	Tasman Sea	Jackson, an English-born New Zealand Member of Parliament who represented the Waikato region from 1872 to 1875, went missing while travelling on board the SS Rotorua. It is presumed he became sick and fell overboard.	
12 July 1890	Archduke Johann Salvator of Austria	37	Cape Horn, Chile (presumed)	A member of the House of Habsburg-Lorraine who renounced his royal titles and went on to live as a sailor, Salvator and his wife were presumably killed when their ship was sunk during a storm in Cape Horn, but other theories have been proposed that Salvator instead assumed a new identity and lived the rest of his days in South America.	
13 March 1892	Hermann Fol	46	Bénodet, France	Fol, a Swiss zoologist regarded as the father of modern cell biology, disappeared with several crew members of his yacht shortly after leaving Bénodet, France.	
26 October 1902	Eduard von Toll	44	East Siberian Sea	A group of Russian explorers led by Baron Eduard von Toll left Bennett Island in Siberia and were never seen again.	
On or after 16 November 1903	Loch Bredan	Unknown	Indian Ocean	In early 1904 speculation and concern about the missing ship appeared in the press. She was never heard from again and no scrap of wreckage was ever found. The crew consisted of: Thomas Williams (master), J. M. Scott (first mate), G. Howell (second mate), J. A. Gibbons (carpenter), C. L. Williams (sailmaker), W. Williams (cook and steward), A. Gaerkens, H. Skinner, D. Friel, T. Williams, T. T. Gunn, J. L. James, G. Hartfield, L. J. Monoghan, C. Burns and S. Thomas (boy). The captain's wife (Mrs. Williams) was also on the articles as stewardess. Five men: N. M. McKenzie, F. Bucknall. R. Leppar, C. Nelson, joined the vessel at Port Adelaide. F. Bucknall was the son of Frederick Estcourt Bucknall, a former parliamentarian, brewer and real estate developer who lost his fortune in a recent recession.	
27 July 1909	Waratah	Various	Mbhashe River, Colony of Natal	The SS Waratah, a 500-foot passenger-and-cargo steamship built in 1908 by the Blue Anchor Line to operate between Europe and Australia, disappeared on her second voyage from Durban to Cape Town with 211 passengers and crew aboard. The last confirmed sighting of her was by a fellow steamer on 27 July, and her ultimate fate remains unknown.	
14 November 1909	Joshua Slocum	65	Martha's Vineyard, Massachusetts, U.S.	Slocum, a Canadian-American sailor and first man to sail single-handedly around the world (1895–1898), disappeared after setting sail from Vineyard Haven on Martha's Vineyard alone, bound for South America, aboard the same 36 ft 9 in (11.20 m) sloop Spray he had used for his circumnavigation.	
22 December 1910	Cecil Grace	30	English Channel	Pioneer aviator Grace disappeared over the English Channel on 22 December 1910 while returning to Eastchurch via Dover from Calais after having gone there to attempt to win the Baron de Forest Prize, but deciding not to due to strong winds. His pilot's goggles and cap were recovered on 6 January 1911, and his body was possibly found on 14 March 1911, but was too badly disfigured to be identifiable.	
5 June 1911	Édouard Bague	32	Mediterranean Sea	Bague, a former lieutenant in the Algerian tirailleurs and aviator, disappeared while attempting to cross the Mediterranean Sea without a compass. Several expeditions to locate the plane or Bague's remains were made, but no trace was ever found.	
18 April 1912	Damer Leslie Allen	34	Irish Sea	Allen, an Irish-born British aviator, disappeared on 18 April 1912 while attempting to fly solo from Holyhead, Wales, to Ireland in a Blériot monoplane.	
c. 1913	Vladimir Rusanov	38	Kara Sea	Rusanov, a Russian geologist and Arctic explorer, led an expedition with the initial goal of establishing mineral claims on Spitsbergen, but later expanded to include investigating the Northeast Passage. They sailed in the Hercules captained by Alexander Kuchin. The expedition was last heard from in August 1912, when Rusanov sent a message stating that he was continuing east, before disappearing a year later in the Kara Sea. Artifacts found decades later show that they managed to cross that sea.	
c. 1913	Alexander Kuchin	24	Kara Sea	Rusanov, a Russian geologist and Arctic explorer, led an expedition with the initial goal of establishing mineral claims on Spitsbergen, but later expanded to include investigating the Northeast Passage. They sailed in the Hercules captained by Alexander Kuchin. The expedition was last heard from in August 1912, when Rusanov sent a message stating that he was continuing east, before disappearing a year later in the Kara Sea. Artifacts found decades later show that they managed to cross that sea.	
13 October 1913	Albert Jewell	27	North Atlantic Ocean	Jewell, an early U.S. aviator, disappeared off Long Island, New York, on 13 October 1913, en route to Oakwood, Staten Island, in order to take part in The New York Times American Aerial Derby.	
23 May 1914	Gustav Hamel	24–25	English Channel	Hamel, a British aviation pioneer who was most prominent for developing and promoting flying in Hendon Aerodrome, disappeared over the English Channel while flying a new plane. In July, a fishing vessel saw a body floating in the ocean, which, although they didn't retrieve it, was believed to be Hamel's.	
18/19 August 1914	Albert Johan Petersson	44	Bergen	Swedish chemist, engineer and industrialist Albert Petersson disappeared during a boat trip from Odda, Norway to Bergen.	
3 December 1914	Harald Kristian Dannevig	43	Macquarie Island	Dannevig, a Norwegian-born Australian superintendent of fisheries for New South Wales, disappeared during an investigation on 3 December 1914.	
c. September 1916	Karl Schwartzkopf	Unknown	Atlantic Ocean	Bremen departed Bremerhaven in September 1916 for Norfolk, Virginia, commanded by Kapitänleutnant Karl Schwartzkopf, and reportedly carrying financial credits for Simon Lake to begin building cargo submarines for Germany. It did not complete this voyage and Bremen's fate is a mystery. Several views have been put forth as to the nature of her fate. German U-boat U-53 had been assigned to join Bremen as protection against British attacks but failed to make contact. Its commander Hans Rose reported having heard a radio broadcast on 28 September 1916 stating that Bremen had been sunk.	
15 April 1917	Marc Armand Ruffer	57	Aegean Sea	Ruffer was a Swiss-born British experimental pathologist and bacteriologist, who is considered a pioneer of modern paleopathology. On 15 April 1917 while travelling to Egypt aboard the SS Arcadian, the ship was sunk by a U-boat. He was last seen two times floating in the sea: first upright and alive and then in a different position, presumably dead. His body was never recovered.	
13 February 1918	René Audry (Commander & 22 crew)	Unknown	Unknown	Bernoulli's final patrol was in February 1918, on close blockade duty off Cattaro. The submarine was not heard from after 13 February 1918 and is believed to have struck a mine off Cattaro and sunk. All 23 of her crew were lost. Her commander, Rene Audry, was honored by having a submarine named after him.	
c. November 1918	Arthur Cravan	33	Salina Cruz, Mexico	Swiss writer, poet, artist, and boxer Arthur Cravan was last seen in Salina Cruz, Mexico around November 1918.	
c. 1919	Paul Knutsen	30	Cape Chelyuskin	Knutsen, a Norwegian seaman who accompanied explorer Roald Amundsen on an expedition to the Arctic, volunteered to accompany Peter Tessem to the telegraph station at Dikson Island. Tessem asked to leave the expedition due to chronic headaches. The pair was also tasked to deliver the mail and scientific reports of the expedition's first year in the ice. A stone hut was built for them on land, and they were instructed to wait for the freeze-up and travel towards Dikson when the opportunity arose, but both disappeared along the way. Tessem's body was found and buried several years later, while Knutsen's was never located.	
26 October 1919	Marie Empress	35	Atlantic Ocean	Empress, a British silent film actress, was last seen in Stateroom 480 on the SS Orduña the night before its arrival in New York City.	
21 February 1920	Croye Pithey	24	Irish Sea	Pithey, a South African flying ace and balloon buster, crashlanded while conducting a ferry operation. Neither his remains nor plane were ever recovered.	
26 January 1921	SS Hewitt	Various	Atlantic Ocean	Hewitt left fully loaded from Sabine Pass, Port Arthur, Texas on 20 January 1921. She was bound for Portland, Maine with a stop in Boston, Massachusetts. She made her regular radio calls on 24 January and 25 January, and reported nothing unusual. She was last seen 250 nmi (460 km) north of Jupiter Inlet, Florida. From that time to this, she remains missing. No further radio signals from her were received. After the Hewitt failed to arrive in Boston on its expected due date of 29 January, Union Sulphur sent the ship's wireless call (K I L) through Atlantic coastal stations, and notified the U.S. Navy. A huge search along her route found nothing.	
31 January 1921	Carroll A. Deering	Various	Cape Hatteras, North Carolina, U.S.	The captain and ten crewmen of the schooner Carroll A. Deering were missing when the schooner was found run aground off Cape Hatteras, North Carolina, on 31 January 1921. A mutiny was suspected, but the reason for their disappearance has never been established.	
26 November 1921	Charles Whittlesey	37	Atlantic Ocean	The American soldier and Medal of Honor recipient who led the "Lost Battalion" in World War I was last seen on the evening of 26 November 1921 on a passenger ship bound from New York City to Havana. It is presumed he committed suicide by jumping overboard.	
20 September 1922	Giuseppe Sartorio	68	Atlantic Ocean	Sartorio, an Italian sculptor, disappeared while travelling on board the steamer Tocra, which was returning to Italy from Canada.	
c. 8 May 1927	Charles Nungesser	31	Atlantic Ocean	Both French aviators disappeared with their Levasseur PL.8 L'Oiseau Blanc while attempting to make the first non-stop transatlantic flight from Paris to New York.	
c. 8 May 1927	François Coli	45	Atlantic Ocean	Both French aviators disappeared with their Levasseur PL.8 L'Oiseau Blanc while attempting to make the first non-stop transatlantic flight from Paris to New York.	
16 August 1927	Mildred Doran	22	Pacific Ocean	The Canadian aviation enthusiast and sole woman to participate in the Dole Air Race vanished at sea like several other competitors and was never found.	
18 August 1927	William Portwood Erwin	28	Pacific Ocean	Lt. Erwin was an American flying ace active during World War I credited with eight aerial victories. He vanished while participating in the Dole Air Race spanning between Oakland, California and Hawaii. He is believed to drowned in the ocean.	
31 August 1927	Frederick F. Minchin	37	Atlantic Ocean	Hamilton, a British flying ace credited with six aerial victories, along with pilot Minchin and the Princess disappeared over the Atlantic Ocean while attempting the first non-stop east–west flight across the Atlantic Ocean. The plane, St. Raphael, owned by passenger Princess Anne, was last seen flying over the Atlantic by an oil tanker and was never seen again.	
31 August 1927	Leslie Hamilton	Unknown	Atlantic Ocean	Hamilton, a British flying ace credited with six aerial victories, along with pilot Minchin and the Princess disappeared over the Atlantic Ocean while attempting the first non-stop east–west flight across the Atlantic Ocean. The plane, St. Raphael, owned by passenger Princess Anne, was last seen flying over the Atlantic by an oil tanker and was never seen again.	
31 August 1927	Princess Anne of Löwenstein-Wertheim-Freudenberg	63	Atlantic Ocean	Hamilton, a British flying ace credited with six aerial victories, along with pilot Minchin and the Princess disappeared over the Atlantic Ocean while attempting the first non-stop east–west flight across the Atlantic Ocean. The plane, St. Raphael, owned by passenger Princess Anne, was last seen flying over the Atlantic by an oil tanker and was never seen again.	
6 September 1927	James DeWitt Hill	45	Atlantic Ocean	Hill and Bertaud were American aviators who disappeared aboard the Old Glory while attempting a transatlantic flight. They were accompanied by Payne, the editor of the New York Daily Mirror. One of the plane's wings was later found off the coast of Cape Race, but no trace of the crew was ever found.	
6 September 1927	Lloyd W. Bertaud	31	Atlantic Ocean	Hill and Bertaud were American aviators who disappeared aboard the Old Glory while attempting a transatlantic flight. They were accompanied by Payne, the editor of the New York Daily Mirror. One of the plane's wings was later found off the coast of Cape Race, but no trace of the crew was ever found.	
6 September 1927	Philip A. Payne	Unknown	Atlantic Ocean	Hill and Bertaud were American aviators who disappeared aboard the Old Glory while attempting a transatlantic flight. They were accompanied by Payne, the editor of the New York Daily Mirror. One of the plane's wings was later found off the coast of Cape Race, but no trace of the crew was ever found.	
23 December 1927	Oskar Omdal	31	Atlantic Ocean	In 23 December 1927, Grayson, pilot Omdal, navigator Goldsborough, and radio engineer Koehler took off from Curtiss Field in order to set the record for the first woman to cross the Atlantic, but the plane disappeared at sea. No trace of either the plane or the crew has been found since.	
23 December 1927	Frances Wilson Grayson	35	Atlantic Ocean	In 23 December 1927, Grayson, pilot Omdal, navigator Goldsborough, and radio engineer Koehler took off from Curtiss Field in order to set the record for the first woman to cross the Atlantic, but the plane disappeared at sea. No trace of either the plane or the crew has been found since.	
23 December 1927	Brice Goldsborough	38	Atlantic Ocean	In 23 December 1927, Grayson, pilot Omdal, navigator Goldsborough, and radio engineer Koehler took off from Curtiss Field in order to set the record for the first woman to cross the Atlantic, but the plane disappeared at sea. No trace of either the plane or the crew has been found since.	
23 December 1927	Frank Koehler	Unknown	Atlantic Ocean	In 23 December 1927, Grayson, pilot Omdal, navigator Goldsborough, and radio engineer Koehler took off from Curtiss Field in order to set the record for the first woman to cross the Atlantic, but the plane disappeared at sea. No trace of either the plane or the crew has been found since.	
10 January 1928	John Moncrieff	34	Tasman Sea	The pair of New Zealanders were the first to attempt the Trans-Tasman flight from New Zealand to nearby Australia. After their departure from Sydney, neither the pilots or the aircraft were ever seen again.	
10 January 1928	George Hood	37	Tasman Sea	The pair of New Zealanders were the first to attempt the Trans-Tasman flight from New Zealand to nearby Australia. After their departure from Sydney, neither the pilots or the aircraft were ever seen again.	
13 March 1928	Walter G. R. Hinchliffe	34	Atlantic Ocean	Hinchliffe, a decorated flying ace, and Mackay, an actress and aviation pioneer, attempted to cross the Atlantic Ocean in a bid for Mackay to become the first woman to have succeeded in the transatlantic flight. The plane was last seen near the west of Cork, Ireland, but nothing more is known of it.	
13 March 1928	Elsie Mackay	34	Atlantic Ocean	Hinchliffe, a decorated flying ace, and Mackay, an actress and aviation pioneer, attempted to cross the Atlantic Ocean in a bid for Mackay to become the first woman to have succeeded in the transatlantic flight. The plane was last seen near the west of Cork, Ireland, but nothing more is known of it.	
25 May 1928	Aldo Pontremoli	32	Arctic Ocean	Italian physicist Pontremoli joined the polar expedition of General Umberto Nobile who was in command of the airship Italia. The airship crash-landed on ice, after which the airship envelope drifted away and disappeared while carrying Pontremoli, who was observed as alive and conscious, and five other people.	
18 June 1928	Roald Amundsen	55	Barents Sea	Norwegian polar region explorer Amundsen, French pilot Guilbaud and Norwegian pilot Dietrichson disappeared in the Arctic along with the French crew of the Latham 47, co-pilot Albert Cavelier de Cur, mechanic Gilbert Georges Paul Brazy, and radio operator Emile Valette on 18 June 1928, while flying on a rescue mission for the missing members of the crew of Umberto Nobile's airship Italia over the Barents Sea. The search for Amundsen and his team was called off in September 1928 by the Norwegian Government. No bodies were ever found.	
18 June 1928	René Guilbaud	37	Barents Sea		
18 June 1928	Leif Dietrichson	37	Barents Sea		
18 June 1928	Albert Cavelier de Cuverville	35	Barents Sea		
18 June 1928	Gilbert Georges Paul Brazy	26	Barents Sea		
18 June 1928	Emile Valette	28	Barents Sea		
3 October 1931	Lauro De Bosis	29	Tyrrhenian Sea	De Bosis, an Italian poet, aviator and anti-fascist, took off from Marseille on a small Klemm L 25 heading for Corsica and then Italy. He reached Rome and circled over the city centre for a half hour, dropping thousands of antifascist leaflets. Before the Italian Air Force could arrive, he had flown off to sea for Corsica, never to be seen again.	
3 December 1934	Charles Ulm	36	Pacific Ocean	Ulm was an Australian aviator who, together with Sir Charles Kingsford Smith, was the founder of the Australian National Airways. In December 1934, he, his copilot and his navigator disappeared in the Pacific Ocean during a test flight from Oakland, California to Hawaii in the aircraft Stella Australis.	
8 November 1935	Charles Kingsford Smith	38	Andaman Sea	Australian pioneer aviator Charles Kingsford Smith and co-pilot Tommy Pethybridge disappeared during an overnight flight from Allahabad, India, to Singapore while attempting to break the England–Australia speed record. Eighteen months later, Burmese fishermen found an undercarriage leg and wheel (with its tire still inflated) on the shoreline of Aye Island in the Andaman Sea, 3 km (2 mi) off the south-east coastline of Burma, which Lockheed confirmed to be from their Lockheed Altair, the Lady Southern Cross. Botanists who examined the weeds clinging to it estimated that the aircraft itself lies not far from the island at a depth of approximately 15 fathoms (90 ft; 27 m). A filmmaker claimed to have located Lady Southern Cross on the seabed in February 2009.	
8 November 1935	Tommy Pethybridge	Unknown	Andaman Sea		
10 February 1936	Émile Barrière	33	South Atlantic Ocean	Barrière, an early-20th-century French aviator who played a major role in the early development commercial aviation in South America, was a passenger on an Air France Latécoère 301 Ville de Buenos Aires which disappeared en route from Natal, Brazil to Dakar, French West Africa on 10 February 1936.	
October 1936	Brian Abbot	24–25	Tasman Sea	Brian Abbot was the stage name of Australian actor George Rikard Bell, who along with his sidekick and fellow actor Leslie Hay-Simpson mysteriously disappeared after setting out from Lord Howe Island for Sydney in October 1936; they were never seen again despite a week long search having taken place to find them. A significant number of boats have disappeared around the same area where Abbot and Hay-Simpson disappeared. A boat with five men from Sydney also mysteriously vanished a few weeks after the disappearance of Abbot and Hay-Simpson and was also never seen again.	
October 1936	Leslie Hay-Simpson	Unknown	Tasman Sea		
10 November 1936	James Jenkins Simpson	54	Aegean Sea	Simpson, a British entomologist and marine biologist, was last seen at sea on the morning of 10 November 1936 and is believed to have drowned.	
2 July 1937	Amelia Earhart	39	Central Pacific Ocean	American aviator Amelia Earhart was the first woman to try a circumnavigational flight of the globe. During the attempt, she and her navigator, Fred Noonan, disappeared over the central Pacific in the vicinity of Howland Island on 2 July 1937.	
2 July 1937	Fred Noonan	44	Central Pacific Ocean	American aviator Amelia Earhart was the first woman to try a circumnavigational flight of the globe. During the attempt, she and her navigator, Fred Noonan, disappeared over the central Pacific in the vicinity of Howland Island on 2 July 1937.	
13 August 1937	Sigizmund Levanevsky	35	Arctic Ocean	Levanevsky, a Soviet aviator, with his crew of five and their Bolkhovitinov DB-A aircraft disappeared in the vicinity of the North Pole on the Arctic Ocean. They had reported a loss of power from one of their four Mikulin AM-34 engines while attempting to prove a transpolar route between Asia and North America commercially viable.	
25 March 1938	Ettore Majorana	32	Tyrrhenian Sea	An Italian physicist, Majorana disappeared in unknown circumstances during a boat trip from Palermo to Naples on 25 March 1938. There is some evidence that he was alive in South America in 1959 and that his disappearance was voluntary.	
20 March 1939	William Snodgrass	68–69	Cook Strait	Snodgrass, a New Zealand politician, disappeared from the inter-island ferry Arahura while travelling overnight from Wellington to Nelson on 20 March 1939.	
24 March 1939	Richard Halliburton	39	Pacific Ocean	Halliburton, an American travel writer and adventurer, vanished while attempting to sail the Sea Dragon, a Chinese junk, across the Pacific Ocean, accompanied by photojournalist Paul Mooney. No confirmed wreckage has ever been located, although flotsam seen in 1940 may have been from the craft.	
24 March 1939	Paul Mooney	34	Pacific Ocean	Halliburton, an American travel writer and adventurer, vanished while attempting to sail the Sea Dragon, a Chinese junk, across the Pacific Ocean, accompanied by photojournalist Paul Mooney. No confirmed wreckage has ever been located, although flotsam seen in 1940 may have been from the craft.	
1 March 1940	Harold Whistler	43	Gulf of Oman	Whistler, an English fighter pilot and flying ace, and Pannirselvam, an Indian attorney and politician, along with 6 others disappeared on board the Handley Page H.P.42 Hannibal while returning to the UK from a trip to India.	
1 March 1940	A. T. Pannirselvam	51	Gulf of Oman	Whistler, an English fighter pilot and flying ace, and Pannirselvam, an Indian attorney and politician, along with 6 others disappeared on board the Handley Page H.P.42 Hannibal while returning to the UK from a trip to India.	
3 September 1940	Elroy Guckert	40	Location unknown	Guckert, an American football and basketball coach, is said to have died in 1940 when he disappeared from a ship but his body was never recovered and he was never seen, so his fate remains unknown.	
28 November 1940	Helmut Wick	25	English Channel	Wick, a German Luftwaffe flying ace and wing commander credited with 56 aerial victories against the Allied powers, was shot down by British forces during the Battle of Britain. His body was never found.	
28 November 1940	John Dundas	25	English Channel	Dundas, an English RAF pilot and fighter ace believed to have shot down Helmut Wick, Nazi Germany's deadliest flying ace, was purportedly shot down himself moments later. His body was also never found.	
5 January 1941	Amy Johnson	37	Thames Estuary, England	An English pioneer pilot who was the first woman to fly solo from London to Australia, Johnson disappeared during a ferry flight after being blown off course due to bad weather and bailing out into the Thames Estuary, presumably dying.	
20 April 1941	Luigi Barbesino	46	Mediterranean Sea	Barbesino, an Italian association footballer and manager who represented his country at the 1912 Summer Olympics, later abandoned his job to serve in the Regia Aeronautica. During a training course, he and his six crewmen went missing during bad weather and were never seen again.	
12 May 1941	Zdzisław Henneberg	30	English Channel	Polish RAF airman and flying ace Henneberg ditched his plane in the English Channel during the Battle of Britain. He was last seen floating in the water, but a two-day search was unable to find him.	
30 November 1941	Esmond Romilly	23	North Sea	Romilly, a British socialist and journalist, disappeared during a bombing raid on Hamburg, with neither his body or the plane's wreckage ever being found.	
14 April 1942	David Wanklyn	30	Mediterranean Sea	Wanklyn disappeared along with his crew while aboard HMS Upholder on 14 April 1942 in the Mediterranean Sea and is believed to have been killed.	
5 May 1942	Gerhard Köppen	23	Sea of Azov, Russia	Gerhard Köppen was a German Luftwaffe flying ace as well as a recipient of the Knight's Cross with Oak Leaves who disappeared on 5 May 1942 after he was last seen swimming in the Sea of Azov with Soviet boats going after him. He was officially declared dead on 30 May 1969.	
8 May 1942	William B. Ault	43	Chuuk State, Federated States of Micronesia	Ault, a U.S. Navy commander, disappeared together with his radioman, William T. Butler, during the Battle of the Coral Sea. Neither man's remains were ever recovered.	
5 June 1942	Samuel Adams	30	Pacific theatre	Samuel Adams was an officer in the United States Navy who disappeared on 5 June 1942 while flying in the Pacific theatre; he is believed to have been shot down.	
August 1942	Jose Gozar	23–24	Tanon Strait, Philippines	The Filipino military aviator and flight officer of the Army Air Corps was presumably lost at sea with another officer while attempting to reach Mindoro under unfavorable weather conditions.	
16 August 1942	Lt. Ernest Cody	27	San Francisco Bay, California, U.S.	U.S. Navy blimp L-8 drifted inland from its route doing antisubmarine patrol off the coast of California near San Francisco several hours after its crew, Lt. Ernest Cody and Ens. Charles Adams, radioed in that they were going to take a closer look at an oil slick. When the ship eventually crashed in Daly City, neither man was aboard. A massive search failed to find any trace of them; they were both declared dead a year later.	
16 August 1942	Ens. Charles Adams	38	San Francisco Bay, California, U.S.	U.S. Navy blimp L-8 drifted inland from its route doing antisubmarine patrol off the coast of California near San Francisco several hours after its crew, Lt. Ernest Cody and Ens. Charles Adams, radioed in that they were going to take a closer look at an oil slick. When the ship eventually crashed in Daly City, neither man was aboard. A massive search failed to find any trace of them; they were both declared dead a year later.	
13 December 1942	Brian Lane	25	North Sea	Lane, a British author and RAF flying ace, is thought to have been shot down by an enemy plane while flying over the North Sea. His remains have never been recovered.	
5 April 1943	Denver V. Truelove	24	Mediterranean Sea	A USAAF bombardier and member of the Doolittle Raiders who took part in bombing Japan in April 1942. The following year, while he and several others were participating in a bombing raid in Sicily, Italy, their plane was shot down. Truelove and two others' remains were never recovered.	
8 July 1943	Kenji Tsukagoshi	43	Indian Ocean	Tsukagoshi, a Japanese aviator and explorer, disappeared after departing from Singapore for Crimea in the prototype Tachikawa Ki-77.	
13 July 1943	Geoffrey Appleyard	26	Mediterranean Sea near Sicily, Italy	British Army officer Appleyard disappeared on a return flight from the Allied invasion of Sicily. His aircraft was never located, and it is presumed he was shot down by friendly fire.	
4 October 1943	Ernest Melville Charles Guest	23	Bay of Biscay	A Southern Rhodesian RAF pilot, Guest was last seen on 4 October 1943 when he was fighting six Ju 88s while on patrol with another plane. He was pronounced missing in January 1944.	
4 October 1943	Erwin Clausen	32	North Sea	Clausen, a German Luftwaffe military aviator and fighter ace who fought in multiple large-scale invasions and operations, was posted as missing in action on 4 October 1943 during a defence of the Reich mission.	
c. 31 October 1943	Jack Kraynick	29	Caribbean Sea	Kraynick, an American football back who played for the North Carolina Tar Heels, and later a first lieutenant in the USAAF, disappeared while flying over the Caribbean Sea and is presumed to have died.	
14 February 1944	Theodore Kara	27	Pacific Ocean	Theodore Kara was an American boxer and a United States Army Air Corps radioman who disappeared on 14 February 1944 while flying over the Pacific Ocean and was never seen or heard from again.	
20 April 1944	Gerry Atwell	27	Adriatic Sea	Atwell, an Australian rugby footballer who served as a pilot in the RAAF, disappeared during a bombing raid on Italy. His remains were never recovered.	
9 July 1944	Ingvar Fredrik Håkansson	23	English Channel	The English-born Swedish volunteer fighter pilot for the RAF disappeared after having to eject from his aircraft. Neither he nor his plane were ever recovered.	
26 July 1944	USS Robalo crewmen	Various	South China Sea	Although the U.S. Navy claimed the submarine USS Robalo was lost with all hands after failing to report while on a July 1944 patrol in the Philippines, Lt. Cmdr. Manning Kimmel (31) and three other crewmen are known to have survived. A note recovered by an Army prisoner of war claimed the four had been arrested as spies after reaching Palawan Island following the Robalo's 26 July collision with a Japanese mine just offshore. Another witness account says they were massacred following an air raid later that year but Japanese records do not indicate they were being held at the camp in question at that time. It is believed that they were killed in captivity, but officially their fate is still unknown.	
26 July 1944	Leon Vance	27	Atlantic Ocean	Vance was a decorated veteran of World War II, serving in the United States Army Air Forces. He, and all aboard a C-54 Skymaster, disappeared while travelling across the Atlantic Ocean from England to the United States. This aircraft is believed to have crashed somewhere between Iceland and Newfoundland.	
31 July 1944	Antoine de Saint-Exupéry	44	Mediterranean Sea	French author Antoine de Saint-Exupéry, who disappeared over the Mediterranean on a reconnaissance mission during July 1944, is believed to have died at that time. In August, an unidentifiable body, wearing a French uniform, was found in the sea near Carqueiranne and was buried there. In 2000, the wreckage of the aircraft flown by Saint-Exupéry was found on the seabed near Marseille.	
26 August 1944	Toshio Kuroiwa	35	Off the Malay Peninsula	Japanese IJN warrant officer and fighter pilot Kuroiwa participated in one of the first official shootdowns of enemy aircraft during the January 28 incident in 1932. After retiring from service, he and the civilian transport aircraft he was piloting disappeared off the Malay Peninsula, never to be seen again.	
29 October 1944	Alfonza W. Davis	24	Adriatic Sea	Davis, an American aviator and member of the Tuskegee Airmen, disappeared during a reconnaissance mission over the Adriatic Sea off the coast of Italy. He was presumed to have been killed, but his remains have never been found.	
7 November 1944	Clint Castleberry	21	Liberia	Clint Castleberry was an American college football player and later a USAAF Lieutenant who disappeared on 7 November 1944 after taking off from Roberts Field in Liberia with another plane, and was later presumed dead after a Royal Air Force plane saw unidentified wreckage that was thought to have been from one of the planes.	
8 November 1944	Peter Deinboll	29	North Sea	Deinboll, a Norwegian engineer and resistance fighter who took part in sabotage operations against German locomotives, disappeared in transit between the United Kingdom and Norway and was never seen again.	
22 November 1944	Johan Pitka	72	Baltic Sea	Pitka was an Estonian navy commander and prominent fighter in the Estonian War of Independence. In 1944, he returned to his country from his exile in Finland to fight against the Soviet occupying forces, but is thought to have been killed in action.	
15 December 1944	Glenn Miller	40	English Channel	An American big band leader and recording artist, Miller went missing on the night of 15 December 1944 in a U.S. Army UC-64 Norseman that disappeared over the English Channel while en route from the United Kingdom to Paris, France. Miller was on the flight to make arrangements for his band to entertain Allied servicemen.	
26 February 1945	Millard Harmon	57	Pacific Ocean	Harmon, a United States Army Air Forces lieutenant general and one of the highest-ranking Americans to die in World War II, his chief of staff Brigadier General Andersen, and pilot Savage disappeared while traveling between Kwajalein Atoll and Hawaii. The aircraft was never recovered.	
26 February 1945	James Roy Andersen	40	Pacific Ocean	Harmon, a United States Army Air Forces lieutenant general and one of the highest-ranking Americans to die in World War II, his chief of staff Brigadier General Andersen, and pilot Savage disappeared while traveling between Kwajalein Atoll and Hawaii. The aircraft was never recovered.	
26 February 1945	F. E. Savage	Unknown	Pacific Ocean	Harmon, a United States Army Air Forces lieutenant general and one of the highest-ranking Americans to die in World War II, his chief of staff Brigadier General Andersen, and pilot Savage disappeared while traveling between Kwajalein Atoll and Hawaii. The aircraft was never recovered.	
27 March 1945	Peter Drummond	50	North Atlantic Ocean	Drummond, an Australian-born RAF senior commander, and Brabner, a British MP, along with many others, disappeared with the Consolidated Liberator II Commando while on a flight from RAF Northolt to Lajes Field in the Azores, en route to Ottawa in Canada.	
27 March 1945	Rupert Brabner	33	North Atlantic Ocean	Drummond, an Australian-born RAF senior commander, and Brabner, a British MP, along with many others, disappeared with the Consolidated Liberator II Commando while on a flight from RAF Northolt to Lajes Field in the Azores, en route to Ottawa in Canada.	
1 August 1945	Naoshi Kanno	23	Off Yakushima, Ōsumi Islands, Japan	A Japanese fighter ace with twenty-five confirmed kills, Kanno went missing off the island of Yakushima on 1 August 1945. His remains were never found.	
30 January 1948	Sir Arthur Coningham	53	Bermuda Triangle	A retired RAF Air Marshal, Sir Arthur Coningham disappeared when an Avro Tudor IV, G-AHNP Star Tiger, went missing over the western Atlantic. He was one of 25 passengers, together with six crewmen, who were lost when the flight from Santa Maria Airport in the Azores failed to reach its destination of Kindley Field, Bermuda. Star Tiger's sister aircraft G-AGRE Star Ariel also disappeared over the western Atlantic, with the loss of all seven crewmen and 13 passengers, while flying from Bermuda to Kingston Airport, Jamaica, the following year.	
8 June 1952	David Atcherley	48	Mediterranean Sea	A decorated Royal Air Force officer, Atcherley was lost at sea while on a 40-minute flight from Egypt to Nicosia, Cyprus. Despite extensive searches from British, Israeli, Turkish and American aircraft, neither he or his plane have ever been located.	
7 February 1953	Holchu's 5 crew members	Various	Indian Ocean	The Holchu, a small cargo ship, was sighted adrift in the Indian Ocean on 7 February 1953, around 200 mi (320 km) south of the Nicobar Islands, by HMT Empire Windrush. She was later boarded by the crew of a British cargo ship, alerted by Windrush's radio warning. They found no trace of the crew and the Holchu was towed to Colombo. Holchu was carrying a cargo of rice and was in good condition, aside from a broken mast. Adequate supplies of food, water and fuel were found, and a meal had been prepared in the ship's galley. The fate of the Holchu's crew remains unknown.	
10 November 1955	Joyita	Various	South Pacific Ocean	On 10 November, the 69 ft (21 m) merchant vessel Joyita was found abandoned, partially submerged and listing heavily to port, north of the Pacific island of Vanua Levu, part of Fiji. There was no sign of the 25 passengers and crew who had been aboard when it was last seen on its departure from Apia, Samoa five weeks earlier. An extensive investigation has failed to find any trace of the passengers or crew.	
23 November 1955	SS Empire Adur	Various	Unknown	SS Empire Adur served for a further seven years but went missing under tow by the Philippines registered tug Albacore to Hong Kong for scrapping. Both vessels were presumed lost. Her last reported position was north of the Paracel Islands at 17°56′N 113°45′E on 23 November 1955.	
10 March 1956	Robert H. Hodgin	31	Mediterranean Sea	Three United States Air Force airmen, commander Captain Robert H. Hodgin, observer Captain Gordon M. Insley and pilot 2nd Lt. Ronald L. Kurtz disappeared when their B-47 failed to make contact with an aerial refueling tanker at 14,000 ft over the Mediterranean Sea. While the unarmed aircraft was transporting two different capsules of nuclear weapons material in carrying cases, a nuclear detonation was not possible.	
10 March 1956	Gordon M. Insley	32	Mediterranean Sea	Three United States Air Force airmen, commander Captain Robert H. Hodgin, observer Captain Gordon M. Insley and pilot 2nd Lt. Ronald L. Kurtz disappeared when their B-47 failed to make contact with an aerial refueling tanker at 14,000 ft over the Mediterranean Sea. While the unarmed aircraft was transporting two different capsules of nuclear weapons material in carrying cases, a nuclear detonation was not possible.	
10 March 1956	Ronald L. Kurtz	22	Mediterranean Sea	Three United States Air Force airmen, commander Captain Robert H. Hodgin, observer Captain Gordon M. Insley and pilot 2nd Lt. Ronald L. Kurtz disappeared when their B-47 failed to make contact with an aerial refueling tanker at 14,000 ft over the Mediterranean Sea. While the unarmed aircraft was transporting two different capsules of nuclear weapons material in carrying cases, a nuclear detonation was not possible.	
29 April 1956	Lionel "Buster" Crabb	46	Portsmouth Harbour	Crabb, a retired British Royal Navy frogman, disappeared during an MI6 mission to spy on the Soviet Sverdlov-class cruiser Ordzhonikidze. The coroner concluded that a body (missing its head and hands) in a frogman suit found floating in Chichester Harbour the following year was Crabb's but a positive identification was never made nor cause of death determined.	
July 1958	Lynne C. Quiggle	52	North Pacific Ocean	An American rear admiral serving in the Navy, Quiggle disappeared aboard the SS President Cleveland on his way back to California from a trip to Tokyo. His body was never found, and he is officially listed as "lost at sea" due to unknown circumstances.	
9 November 1958	Harry Frank Broadbent	48	Atlantic Ocean	Broadbent, a British pilot who took part in air racing and record-breaking flights in the 1930s, piloted Martin PBM Mariner CS-THB named "Porto Santo" from Cabo Ruivo Seaplane Base near Lisbon, headed for Funchal, Madeira. Accompanied by co-pilot Rowell, 4 other crew and 30 passengers, a radio message code "QUG" (meaning "I am forced to land immediately") was received when the plane would have been over the Atlantic. No trace of the aircraft or its occupants was subsequently found.	
9 November 1958	Thomas Rowell	Unknown	Atlantic Ocean	Broadbent, a British pilot who took part in air racing and record-breaking flights in the 1930s, piloted Martin PBM Mariner CS-THB named "Porto Santo" from Cabo Ruivo Seaplane Base near Lisbon, headed for Funchal, Madeira. Accompanied by co-pilot Rowell, 4 other crew and 30 passengers, a radio message code "QUG" (meaning "I am forced to land immediately") was received when the plane would have been over the Atlantic. No trace of the aircraft or its occupants was subsequently found.	
28 October 1959	Camilo Cienfuegos	27	Straits of Florida	A Cuban revolutionary and friend of Fidel Castro, Camilo Cienfuegos disappeared when his Cessna 310 went missing over the Straits of Florida during a night flight from Camagüey to Havana.	
9 September 1961	David Kenyon Webster	39	Pacific Ocean near Santa Monica, California, U.S.	Webster was a journalist for the Los Angeles Daily News, The Saturday Evening Post and a World War II veteran with "Easy" Company of the 506th Parachute Infantry Regiment, 101st Airborne Division (the subject of the book and miniseries Band of Brothers). He disappeared while shark fishing near the Santa Monica coast and is presumed to have drowned.	
16 June 1962	Private Colin Luke	21	Gibraltar/Straits of Gibraltar	A soldier in the 1st Battalion, Somerset and Cornwall Light Infantry Regiment, went missing while attempting to swim alone around the Rock of Gibraltar from Little Bay to Eastern Beach. His clothes were found in Little Bay by Police Constable Conroy. Private Gordon Ashworth was the last person to see Colin Luke at Europa Point Barracks before he disappeared.	
11 October 1964	Holly Roth	48	Atlantic Ocean	Roth, an American crime novelist, disappeared on 11 October 1964 while sailing on a ketch with her husband 20 miles north of Safi, Morocco. They departed Gibraltar for the Canary Islands on 8 October 1964. Her husband reported her missing about 4 a.m. while she was on watch, and reported a collision with another vessel. Her body was never recovered.	
17 January 1967	Audrey Bruce Currier	33	Coast of San Juan, Puerto Rico	American heiress Audrey Bruce Currier and her husband Stephen Currier, wealthy philanthropists described as one of the richest young couples in the world, vanished at sea sometime after 7:30 p.m. on the evening of 17 January 1967, on a routine 76 mi (122 km) charter flight from San Juan, Puerto Rico to St. Thomas in the Virgin Islands. Their plane, a Piper Apache piloted by John D. Watson (52) of Airplane Charters Inc., was last heard from when the pilot radioed at 7:30 p.m. for permission to overfly the U.S. Naval base at Isla Culebra, which was denied. The plane was never seen or heard from again. Because the pilot had failed to file a flight plan, the search for the plane did not commence until 5 a.m., nine hours after it failed to arrive in St. Thomas. Despite an extensive air–sea search by the U.S. Coast Guard, no trace of the plane or its passengers was ever found. Audrey Currier was a granddaughter of the financier Andrew Mellon and the daughter of senior US diplomat David K. E. Bruce, while her husband Stephen was the son of socialite Mary Warburg. The Curriers had for the previous ten years provided millions of dollars in financial support to the civil rights movement in the U.S. through the Taconic Foundation and an umbrella group they founded, the Council for United Civil Rights Leadership.	
17 January 1967	Stephen Currier	36	Coast of San Juan, Puerto Rico		
17 December 1967	Harold Holt	59	Cheviot Beach, Australia	Holt, the Prime Minister of Australia, disappeared while swimming in heavy surf at a beach notorious for strong and dangerous rip currents. Despite one of the largest search-and-rescue operations ever mounted in Australia, his body was never found.	
1968	Arthur Piver	58	Atlantic Ocean	Piver was an American boatbuilder credited with pioneering the design of the multihull. An eager amateur sailor, Piver set out to participate in the 1968 Single-Handed Trans-Atlantic Race, but was never seen again.	
22 May 1969	Paul Meyer	23	English Channel	Meyer, a USAF aircraft mechanic, stole a Lockheed C-130 Hercules while on a drinking binge, which he later crashed in the English Channel. The wreckage's remains were only discovered in 2018.	
10 July 1969	Donald Crowhurst	36	Atlantic Ocean	Crowhurst was a competitor in the Sunday Times Golden Globe single-handed nonstop around-the-world yacht race. An inexperienced yachtsman, Crowhurst fabricated his progress in the race through fake log entries, the last of which being dated 1 July 1969. His boat was found abandoned on 10 July 1969.	

== 1970–present ==
Date	Person(s)	Age	Missing from	Circumstances	Ref.
c. 1971	Francis Brenton	44	Atlantic Ocean	Brenton, an English writer, explorer and adventurer who travelled around the world, mostly around the Americas and Africa, supposedly disappeared c. 1971 while sailing back to England.	
16 October 1972	Hale Boggs	58	Gulf of Alaska	Louisiana congressman who, together with friend and fellow congressman Nick Begich, at-large representative from Alaska, disappeared while flying over the Gulf of Alaska en route from Anchorage to Juneau. Their bodies were never found and they were declared legally dead two months later.	
16 October 1972	Nick Begich	40	Gulf of Alaska	Louisiana congressman who, together with friend and fellow congressman Nick Begich, at-large representative from Alaska, disappeared while flying over the Gulf of Alaska en route from Anchorage to Juneau. Their bodies were never found and they were declared legally dead two months later.	
28 March 1973	Henry E. Stebbins	68	Atlantic Ocean	Stebbins, an American ambassador to Uganda, apparently fell overboard while travelling on the SS Leonardo da Vinci and was considered lost at sea, his body never being found.	
21 February 1974	Thomas Leigh Gatch Jr.	48	Atlantic Ocean, near the Canary Islands	American balloonist Thomas Gatch disappeared while attempting to become the first human to cross the Atlantic by balloon. A day after lifting off from Harrisburg Airport on 18 February, his balloon named Light Heart lost radio contact. On 21 February, it was sighted by a ship about 1,600 km west of the Canary Islands but it has not been seen since.	
9 July 1975	Bas Jan Ader	33	Atlantic Ocean	Ader, a Dutch conceptual artist, performance artist, photographer and filmmaker, was lost at sea sometime after 9 July 1975 while attempting to cross the Atlantic Ocean from the U.S. to England in the smallest boat ever. His deserted vessel was found off the coast of Ireland on 18 April 1976 but offered few clues as to his fate.	
1977	Bill Tilman	79	Atlantic Ocean	Tilman, an English mountaineer and explorer renowned for his sailing voyages and climbings of the Himalayan mountains, was invited as a crew member on the En Avant in 1977, with the final destination being Smith Island. However, the boat was presumably lost at sea near the Falkland Islands, with everybody on board perishing.	
October 1977	Slim Wintermute	60	Portage Bay, Washington, U.S.	Wintermute, an American collegiate and professional basketball player, disappeared in October 1977, after setting out in his yacht from Portage Bay. His boat was found a few days later with one of his friends asleep on board; foul play was not suspected.	
17 March 1978	Eddie Aikau	31	Hawaii, U.S.	Aikau, a Hawaiian lifeguard and surfer, disappeared on 17 March 1978 when he was lost at sea while attempting to reach the island of Lanai on a surfboard. The long-distance Hawaiian outrigger, the Hōkūleʻa, on which he was a crew member, began taking on water 20 miles off Molokai. He was last seen paddling his surfboard towards Lanai to get help.	
November 1978	Alain Colas	35	Atlantic Ocean	Colas, a French sailor who was the first to complete a solitary round-the-world race in a multihull, disappeared while participating in the first Route du Rhum in his boat Manureva. Neither he nor his boat were ever found.	
7 July 1979	Ian Mackintosh	40	Gulf of Alaska, U.S.	Ian Mackintosh, the creator and writer of The Sandbaggers, a British television series, was flying with two others over the Gulf of Alaska in a light aircraft on 7 July 1979. The plane sent out a distress signal which was picked up by the United States Coast Guard. The plane's last known position was searched, but no wreckage of it was ever found, and its passengers have not been heard from since.	
23 December 1979	Jon Mathews	47	Indian Ocean	Mathews, an American adventurer and yachtsman, together with his wife Jean attempted to circumnavigate the world on their vessel, the Drambuie II. While heading towards Durban, South Africa, they sailed into the path of Cyclone Claudette and were presumably killed in the process.	
5 August 1980	Alan Addis	19	East Falkland, Falkland Islands	The Royal Marine Alan Addis went missing on 5 August 1980. His small unit was on a patrol to North Arm in Lafonia on East Falkland. Addis was last seen at 1:30 a.m. after the marines had attended a local function in the social hall of the remote and small community. He was not missed until the other members of his team had set sail on a steamer to take them back to their base at Port Stanley. The official report assumes he drowned, but investigations and rumours have led to a belief that he was murdered. No body or trace has been found.	
October 1980	Angus Primrose	53	South Carolina, U.S.	The designer and naval architect Primrose went missing at sea during October 1980 and is presumed to have drowned.	
September 1985	Art Scholl	53	California	Scholl was an American aerobatic pilot, aerial cameraman, flight instructor and educator based in Riverside, Southern California. He died during the filming of Top Gun when his Pitts S-2 camera plane failed to recover from a spin and plunged into the Pacific Ocean. Scholl had entered the spin intentionally in order to capture it on film using on-board cameras. Observers watched the plane continue to spin as it descended past the planned recovery altitude. The plane impacted the ocean about five miles (8 km) off the coast, near Carlsbad, California. The exact cause of the crash was never determined. Neither the aircraft nor Scholl's body were ever recovered.	
July 1986	Svante Odén	62	Baltic Sea	A Swedish soil scientist, meteorologist and chemist, Odén was testing a top-secret newly invented device that could detect submarines in late July 1986. During this test, he disappeared at the Baltic Sea near the Roslagen, Stockholm archipelago, and presumably died.	
2 August 1987	Clement Howell	52	Atlantic Ocean	Howell, a Turks and Caicos Islands politician and interim member of the advisory council, disappeared with four other people when their plane presumably crashed into the sea on 2 August 1987. Neither the wreckage nor the bodies were ever found.	
11 September 1990	1990 Faucett Perú Boeing 727	Various	South-east of Cape Race, Newfoundland	1990 Faucett Perú Boeing 727 was a airliner that mysteriously disappeared on 11 September 1990 in an area of the Atlantic Ocean in Newfoundland. No one knows what became of the aircraft or its passengers.	
21 May 1995	Larry Hillblom	52	Mariana Islands	Hillblom, a co-founder of the DHL Worldwide shipping company, was on board a plane that went down in the Northern Mariana Islands on 21 May 1995. The bodies of the pilot and other passengers were found but no trace of Hillblom has ever been found. His house in Saipan was found to have had areas where DNA might be found washed down with acid and artifacts with DNA traces buried in the backyard in an apparent effort to prevent any possible claimants to his estate from proving Hillblom had been their father.	
12 November 1995	Bruno Bréguet	45	Ionian Sea	Bréguet, a Swiss-born associate of terrorist Carlos the Jackal, was last seen on a ferry from Italy to Greece 12 November 1995. His family suspected he had been murdered and a body found in Greece might have been his, but authorities remain uncertain.	
January 1997	Gerry Roufs	44	Pacific Ocean	Canadian competitive sailor Roufs vanished at sea while competing in the Vendée Globe yacht race. His boat, the Groupe LG 2, was found off the coast of Chile in July 1997, but Roufs himself was never located.	
14 February 1997	Grant Hadwin	47	Hecate Strait, British Columbia	Hadwin, an anti-logging activist, went missing 14 February 1997 while traveling by kayak across the Hecate Strait to Graham Island near British Columbia to face criminal charges for cutting down Kiidk'yaas, a rare golden spruce tree revered by the Haida people. The wreckage of his kayak was discovered in June but no trace of Hadwin himself has been found.	
25 January 1998	Tom Lonergan	34	Coral Sea, Australia	Tom and Eileen Lonergan, a married couple from Baton Rouge, Louisiana, disappeared when they were mistakenly stranded in the Coral Sea after a scuba dive on 25 January 1998. Eileen's father, John Hains, later said that he suspects the couple ultimately became dehydrated and disoriented and in the end succumbed to drowning or sharks.	
25 January 1998	Eileen Lonergan	29	Coral Sea, Australia	Tom and Eileen Lonergan, a married couple from Baton Rouge, Louisiana, disappeared when they were mistakenly stranded in the Coral Sea after a scuba dive on 25 January 1998. Eileen's father, John Hains, later said that he suspects the couple ultimately became dehydrated and disoriented and in the end succumbed to drowning or sharks.	
24 March 1998	Amy Lynn Bradley	23	Curaçao, Antilles	Bradley, an American passenger on the Royal Caribbean International cruise ship Rhapsody of the Seas, disappeared while the ship was docking in Curaçao.	
3 September 1999	Yves Godard	43	Channel coast, France	French physician Yves Godard along with his children Camille and Marius were last seen buying waffles from a street vendor in Bréhec, a small port on the western tip of Brittany. Their rented sailboat was found abandoned in Plouézec the next day. On 7–8 September, blood identified as that of Dr Godard's wife Marie-France was found in their camper van and in the family home. Fragments of the bodies of the three were recovered from the sea bed over the next few years. Godard's wife is still considered missing and the apparent multiple murders are unsolved. The case was officially closed in 2012 with only accidental death eliminated as a possibility.	
3 September 1999	Marie-France Godard	Unknown	Channel coast, France		
3 September 1999	Camille Godard	6	Channel coast, France		
3 September 1999	Marius Godard	4	Channel coast, France		
12 June 1999	Gerry Clark	72	Antipodes Islands, New Zealand	New Zealand sailor, writer and ornithologist Clark and his friend Roger Sale were sailing to recover satellite transmitters used to track albatrosses. Both of them disappeared while on the trip, and have never been located.	
30 November 2000	Scott Smith	45	near San Francisco, California, U.S.	Smith, a Canadian musician and bassist for the rock band Loverboy, was sailing his boat, the Sea Major, along with two friends. A large wave then swept him overboard, with subsequent searches failing to find his body.	
7 July 2002	Bison Dele	33	Tahiti, French Polynesia	Dele, an American professional basketball player, is believed to have been murdered by his brother in the sea near Tahiti, French Polynesia in 2002.	
c. 29 November 2004	Erhart Aten	72	Chuuk State	A Micronesian politician who served as the first elected Governor of Chuuk State (then called Truk). Aten and three other men were lost at sea while crossing Chuuk lagoon to Weno island when their boat was hit by a sudden storm.	
5 July 2005	George Allen Smith IV	26	Coast of Turkey	Smith, an American passenger on Brilliance of the Seas, disappeared from the ship and police suspect homicide.	
28 January 2007	Jim Gray	63	San Francisco Bay, California, U.S.	Gray, a database pioneer, Microsoft Research scientist and Turing Award winner, left San Francisco Bay in his 12 m (39 ft) sailboat Tenacious to scatter his mother's ashes at the Farallon Islands, a wildlife refuge 43 km (27 mi) away. He was reported missing when he failed to return later the same day. No Mayday call was heard and his EPIRB was not activated. Despite an ambitious search-and-rescue mission, no trace of Gray or his yacht was ever found. In 2012, he was declared legally dead.	
20 April 2007	Derek Batten	56	Shute Harbour, Australia	Kaz II, a 9.8 m (32 ft) catamaran, was found adrift on 20 April 2007 near Australia's Great Barrier Reef with its three-man crew, owner Derek Batten and brothers Peter and James Tunstead, missing. The yacht's sails were up and its engine was running. The global positioning system showed the yacht had been drifting since around the time of their last-known radio contact, about 11 hours after they departed Shute Harbour for Townsville, Queensland, five days earlier.	
20 April 2007	Peter Tunstead	69	Shute Harbour, Australia	Kaz II, a 9.8 m (32 ft) catamaran, was found adrift on 20 April 2007 near Australia's Great Barrier Reef with its three-man crew, owner Derek Batten and brothers Peter and James Tunstead, missing. The yacht's sails were up and its engine was running. The global positioning system showed the yacht had been drifting since around the time of their last-known radio contact, about 11 hours after they departed Shute Harbour for Townsville, Queensland, five days earlier.	
20 April 2007	James Tunstead	63	Shute Harbour, Australia	Kaz II, a 9.8 m (32 ft) catamaran, was found adrift on 20 April 2007 near Australia's Great Barrier Reef with its three-man crew, owner Derek Batten and brothers Peter and James Tunstead, missing. The yacht's sails were up and its engine was running. The global positioning system showed the yacht had been drifting since around the time of their last-known radio contact, about 11 hours after they departed Shute Harbour for Townsville, Queensland, five days earlier.	
9 November 2008	Tai Ching 21 fishing boat crew	Various	Kiribati	The burnt and abandoned wreck of the Tai Ching 21, a Taiwanese fishing boat, was found drifting on 9 November 2008 near Kiribati. It was assumed that when the fire proved beyond their ability to control, the 29-member crew evacuated using the lifeboat and three rafts that were missing. However, no distress call was received and an extensive search of the surrounding seas did not locate any of the crew or the lifeboats.	
1 January 2009	Jure Šterk	72	Indian Ocean	In December 2007, Slovenian sailor Šterk left Tauranga in New Zealand to sail solo around the world on his yacht Lunatic. His last radio message was heard on 1 January 2009. Lunatic was spotted on 26 January, approximately 1,000 nmi (1,900 km) off the coast of Australia. The boat was damaged and there was no sign of Šterk. Three months later, on 30 April 2009, Lunatic was found adrift by the crew of the science vessel RV Roger Revelle, 500 mi (800 km) south-eastern on position: 32°18′0″S 91°07′0″E. After boarding, it was found that the last log entry was made on 2 January 2009.	
1 March 2009	Marquis Cooper	26	Off the coast of Clearwater, Florida, U.S.	Cooper, an American football linebacker, Smith, a defensive end, and Bleakley presumably died in a boating accident, in which only one man, Nick Schuyler, survived.	
1 March 2009	Corey Smith	29	Off the coast of Clearwater, Florida, U.S.	Cooper, an American football linebacker, Smith, a defensive end, and Bleakley presumably died in a boating accident, in which only one man, Nick Schuyler, survived.	
1 March 2009	William Bleakley	25	Off the coast of Clearwater, Florida, U.S.	Cooper, an American football linebacker, Smith, a defensive end, and Bleakley presumably died in a boating accident, in which only one man, Nick Schuyler, survived.	
9 November 2009	Hubert Marcoux	68	North Atlantic Ocean	Sailing solo on his boat the Mon Pays, Marcoux left the Eastern Passage on 9 November 2009 to voyage from Nova Scotia to Bermuda. When he did not arrive, a search was conducted by Canadian and U.S. aircraft. Members of the Air National Guard later joined the search. Three days were spent scouring the ocean between Virginia and Bermuda. Officials said that he likely encountered a series of storms with wind gusts of more than 110 km/h (68 mph) and waves measuring 10 m (33 ft) in height during his trip.	
22 March 2011	Rebecca Coriam	24	Pacific Ocean near coast of Mexico	Coriam, an English crew member aboard the cruise ship Disney Wonder, was last seen when a security camera in the crew lounge recorded her having an upsetting telephone conversation. Some reports suggest she went overboard, but there is other evidence that she may have still been alive the following May.	
20 June 2012	Guma Aguiar	35	Fort Lauderdale, Florida, U.S.	Aguiar, a Brazilian-born American industrialist and investor in the Beitar Jerusalem Football Club, was reported missing on 20 June 2012 after his unoccupied fishing boat was found on the coast of Fort Lauderdale. He was declared legally dead on 29 January 2015.	
7 April 2013	Jerry Krause	Unknown	Off the coast of West Africa	Krause, an American Christian missionary and pilot mostly known for his work with the Sahel Aviation Service in Mali, disappeared on 7 April 2013 when his plane was reported missing off the coast in West Africa while en route to São Tomé International Airport. Since no wreckage has been found, authorities believe he might have been kidnapped.	
4 June 2013	Evi Nemeth	73	Tasman Sea	Nemeth, an American computer engineer often described as the matriarch of system administration, disappeared along with several others aboard the schooner Niña that was between New Zealand and Australia on 4 June 2013. No trace of them has ever been found.	
c. 1 December 2014	Dick Conant	63	Outer Banks	Conant was an American boater who disappeared near the Outer Banks sometime c. 1 December 2014 while on an eight-month trip from Plattsburgh, New York to south Florida.	
2 August 2015	Natalia Molchanova	53	Formentera, Spain	Molchanova, a Russian champion free diver and multiple record holder, disappeared during a private diving lesson, likely swept away by water currents. Despite efforts from a search party, her body has never been located and she was declared dead in absentia.	
9 September 2018	Daniel Küblböck	33	Labrador Sea	The German pop singer apparently jumped off the cruise ship AIDAluna into the sea and disappeared during a cruise from Hamburg to New York on 9 September 2018. Despite an intense search, he was not found, and the search was abandoned after eighty hours as it was deemed impossible that he could still be alive.	
2 January 2021	Yong Yu Sing No. 18 fishing boat crew	Various	Midway Island	The vessel was spotted floating near Midway Island. Upon further inspection by the United States Coast Guard, a lifeboat was missing as were all ten crew, and the ship was heavily damaged.	
8 March 2021	Sarm Heslop	41	United States Virgin Islands	Heslop disappeared from a catamaran moored off the coast of Saint John, one of the U.S. Virgin Islands, between 22:00 on 7 March 2021 and 02:30 on 8 March. Searches for her have proved fruitless. If she did go into the water, then she was only a maximum of 200 m (660 ft) from the shore.	
6 March 2025	Sudiksha Konanki	20	Dominican Republic	Konanki was a 20-year-old Indian citizen with permanent residency in the U.S. She was a pre-medical student at University of Pittsburgh who went missing on March 6, 2025. On spring break with a few of her friends at Hotel Riu Republica in Punta Cana, she was reported to have last been seen with an American on the beach.	

== Solved cases ==
Below is a list of people who were found, dead or alive, or their fate became known, after disappearing mysteriously at sea.

=== 15th century – 1969 ===
Date	Person(s)	Age	Missing from	Circumstances	Ref.
September 1475	Henry Holland, 3rd Duke of Exeter	45	English Channel	Lancastrian leader during the English Wars of the Roses. Holland fell overboard for unknown reasons and drowned in the English Channel while returning to Britain, having served within Edward IV's 1475 expedition to France. He was later found floating in the sea between Dover and Calais.	
1544	Hugh Willoughby	unknown	Arctic Sea	English soldier and voyager who led a fleet of three vessels in search of a north-east route towards the Far East and his boat on route to Lapland. While neither the wreckage or his body were ever recovered, Willoughby's journal was. It has been suggested that he died from carbon monoxide poisoning.	
1695	Ouzel Galley	Various	Uncertain, possibly Smyrna	The Ouzel was last seen in the autumn of 1695 leaving dock in Dublin under the command of Capt Eoghan Massey of Waterford. She reappeared – supposedly the triumphant victim of high seas piracy – in 1700. According to her captain, he and his crew had been commanded and forced to loot several locations including North Africa over the span of several years before overpowering their captors, retaking their vessel, and returning home unharmed.	
1897	Barney Barnato	46	At sea, near the island of Madeira	Barnato was a British entrepreneur and Randlord who disappeared at sea after mysteriously falling overboard, and was later found dead on 14 June 1897 at sea near Madeira, Portugal.	
29 September 1913	Rudolf Diesel	55	English Channel	The German inventor of the diesel engine disappeared from the steamer SS Dresden on the way from Antwerp to London. He retired to his cabin at about 10 p.m. and was never seen alive again. Ten days later, a corpse was found in the North Sea near Norway, but only personal items could be retrieved. On 13 October, these items were identified by Rudolf's son Eugen as belonging to his father.	
1916	Michael Joseph McNally	56	Chesapeake Bay, U.S.	Michael Joseph McNally, a United States Marine Sergeant, disappeared between 1 and 2 November 1916, while he was aboard a Baltimore Steam Packet Company steamer, and roughly three weeks later he was found dead.	
1918	Peter Tessem	unknown	Cape Chelyuskin	Tessem was a Norwegian carpenter who, together with a seaman named Paul Knutsen, disappeared in Cape Chelyuskin after an expedition to the Arctic. Four years later, a mummified corpse with a golden watch engraved with Tessem's name was found, indicating that it was his remains. Knutsen's body was never found.	
15 November 1924	Artur de Sacadura Freire Cabral	43	Northern Sea	Portuguese aviator who, together with Gago Coutinho, conducted the first aerial crossing of the South Atlantic in 1922. Two years later, Cabral and his co-pilot would disappear while flying over the English channel, with only partial remains of their plane's wreckage recovered later on.	
4 July 1928	Alfred Loewenstein	51	North Sea	Loewenstein was a Belgian financier who fell out of his private plane while travelling from Croydon to Brussels. His body was found 15 days later near Boulogne, France.	
November 1941	Thomas Welsby Clark	21	Christmas Island	Clark was a Royal Australian Navy sailor aboard HMAS Sydney who died during a battle with the German cruiser Kormoran. His body washed ashore on 6 February 1942, but remained unidentified until 19 November 2021.	
8 December 1941	Robert Tills	23	Malalang Bay, Philippines	Tills was a USN officer and pilot who became the first American naval officer killed during the Battle of the Philippines. His body was lost at sea, but was recovered in November 2007 and positively identified in December 2008.	
27 May 1943	Louis Zamperini	26	Oahu, Hawaii, U.S.	Zamperini was an Olympic distance runner and soldier serving on the B-24 bomber Green Hornet. Due to mechanical difficulties, the bomber crashed into the sea, killing most of the crew aside from Zamperini and two others. The trio drifted across the sea for 47 days, during which one man died, before Zamperini and his companion were captured by the Imperial Japanese Navy off the coast of the Marshall Islands. Zamperini was then held in POW camps until the end of the war.	
22 April 1943	Edward Blake Thompson	25	North Atlantic Ocean	Thompson was a member of the Ontario Rugby Football Union and served within the Royal Canadian Air Force in World War II. He was one of eighty-six individuals lost at sea when the ship upon which he was traveling, the SS Amerika, was torpedoed by the German Submarine U-306 south of Cape Farewell, Greenland.	
13 June 1943	Nathan Bedford Forrest III	38	Kiel, Nazi Germany	Forrest was Brigadier general of the USAAF who crashlanded in Germany during a bombing raid. His body was found washed up on Ruegen Island several months after he was reported missing.	
October 1947	Gay Gibson	21	Atlantic Ocean	Gibson was a young British actress who disappeared while she was on a trip aboard the MV Durban Castle between England and South Africa on 18 October 1947. It was later discovered that she was murdered and disposed of at sea.	
1 October 1950	Robert W. Langwell	unknown	Near Chuksan-ri, South Korea	Langwell was a USN seaman who was declared missing in action after falling overboard after the ship he was ensigned to, the minesweeper USS Magpie, struck a mine and sank. Langwell's body washed ashore and was buried by villagers, with his remains returned to the United States in 2008.	
27 August 1963	Jenny Cheok	21	Sisters' Islands, Singapore	Cheok, a bar waitress, was murdered by her boyfriend, Grand Prix driver and law student Sunny Ang, during a boat trip to Sisters' Island. While Cheok's body has never been found, Ang was tried, convicted and ultimately hanged for the murder.	

=== 1970–2009 ===
Date	Person(s)	Age	Missing from	Circumstances	Ref.
4 June 1989	Rose-Noëlle crew	various	Pacific Ocean	The trimaran, which was occupied by four New Zealand nationals, capsized off the coast of New Zealand and leaving the men drifting on the wreckage for 119 days before they managed to reach land.	
30 June 2005	Patrick McDermott	48	Off the coast of Los Angeles, California, U.S.	McDermott was the boyfriend of singer Olivia Newton-John; he disappeared after going on an overnight fishing trip. The United States Coast Guard concluded he was likely lost at sea. He was the subject of unsubstantiated claims to have faked his own death.	
20 April 2008	Adelir Antônio de Carli	41	Off the coast of Brazil	Adelir Antônio de Carli (February 8, 1967 – April 20, 2008), also known in Brazil as Padre Baloeiro or Padre do Balão ("Balloon Priest" in Portuguese), was a Brazilian Catholic priest, who died during an attempt at cluster ballooning on April 20, 2008. On July 4, 2008, remains later identified as Carli's were found in the ocean 100 km (62 mi) from Macaé.	
September 2008	CIA operatives	various	South China Sea	Four Central Intelligence Agency (CIA) operatives during a covert mission in the South China Sea off the coast of the Philippines	
4 January 2009	Sonny Fai	20	Te Henga / Bethells Beach, New Zealand	Professional rugby player for the New Zealand Warriors who disappeared while trying to save his brother and four cousins from a rip current. While his body was never found, he was declared drowned a few months later.	
26 January 2009	Bob Chappell	65	Hobart, Tasmania, Australia	Chappell was a radiation oncology medical physicist who was killed by his partner aboard a yacht named Four Winds. Though Chappell's body has never been found, his partner, Susan Neill-Fraser, was convicted of the crime.	
28 February 2009	Marquis Cooper, Corey Smith, and William Bleakley	Various	Off the coast of Clearwater, Florida, U.S.	Boating accident where all three eventually succumbed to hypothermia and their bodies were later lost at sea. Sole survivor Nick Schuyler co-wrote a book about the experience in 2010, titled Not Without Hope.	

=== 2010–present ===
Date	Person(s)	Age	Missing from	Circumstances	Ref.
29 September 2010	Richard Abruzzo	47	Adriatic Sea	American balloonist champion who, together with colleague Carol Rymer Davis, disappeared due to a thunderstorm while competing for the Gordon Bennett Cup. Their bodies were found three months later off the Italian coast, on 6 December 2010.	
29 September 2010	Carol Rymer Davis	65	Adriatic Sea	American balloonist champion who, together with colleague Carol Rymer Davis, disappeared due to a thunderstorm while competing for the Gordon Bennett Cup. Their bodies were found three months later off the Italian coast, on 6 December 2010.	
17 November 2012	José Salvador Alvarenga	37	Costa Azul, Mexico	Salvadoran fisherman who got lost at sea in the Pacific Ocean. He remained adrift until 30 January 2014, when he was finally found washed ashore at the Marshall Islands' Ebon Atoll, and returned to his home country.	
8 March 2014	Malaysia Airlines Flight 370 occupants	various: 1–76	South China Sea	A commercial Boeing 777-200ER airliner which disappeared above the South China Sea on 8 March 2014, carrying 239 passengers and crew. The precise cause of the loss of the aircraft is undetermined, and only eighteen pieces of debris conclusively determined as belonging to the aircraft have ever been recovered. It is now believed to be located in the southern Indian Ocean.	
15 November 2017	ARA San Juan crew	various	South Atlantic	The ARA San Juan was an Argentine submarine which mysteriously vanished while performing a training exercise. Despite search efforts, assisted by several nations, the fate of the submarine and its crew remained unknown until a year later, when marine robotics company Ocean Infinity discovered the sunken wreck.	
21 January 2022	Jean-Jacques Savin	75	Azores	Savin was an adventurer who embarked on a three-month journey from Sagres, Portugal to Martinique on 1 January 2022. On 21 January, Savin issued two distress calls, with last contact at 00:34 that morning. His boat was discovered overturned later that day. Despite being reported as having been found dead in the boat's cabin, it was later clarified he had not been recovered.	

== See also ==
- Alexander Selkirk
- Cast Away
- Lists of people who disappeared
- Philip Ashton
- Robinson Crusoe

== Sources ==
- Bulley, Anne (2000). The Bombay Country Ships, 1790–1833. Routledge. ISBN 978-0-7007-1236-6.
- Grocott, Terence (1997). Shipwrecks of the revolutionary and Napoleonic eras. Chatham. ISBN 1-86176-030-2.
- Hepper, David J. (1994). British Warship Losses in the Age of Sail, 1650–1859. Rotherfield: Jean Boudriot. ISBN 0-948864-30-3. OCLC 622348295.
- House of Commons, Parliament, Great Britain (1830). Reports from the Select Committee of the House of Commons appointed to enquire into the present state of the affairs of the East India Company, together with the minutes of evidence, an appendix of documents, and a general index. Vol. 2. Printed by order of the honourable court of directors, by J.L. Cox.
- Low, Charles Rathbone (1877). History of the Indian Navy: (1613-1863). R. Bentley and son.
- Winfield, Rif (2007). British Warships in the Age of Sail 1714–1792: Design, Construction, Careers and Fates. Seaforth. ISBN 978-1-84415-700-6.
