= Albert Johan Petersson =

Swedish chemist, engineer and industrialist

- Born: 8 February 1870
- Died: c. 19 August 1914 (aged 44); Possibly Bergen
- Occupations: Chemist, engineer and industrialist
- Known for: Unsolved disappearance

Albert Johan Petersson (6 February 1870 – 18/19 August 1914) was a Swedish chemist, engineer and industrialist. He is most known as the developer of the Alby-furnace for producing of Calcium carbide, and as the first director of the carbide and cyanamide factories in Odda in Norway. He was born in Landskrona, Sweden and probably died during a boat trip between Odda and Bergen.

== Family and disappearance ==
Albert Petersson was married to the German born Leonie Witt, daughter of professor Otto Nikolaus Witt (1853–1915) in Berlin. Together they had two children, both born in Odda. Claus was born in 1907. Then Ingrid in 1910, in which Leonie died from childbirth complications. On 18 August 1914 Petersson went aboard the fjord steamer D/S Ullensvang in Odda. The next morning the boat arrived in Bergen and he had disappeared. The cause of his disappearance remains unknown.

== See also ==
- List of people who disappeared mysteriously at sea

== Literature ==
- Asbjørn Andersen og Ivar Haug (red.) Smeltedigelen – en industrisaga Odda Smelteverk gjennom 80 år, Odda 1989
- Jan Gravdal, Svensken som fant Odda, Haugesunds Avis, 24. April 1999
- Jan Gravdal and Vidar Våde, Tyssefaldene – krafttak i 100 år 1906-2006, Tyssedal 2006
- Adm dir. Egil Kollenborg, Aktieselskabet Tyssefaldene 1906-1956, Stavanger 1956

== Sources ==
- Biography in Nordisk familjebok (1915)
- Elisabeth Bjørsvik, Cyanamidproduksjon i Odda 1908-1935
- NVIM: Eit liv med karbid
