= Jean-Jacques Savin =

French adventurer

- Born: 14 January 1947; France
- Disappeared: 21 January 2022 (aged 75); Atlantic Ocean
- Occupation: Adventurer
- Known for: Making solo trips across the Atlantic Ocean

Jean-Jacques Savin (French: [ʒɑ̃ ʒak savɛ̃]; 14 January 1947 – disappeared 21 January 2022) was a French adventurer. He also worked as a paratrooper, a private pilot, and as a curator of a state park in the Central African Republic. In 2018–2019, he crossed the Atlantic Ocean by floating alone in a barrel-shaped capsule for over four months. He disappeared during an attempt to row alone across the Atlantic in January 2022.

== 2018–2019 Atlantic voyage ==
In late December 2018, Savin boarded a barrel-shaped capsule and began his voyage from El Hierro in the Canary Islands. The solar-powered capsule was designed to withstand orca attacks and waves, and included a kitchen and sleeping bunk. He arrived in the Caribbean more than four months later, on 27 April 2019, whereupon he declared his voyage a success. After a Dutch oil tanker picked him and his barrel up and ferried them to Sint Eustatius, where Savin stayed a few days, a French tugboat took him to Martinique.

== 2022 Atlantic voyage ==
On 1 January 2022, Savin set off from Sagres, Portugal, in a rowing boat 8 m (26 ft) long and 1.7 m (5 ft 7 in) wide, with 300 kg (660 lb) of equipment, including a spear gun, a heater, two desalinators, freeze-dried food, and his mandolin. He was to arrive to the French Caribbean island of Martinique three months later. In the early hours of 21 January, Savin sent two distress beacons to indicate he was encountering great difficulty, with official last contact at 00:34. His boat was found overturned later that day by the Portuguese coast guard, and the next day, a diver commissioned to investigate reportedly discovered Savin's body in the cabin. However, it was later reported Savin had not been discovered in his cabin, and that he had been lost at sea.

== See also ==
- List of people who disappeared mysteriously at sea
