= Gerry Atwell =

Australian RAAF pilot and rugby league footballer

Personal information
- Full name: Gerald Joseph Atwell
- Born: 16 January 1917; Campsie, New South Wales, Australia
- Died: 20 April 1944 (aged 27); Adriatic Sea

Playing information
- Height: 5 ft 9 in (175 cm)
- Weight: 163 lb (74 kg)
Club
Years	Team	Pld	T	G	FG	P
1940	North Sydney	2	0	0	0	0

Gerald Joseph Atwell (16 January 1917 – 20 April 1944) was an Australian RAAF pilot whose plane failed to return from a bombing raid over Italy in WWII. He had been a top-grade rugby league footballer who played in the New South Wales Rugby League for North Sydney.

== Early life and rugby career ==
Atwell was born on 16 January 1917 in Campsie to Henry and Mary Atwell. He appeared twice for North Sydney in 1940. He worked as a hairdresser.

== Personal life and military career ==
Atwell enlisted in the Royal Australian Air Force on 24 May 1941 in Sydney during WWII. He trained as a pilot and was assigned as such on 30 May 1942, sailing to England in August of that year. Pilot Officer Atwell was attached to No. 614 Squadron RAF in early 1944, flying Handley Page Halifax bombers from Celone Airfield. On 20 April, Atwell took off in Halifax JF108 to conduct a bombing mission against marshalling yards at Mestre. The aircraft assigned to the mission were recalled after the weather deteriorated, but JF108 did not arrive back at base and was considered lost. The bodies of three crew members were recovered; however, Atwell and the other crewmen have never been found. He is commemorated on the Malta Memorial.

== Career statistics ==
Appearances and goals by club, season and competition
Club	Season	Division	League				Other				Total			
Club	Season	Division	Apps	Tries	Goals	Points	Apps	Tries	Goals	Points	Apps	Tries	Goals	Points
North Sydney	1940	New South Wales Rugby League	2	0	0	0	0	0	0	0	2	0	0	0
Career total			2	0	0	0	0	0	0	0	2	0	0	0

== See also ==
- List of people who disappeared mysteriously at sea
