= Bellona (1799 ship) =

Whaler Ship that Disappeared in 1809

History

Kingdom of Great Britain
- Name: Bellona
- Namesake: Bellona
- Owner: Fishburn and Broderick
- Builder: Fishburn and Broderick, Whitby
- Launched: 1799
- Fate: Missing 1809

General characteristics
- Tons burthen: 241, or 243 (bm)
- Complement: 1799:20; 1803:30
- Armament: 1799:16 × 6–pounder + 4 × 18-pounder cannons; 1803:16 × 9&18-pounder cannons

Bellona was launched at Lancaster in 1799. She was a West Indiaman that made one voyage as a whaler. She disappeared in 1809, as she was returning to England from Jamaica.

== Career ==
Bellona first appeared in Lloyd's Register (LR) in 1799, with W.Croft, master, Stuart, owner, and trade Lancaster–Barbados. Captain William Croft acquired a letter of marque on 14 December 1799.

The Register of Shipping for 1804, showed Bellona with Munro, master, Hill, owner, and trade London–Southern Fishery.

Captain Mark Monro received a letter of marque on 7 July 1803. Captain Mark Monro (or Munro, or Monroe), sailed from England on 20 July 1803, bound for the Isle of Desolation. Bellona engaged in whaling and seal hunting in 1803–1804, and was reported to have been "all well" in February 1804. Bellona returned on 10 July 1804. (Note: Of 812 vessels in the British Southern Whale Fishery Database, 385 (42%), made only one voyage. Williams, Smith, master, had discovered the South Shetland Islands in 1819. The British Government published information on the islands in 1821; a rush of sealers to the islands followed.)

The Register of Shipping for 1806, showed Bellona's master changing from M. Munro to J. Thompson, her owner from J. Hill to "Captain", and her trade from Southern Fishery to London–Jamaica. Later issues of LR and RS gave the name of her owner as Auldjo.

== Loss ==
Bellona, Thompson, master, was one of three ships that had left Jamaica on 27 July 1809, in a convoy and that were last heard from on 27 August 1809. When the convoy, under the escort of HMS Favorite, encountered a hurricane, the three ships had separated from the convoy. (Note: The other two were Ann, James, master, and Mary, James, master.)

== See also ==
- List of people who disappeared mysteriously at sea
