= HCS Intrepid (1780) =

History

Great Britain
- Name: HCS Intrepid
- Owner: British East India Company
- Builder: Bombay Dockyard
- Launched: 1780
- Fate: Foundered without a trace circa 1802

General characteristics
- Tons burthen: (bm)
- Complement: 40 Europeans and about 40 sepoys and lascars (1800)
- Armament: 1780: 16 guns; 1800:10 × 6-pounder guns

HCS Intrepid was a snow of the Bombay Marine launched in 1780 by the Bombay Dockyard. She participated in the seizure of Malacca on 17 August 1795 and in an inconclusive single-ship action with a French privateer off Muscat on 22 November 1800. She foundered without a trace in late 1800 or early 1801.

== Career ==
The Dutch government at Malacca arranged with the British government to turn Malacca over to the British rather than the having the Batavian Government, allies of the French, take possession. The British sent an expedition from Bengal that arrived off Malacca on 15 August 1795. HMS Resistance arrived on the 17th, and the operation began that morning. Intrepid was one of the British vessels that participated.

On 10 June 1797 Intrepid captured the Dutch settlement of Kupang, Timor, in cooperation with Resistance. Lieutenant Frost of Intrepid was sent ashore to become acting-governor of the settlement, but the native population rose up against him and he narrowly escaped, with sixteen sepoys and seamen being killed. Resistance then bombarded Kupang into submission and sent a strong landing party ashore, destroying much of the town before abandoning it.

On 22 November 1800 Intrepid, under the command of Captain George Hall, was returning to India from Bussorah and was off Muscat when she encountered a French privateer of twelve 6 and 9-pounder carronades. An engagement started at 9:30 am. The privateer, which had a larger complement than Intrepid, twice tried to board Intrepid, but Hall so maneuvered her as to frustrate the attempts. At about 10:45 a.m. Hall sustained a mortal wound and was taken below decks. The First Lieutenant, Thomas Smee, continued the engagement until at about 11:45am the privateer sailed away. The British repaired Intrepid's sails and rigging, and then gave chase, but were unable to catch the privateer. Hall died on the 30th. In all the British lost six men killed, including Hall, and 22 men wounded, including her two lieutenants, Smee and Best. Intrepid arrived back at Bombay on 10 December.

== Fate ==
Later in October 1800 Earl Talbot struck on the Perates, in the South China Sea some 300 miles to the southeast of Hong Kong, during a gale. She foundered with the loss of all her passengers and crew, who numbered some 150 persons. Houghton was sailing from China to Bombay when she sighted the wreckage. Houghton reported the loss at Bombay.

The EIC sent two vessels, Intrepid, Captain George Roper, and HCS Comet, Lieutenant William Henry, from Bombay to the Paracel Islands to search for the cause of Earl Talbot's loss and to pick up any possible survivors. In February 1802 reports had reached London that although the two vessels had made many discoveries relating to natural history and geography, and had seen wreckage of other vessels on uninhabited islands, they had found nothing further concerning Earl Talbot.

The two vessels were still listed on the establishment of the Bombay Marine as of 1 January 1802. However, by 1803, there was a recognition that both Intrepid and Comet had disappeared without a trace. They were presumed to have foundered at sea.

== See also ==
- List of people who disappeared mysteriously at sea
