= Disappearance of Sarm Heslop =

2021 disappearance in the U.S. Virgin Islands

Sarm Heslop
- Born: 19 December 1979 (age 46)
- Disappeared: 8 March 2021 (aged 41); Saint John, US Virgin Islands
- Status: Missing for 5 years, 5 months and 12 days
- Height: 5 ft 7 in (170 cm)
- Website: Find Sarm Heslop

Sarm Joan Lillian Heslop (born 19 December 1979) is a British woman who went missing from a catamaran, moored in a bay off the western coast of Saint John, one of the United States Virgin Islands, in March 2021. She was last seen by a third party at a restaurant on 7 March, and was believed to have taken a dinghy with her boyfriend back to the yacht she was staying on. He reported that she was missing sometime after 02:30 local time (UTC−04:00), on the following day (8 March 2021). Since that time, there have been multiple searches; however, there has been no indication of what happened, or why she went missing.

== Disappearance ==
Heslop, originally from Southampton, and 41 at the time of her disappearance, was staying on a 47-foot (14 m) long catamaran, the Siren Song, in the U.S. Virgin Islands. Heslop was working with her boyfriend, Ryan Bane, a native of Michigan, United States, on the catamaran as a chef in the luxury yacht business; they were available for private charters. Previous to this, she had been a flight attendant for FlyBe, meeting her boyfriend sometime in 2020 on the dating app Tinder.

Heslop and her boyfriend went to the island of Saint John for dinner on 7 March 2021. The couple aboard the boat Siren Song was observed earlier in the day by another couple on an adjacent boat, and they stated that all seemed to be calm. They should have left the restaurant by 22:00 and returned to the Siren Song, as the island was under a COVID-19 curfew at that time. The catamaran was moored in Cruz Bay, some 200 feet (61 m) from the shore, which would have meant the two taking a dinghy between the shore and the catamaran. The last person to see Heslop before her disappearance was her boyfriend, who stated that she was asleep by 22:00 (on the 7 March), and gone by 02:30 (on 8 March 2021). (Note: The anchor alarm had gone off around this time, wakening Heslop's boyfriend. It was around this time he stated that he found she was not on the boat.) He took the dinghy out to the island to report her absence to the police, who advised him to call the coastguard. However, it was not until 11:45 that he called the coastguard, a gap of nine hours. The nine-hour wait between the initial police contact, and when Ryan Bane called the coastguard, has been questioned by Heslop's family and a fellow skipper of a boat moored nearby. Heslop's father said "It just drives me nuts. What happened between 02:00 and 11:45 in the morning? He didn't shout and holler – he didn't ask for nobody, he just made a phone call to the police. There's just no answers."

Despite the police being invited onto the boat, it was reported that the boat has never been searched, or its owner questioned about Heslop's disappearance. The refusal to allow authorities to search the boat was on the advice of the boyfriend's attorney; however, local police did issue citations to Bane on account of not being allowed to search the boat, for not having registration documentation, and for safety equipment violations. The citations are all civil matters and do not contribute to a criminal charge. Heslop's phone, wallet and passport, which were left behind on the catamaran, were all passed to police. Police on Saint John searched the coastline with drones, divers and sniffer dogs, but no evidence was found of Heslop. Nine days after she went missing, a local dog walker on the island of Saint John came forward to say that they heard a scream out at sea (in the rough direction of where the catamaran was anchored) around the time that Heslop was stated to have gone missing. Two weeks after her disappearance, the FBI were called in to assist with the investigation. A family friend said that Heslop was "level-headed [and a] strong swimmer," adding that she couldn't understand why Heslop would "...get out of bed to go for a swim between the hours of 10:30 and one o'clock in the morning. I know she wouldn't." Another friend said much the same about Heslop;

"She is one of the most organised people I know. This is someone who sailed across the Atlantic without incident, only to disappear 100-foot (30 m) (Note: Distances and timings vary between sources. Some state the Siren Song was moored 200-foot (61 m) from the shore, others state 50 yards (46 m), or 100-foot (30 m). Timings have been varied too, some state that Heslop's boyfriend woke "just after 02:00 (on the 8 March), others state 02:30.) from shore. The pieces in the puzzle don't add up.

The family of Heslop claimed in November 2022, that the Virgin Islands Police Department showed them CCTV footage of Bane and Heslop leaving the restaurant/bar complex. However, the police stopped the video before the footage ended, refusing to show them the rest, and also refusing to release the tape in case it was prejudicial to a future court case. Part of the complaint about this by Heslop's family was that in the footage she was not in what she had been described as wearing according to the last witness statement. It was stated that she was in a black dress with flowers upon it, but in the CCTV imagery, she was observed wearing a top with either shorts or a skirt. The black dress was also not among items returned to the family after her disappearance.

In November 2021, the boat Siren Song was put up for sale at £167,800 (US$229,000), with its name removed. Family and friends of Heslop were alerted to its sale by locals in Grenada where it was moored. They called for a full forensic search of the vessel, something which they claim has never been done.

In 2025, a BBC reporter made a documentary about Heslop's disappearance called Missing in Paradise: Searching for Sarm, featuring previously unseen video footage of Bane and Heslop walking down a small dock entering a dinghy.

== See also ==
- List of people who disappeared mysteriously at sea
