= HMS Elizabeth (1805 cutter) =

Cutter of the Royal Navy

History

United Kingdom
- Name: HMS Elizabeth
- Acquired: 1805 by capture
- Fate: Foundered c. September 1807

General characteristics
- Tons burthen: 110 (bm)
- Sail plan: Cutter (or schooner)
- Complement: 55
- Armament: 10 guns

HMS Elizabeth was a Spanish dispatch cutter named Elizabet that HMS Bacchante captured off Havana in 1805. The British Royal Navy took her into service under her existing name. She disappeared in 1807, believed foundered without a trace.

== Capture ==
On 3 April 1805, Bacchante captured the Spanish naval cutter or schooner Elizabeth of ten guns and 47 men under the command of Don Josef Fer Fexegron. Elizabeth had been carrying dispatches from the Spanish governor of Pensacola, but had thrown these overboard before her capture. (Note: Head money for Isabella, alias Elizabeth, was paid in January 1821. A first-class share was worth £76 18s 5¼d; a fifth-class share, that of a seaman, was worth 7s 1¼d.)

== HMS, and loss ==
The Royal Navy commissioned Elizabeth in 1806 under Lieutenant John Sedley. She disappeared c. September 1807 without a trace, presumed to have foundered with all hands.

== See also ==
- List of people who disappeared mysteriously at sea
