= Kaz II =

Ghost ship found off north-coast of Australia

Locations
1 Airlie Beach - departure port.
2 Ship found without crew.

Kaz II, dubbed "the ghost yacht", is a 9.8-metre catamaran which was found drifting 88 nautical miles (163 kilometres) off the north-eastern coast of Australia on 20 April 2007. The fate of its three-man crew remains unknown, and the mysterious circumstances in which they disappeared have been compared to that of Mary Celeste in 1872.

== Crew ==
Kaz II had a three-man crew, all of whom were residents of Perth, Western Australia: Derek Batten (56), Peter Tunstead (69) and James Tunstead (63). The three men were relatively inexperienced sailors, but the skipper, Batten, had undertaken a sailing course and two extended trips onboard Kaz II around the Whitsunday Islands and outer reef.

== Disappearance of crew ==
According to the Australian Maritime Safety Authority, Kaz II departed from Airlie Beach on 15 April 2007, and was heading for Townsville, Queensland, on the first leg of a journey that was to take it around Northern Australia to Western Australia. The first indication that there was a problem came on 18 April, when a helicopter reported spotting Kaz II adrift in the vicinity of the Great Barrier Reef, and that her crew were potentially in distress. On 20 April, maritime authorities caught up with the boat and boarded her. They found the three-man crew missing in circumstances which they described as being "strange".

"What they found was a bit strange in that everything was normal; there was just no sign of the crew." – Jon Hall, Queensland's Emergency Management office.

In a statement delivered on the day of the boarding, the Queensland Emergency Management Office officials revealed that the boat was in serviceable condition and laid out as if the crew were still on board. Food and flatware were set out on the table, a laptop computer was set up and turned on, and the engine was still running. Officials also confirmed that the boat's emergency systems, including her radio and GPS, were fully functional, and that she still had her full complement of life jackets. There was even a small boat still hoisted on the stern of the boat, and the anchor was up. The only signs that were out of the ordinary, other than the disappearance of the crew, were that one of the boat's sails had been badly shredded, and that there was no life raft on board (it is unknown whether there ever was one aboard).

== Forensic examination ==
Kaz II undergoing forensic examination in Townsville

On Friday, 20 April, Kaz II was towed into the Townsville port for forensic examination. On 21 April, Sergeants Bardell and Molloy of the Queensland Police searched the ship for signs of foul play or third-party involvement; no evidence for this was found. They found the cabin to be neat and tidy apart from some magazines, a piece of newspaper, and a wine cask which were lying on the floor. It was later determined that these items ended up on the floor while the ship was being towed to shore. In the sink were a few butter knives and, on a bench in the galley, a plastic sheath of fishing knives was found. They did not appear to have been used recently. Under Batten's bed, in a sealed container, the investigators found a firearm and some ammunition, none of which was apparently missing. In a drawer they found an additional single bullet of the same calibre.

After analyzing data about Kaz II's course from the ship's GPS system, police say that, on the morning of its departure from Airlie Beach, the ship was steered in northeast direction into an area where squalls and rough seas were building. On that same day, late in the afternoon, the GPS data showed it to be adrift. The investigators also recovered a video recording that showed footage taken by the crew during their trip, which revealed some clues as to the men's last day. The last footage, recorded by James Tunstead on 15 April at 10:05 AM, shortly before the men disappeared, showed, among other things:

- Batten was at the helm.
- Peter Tunstead is sitting on the aft stairway of the boat; he is fishing.
- A long white rope can be seen trailing behind the boat.
- The engine is not running.
- Fenders can be seen hanging from safety rails on both sides of the boat.
- The camera is panned 360 degrees and shows islands and surroundings; this helped investigators pinpoint the exact location of the ship.
- The sea is choppy and none of the men are wearing life jackets.
- Tunstead's shirt and glasses are not in the place where they were later found.

== Search ==
Search and rescue efforts began on Wednesday, 18 April, and Australian search and rescue AusSAR sent a Navy aircraft to search in the vicinity of the vessel in an effort to locate the missing men. At the same time, Bowen Voluntary Marine Rescue launched a coastal and island search. At night, an aircraft with infrared capability was used to search the reefs and cays. The next day, a full scale search-and-rescue effort was launched involving Volunteer Rescue Units from several towns as well as the Townsville's coast guard, two rescue helicopters, nine airplanes, and two commercial vessels. Data from Kaz II's GPS system was also retrieved and analyzed in order to help narrow the search area.

Dr. Paul Luckin, a survival-time expert, was consulted. He concluded it was unlikely that the men were alive if they were still in the water as they had probably gone overboard three to four days earlier. The teams still had hope that the men could have reached land and continued searching until 4:00 P.M. on 21 April, when the air and sea search for the three crew members was called off. Another coastline search was launched on Monday 23 April after some new information had come in but the search proved fruitless and was called off on 25 April.

== Official investigation ==
On 4 August 2008, an inquest into the men's disappearance began in the Townsville Coroner's Court. The inquest was led by Queensland state coroner Michael Barnes and focused on whether the men were dead, the circumstances surrounding their disappearance, and if the search for the missing men was adequate. In total 27 witnesses were called to testify. Some of them had seen the ship on its fateful voyage and helped authorities to reconstruct the chain of events.

=== Hearings ===
In one of the hearings, Jennifer Batten testified that her husband Derek was well prepared and had previously taken Kaz II out on two trips with no problems.

Batten's wife also stated that the original plan was to sail Kaz II to Fremantle as a couple, but that Batten was worried that just two people aboard might not be safe. He decided to take his neighbours, brothers Peter and James Tunstead, with him instead. The trip was planned over several months and discussed daily as they plotted routes with the help of a computer. "They allowed themselves six to eight weeks to get back to Fremantle, but because Des and Peter were retired, it didn't really matter how long they took … They didn't want to sail at night for safety [reasons]", Jennifer Batten said, and they planned to stay reasonably close to the shore. Although Batten was taking medications for high cholesterol, mild diabetes, and had suffered a heart attack at age 50, she believed that he was well enough and fit for the journey.

Also heard was Graeme Douglas, the previous owner of Kaz II, who had sold the boat to Batten. He stated the boat was in good condition when it was sold and that he had met the men on the night before they set sail. He also helped the men plan part of their route and was surprised to see that, according to the police, the men had deviated from their planned route that was programmed in their GPS system.

Gavin Howland, the skipper of the commercial fishing vessel Jillian, testified that on 16 April 2007, while fishing on a reef off Bowen, he and his crew saw a white yacht with a torn sail drifting sideways between the reefs through a narrow passage, at up to 3 kn (5.6 km/h), in north-northeastern direction along with the current. He came within 50 metres of the boat but was unable to spot anyone on board. This was two days before the coast guard spotted Kaz II adrift off the coast of Townsville and the day after authorities believe the men went missing. Howland found it odd that a sailboat was in an area noted for its shallow water and rocks. He did not attempt to contact the boat or the authorities. Howland told the inquest that it did not occur to him that the crew of the yacht might be in distress and went on to say: "It did seem a bit strange to me but I just have this rule that no one goes near another vessel".

Sergeant Paul Molloy, one of the three forensic police officers who examined Kaz II after she was towed back to shore in April 2007, told the inquest that he did not believe the men had met with foul play. He spent several hours combing the ship for signs of a struggle, but found no evidence that anyone beside the three-man crew of the vessel had been aboard. "We came to the conclusion the boat itself was not a crime scene," he told the inquest. After questions by Peter Tunstead's widow Frances as to why the police did not check for fingerprints, Sgt. Molloy said his years of experience told him it was not necessary. "We were there for a long time; we pulled the boat apart and found nothing untoward... If there was any indication [of foul play] we would have taken every measure we could to examine that boat."

Detective Sergeant Graham Patch said that the police found a video recorder inside the boat. On it was footage taken by the three crew members on the morning they went missing. As the video was played in the courtroom, Patch explained that land masses on the video helped officials narrow the search area for the missing crewmen.

=== Conclusions ===
State coroner Barnes admits in his official report that he "cannot be so definitive about the circumstances under which the deaths occurred." However, based on the eyewitness accounts, the video found on board, and the state of the yacht in which it was found, the report proposes the following scenario:

On Sunday, 15 April 2007, at 10:05 A.M., Kaz II was sailing in the vicinity of George Point; up to that moment everything was going as planned. "In the next hour or so things changed dramatically."

The men hauled in the white rope that was trailing behind the boat and bundled it up on the foredeck, possibly to dry, next to the locker it was normally kept in. For unknown reasons, James Tunstead then took off his T-shirt and glasses and placed them on the backseat. The report says that since the men's fishing lure was found entangled in the ship's port side rudder, an obvious explanation would be that one of them tried to free the lure and fell overboard while doing so. Standing on the boat's 'sugar scoop' platform (a platform at the back of the ship close to the waterline) while the boat is moving is perilous and "falling in would be easy and getting back aboard nearly impossible." One of the other men then came to the rescue of his brother, while Batten, still on board, started the motor and realized he had to drop the sails before he could go back for his friends.

As he left the helm to drop the sails, a deviation of the ship's course or wind direction could have easily caused a jibe, swinging the boom across the deck and knocking Batten overboard. This could even have happened before Batten was able to untie and throw out the life ring to his friends. A blue coffee mug found near the life ring may support this. Since the boat was travelling before wind and at a speed of 15 kn (28 km/h), it would be out of reach of the men within seconds.

The report goes on to state: "From that point, the end would have been swift. None of them were good swimmers, the seas were choppy; the men would have quickly become exhausted and sunk beneath the waves."

The report rules out foul play and staged disappearance.

== Other explanations ==
Interior of Kaz II showing laundry hung up to dry

Several alternative explanations have been put forward for the crew's disappearance.

According to authorities in Townsville, the weather had been windy and the sea had been rough between the time that Kaz II departed and was found drifting. This led authorities to speculate that the crew may have experienced some form of sudden difficulty during rough weather and gone overboard. However, one issue with this theory is that contents of the cabin, including a table, did not seem to have been disrupted in any way. Relatives of the missing men say that the boat's condition make this unlikely and point to discrepancies such as the fact that the men's fishing lines and laundry were set out, and that their life jackets were still stowed, which indicated that they were not experiencing rough weather at the time of their disappearance.

Also noted was that Kaz II was found with its fenders out, leading to speculation that the boat may have docked with another as-yet-unknown vessel to which the crew might have willingly, or unwillingly, transferred.

"The fenders were out on their yacht, and the only reason you ever put them out is when another boat comes aside or if you come to rest against a wharf." – Hope Himing, niece of boat owner Derek Batten.

In answer to speculation, Townsville police stated that small craft commonly leave their fenders out at all times, making it impossible to draw any definitive conclusions about this feature. In addition, the Coroner's report noted that an eyewitness and video evidence highlighted the fenders had been left out when the vessel left the marina.

Batten was said to have bought Kaz II a year before and sailed it a couple of times since then. The Tunsteads were not nautical novices either, since they sailed together from the time they were 18 years old, and even worked in the radio rooms of the Volunteer Sea Rescue. The last known contact of the family members with any of the crew was made one-and-a-half hours after it left port, when one crew member was contacted by his wife.

Volunteer radio operator Ivan Ormes recorded that Kaz II radioed in at 6:45 P.M. on 15 April, the evening of their departure, giving its position as George Point. This is the last known contact with Kaz II. Ms. Grey says that it should have taken them only 2 1/2 hours to go to George Point and that it is unclear what took them so long to arrive there. One explanation is that they were just fishing the whole day. But another explanation is that they had problems with their GPS, since they already tried to set off on 14 April, but were forced to return because of the non-functional GPS. That incident was because of a user error and it was easily fixed, so Kaz II set off early the next day.

Other hypotheses include that the boat became stuck on a sandbar near George Point, where the boat's last radio message was made. When the men jumped overboard to push it free, a gust of wind blew and the boat drifted away, leaving them stranded. This would explain why towels were left out on the deck. Another hypothesis is that one crew member may have been washed over by a freak wave and that the others were lost trying to rescue him. A waterspout might also be the culprit; they can be encountered in rough seas. April is a prime month for waterspouts in that area of Australia — they occur just a bit offshore, exactly the area Kaz II was, and they have the force to rip a sail, lift and throw crew off deck, pull a life raft out activating its quick-release fittings. All this without Kaz II ever being in contact with choppy seas.

== See also ==
- List of people who disappeared mysteriously at sea
