= Giuseppe Sartorio =

Italian sculptor (1854–1922)

Giuseppe Sartorio (Boccioleto, Province of Vercelli, 1854 – Mar Tirreno, 20 September 1922) was an Italian sculptor.

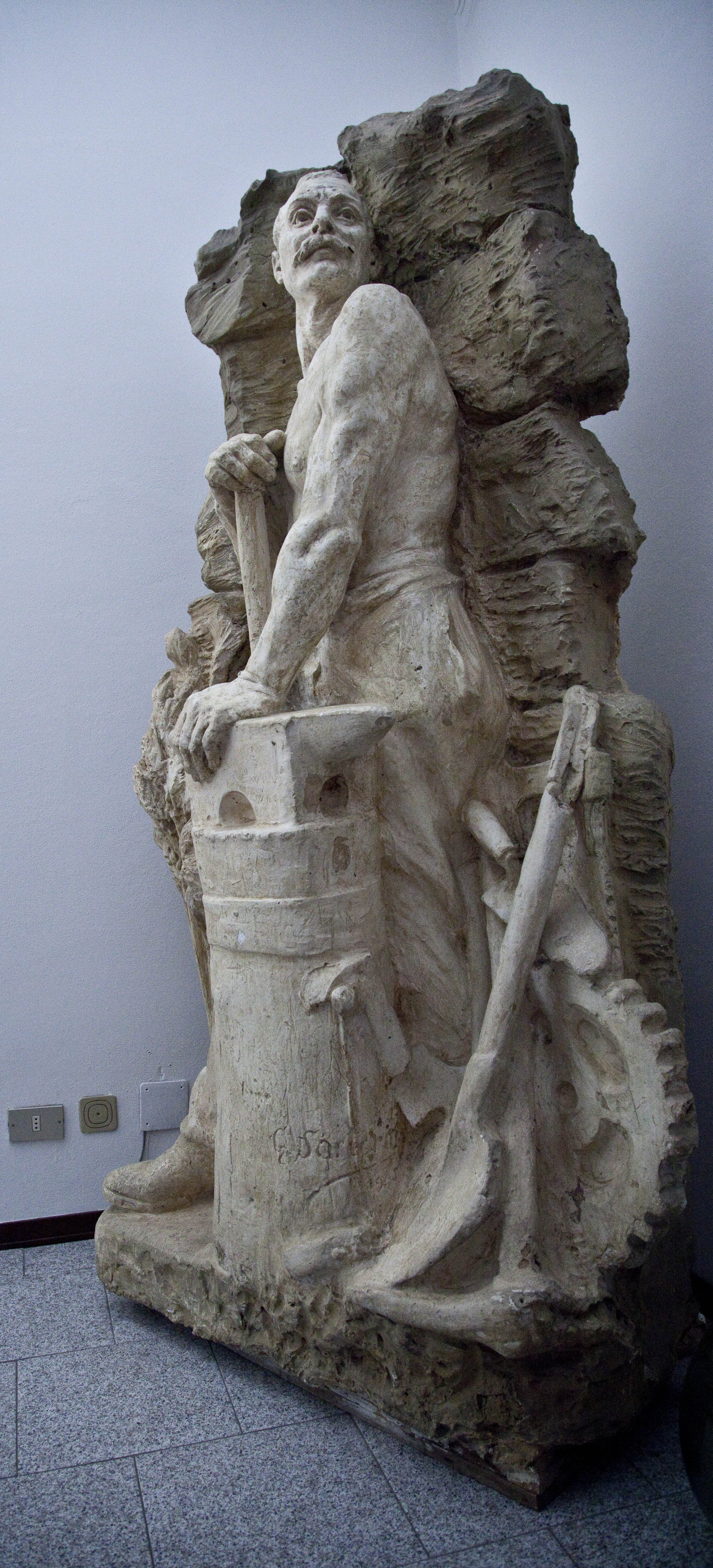
"Labor" stucco work in Cavallirio.

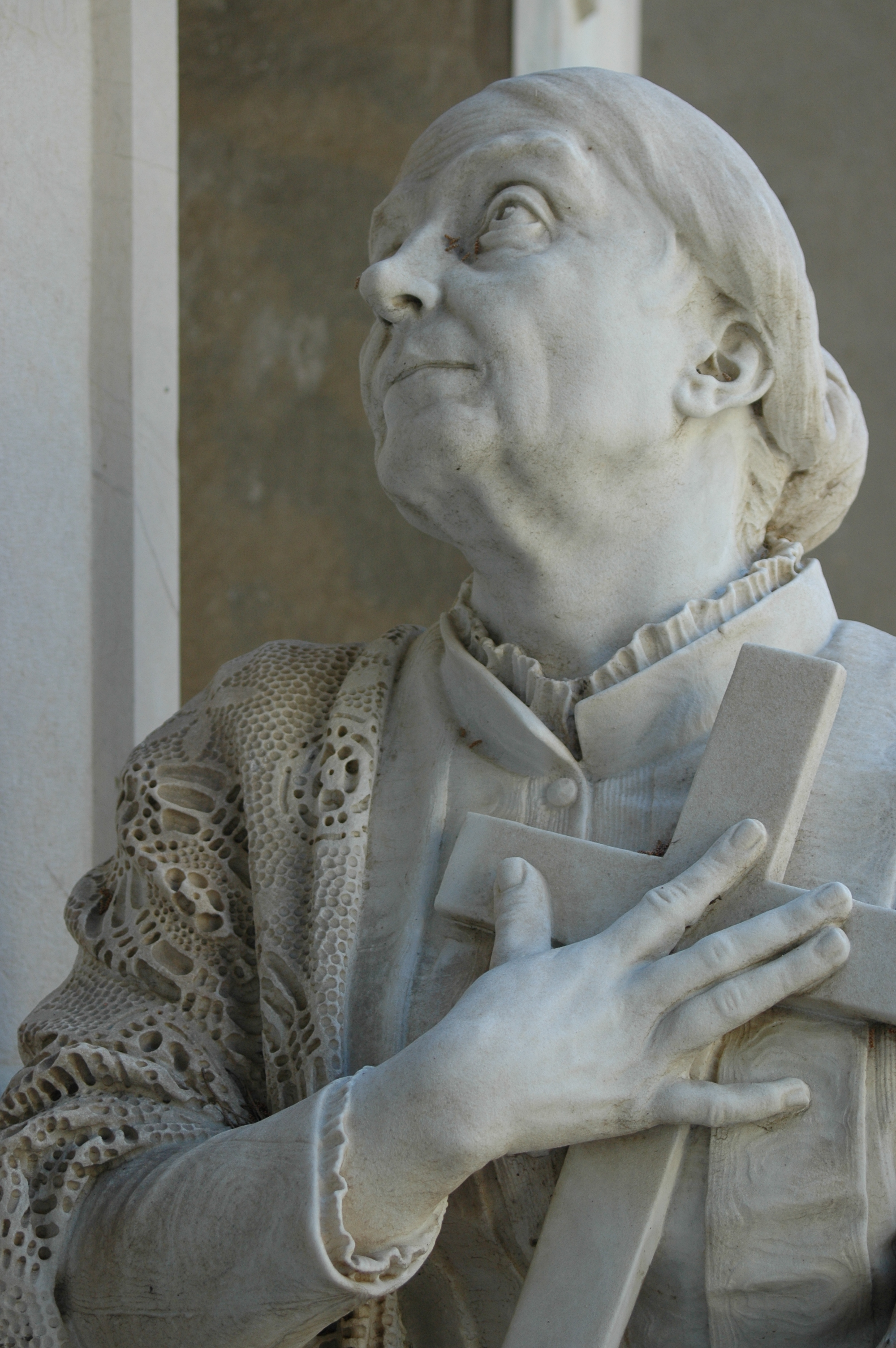
Monument to lawyer Giuseppe Todde, Cemetery of Bonaria, Cagliari.

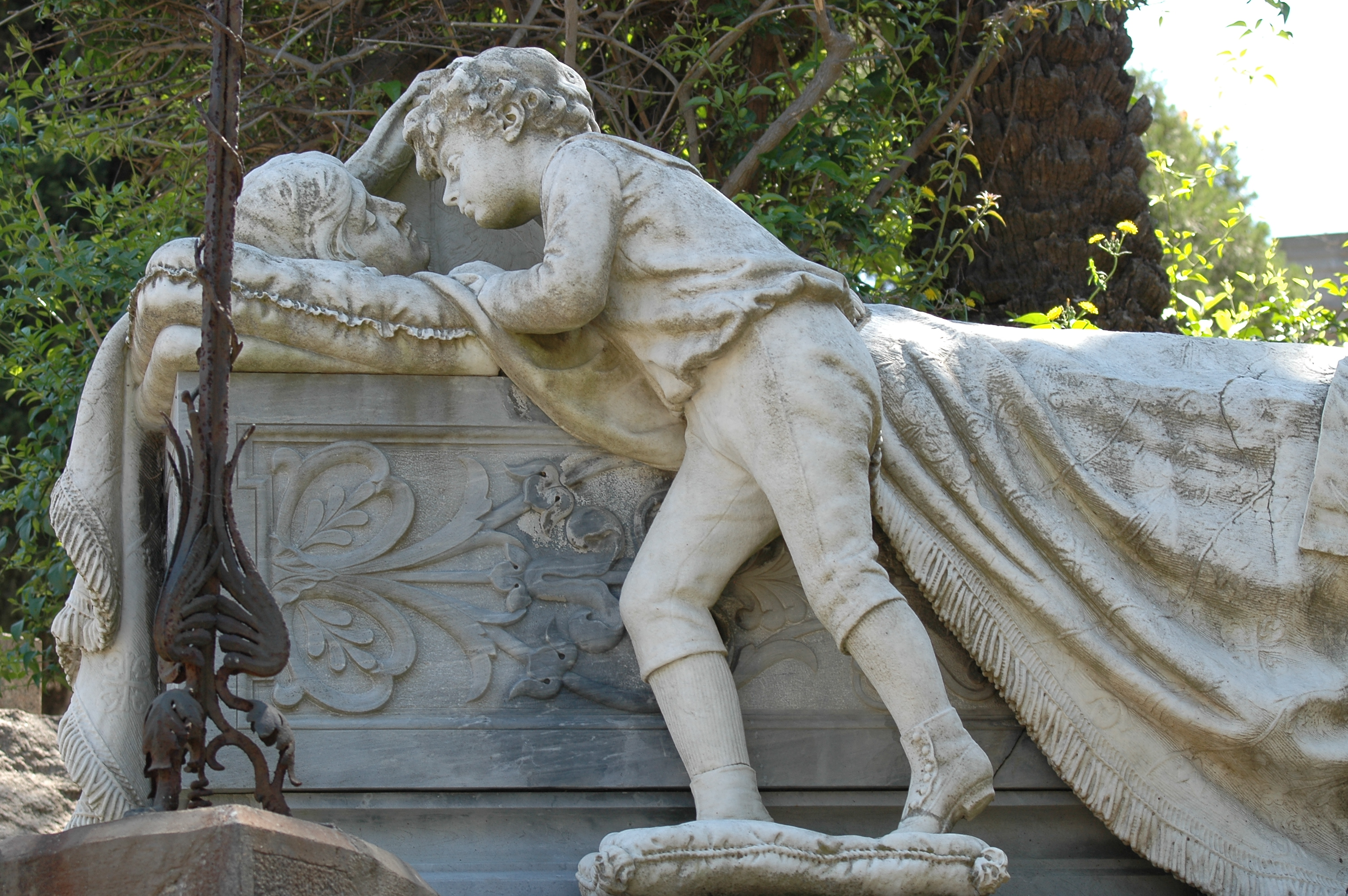
Monument a Francesca Warzee, Cemetery of Bonaria, Cagliari.

== Early life ==
He was born to a family of initially limited means, but his mother's family had enriched themselves trading in precious stones, and his father had been an able vintner. As a boy, Sartorio was apprenticed in Varallo Pombia with engraving sculptor Giuseppe Antonini. Later he continued his studies in the Albertina Academy in Turin under Odoardo Tabacchi. He won a stipend from the Collegio Caccia of Novara, and moved to Rome to attend the Academy of St. Luke, where he won many prizes, including his first, for a funerary shrine for the family Onnis-Devoto in Cemetery of Bonaria in Cagliari.

== Career ==
This work led to further work creating funerary monuments in Sardinia. He had two workshops, one in Cagliari, and a second one in Sassari. Not only makes funerary monuments but also completes: the statues of Saints Peter and Paul for the church of Cuglieri, the war memorial for Italian Independence in Cagliari, the Monument to Vittorio Emanuele II in Sassari, the statues of the three local benefactors of the parish church of Ittireddu, and others throughout Sardinia.

Sartorio lived in Turin. He completed busts in terracotta and stucco. Among these Indovina? ("Guess?") in 1881 at Milan. In 1884 at the Exhibition of Fine Arts in Turin, he displayed a marble group portrait, commissioned by signora Rosa Masarelli; Odalisque, and a stucco Study of Expression.

In 1897, he opened a studio in Rome, but soon moved back to Piedmont, as well as opening studios with assistants in Cagliari and Sassari. Among his church commissions were the statues of St Peter and Paul for Cuglieri, the Monument to the Fallen in the Wars of Independence in Cagliari; and a Monument to Vittorio Emanuele II in piazza Italia of Sassari, and three large statues of benefactors of a parish church of Ittireddu. Of the 235 monuments erected in the Cemetery of Iglesias, 65 are signed by Giuseppe Sartorio, and at least five others, are attributed to his workshop. The monuments in this cemetery include the monument to Zaira Deplano, a six-year-old, and a Monument to two sisters, Luigina e Maddalena.

== Death ==
Sartorio disappeared mysteriously in September 1922 during an ocean passage on the steamer "Tocra" traveling from Newfoundland to Civitavecchia. He was never found, and his ultimate fate is unknown.

== See also ==
- List of people who disappeared mysteriously at sea
