= Mildred (1797 ship) =

History

Great Britain
- Name: Mildred
- Owner: 1797:Moxon & Co.; 1799:Sharp & Co.
- Builder: Hull
- Launched: 1797
- Fate: Disappeared after 19 December 1799

General characteristics
- Tons burthen: 398, or 400, or 408 (bm)
- Propulsion: Sail
- Complement: 1797:32; 1799:45
- Armament: 1797:16 × 4-pounder guns; 1797:10 × 6-pounder guns; 1799:20 × 9&24-pounder guns; 1799:14 × 9-pounder guns + 6 × 24-pounder carronades

Mildred was launched in 1797 at Hull. She made one voyage to Bengal for the British East India Company (EIC). On her return she left for the West Indies. After she left Jamaica she was never heard from again.

== Career and loss ==
Mildred appeared in Lloyd's Register in 1797 with M. Jordan, master, and trade Hull—Gravesend.

The EIC engaged Mildred on 29 April 1798. Captain Michael Jordan acquired a letter of marque on 10 May 1797. He sailed from Torbay on 22 September 1797, bound for Bengal. Mildred was at St Helena on 1 December and at the Cape of Good Hope on 31 January 1798. She arrived at Calcutta on 3 May. Homeward bound, she was at Saugor on 11 August, the Cape on 22 October, and St Helena on 18 November. She arrived at the Downs on 3 February 1799.

On her return, new owners decided to sail her in the West Indies trade. Lloyd's Register for 1799 shows her master changing from Jordan to Atkinson, her owner from Moxon to Sharp, and her trade from London—India to London—Jamaica.

Captain Thomas Atkinson acquired a letter of marque on 13 July 1799.

== Fate ==
Mildred sailed from Jamaica for Savannah and London on 19 December 1799. She was never heard from again.

== See also ==
- List of people who disappeared mysteriously at sea
