= Ingvar Fredrik Håkansson =

Swedish fighter pilot in the Royal Air Force (1921–1944)

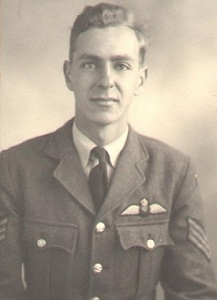
- Håkansson in RAF uniform in 1944
- Born: 4 September 1920; Birmingham, England
- Died: 9 July 1944 (aged 23); English Channel, off Dungeness, England
- Burial place: Runnymede Memorial
- Military career
- Allegiance: the Allies
- Branch: Royal Air Force
- Rank: Flight sergeant
- Nickname: Hackie/Hawkie
- Service number: 1575089
- Unit: Royal Air Force Volunteer Reserve 610 Sqdn

Ingvar Fredrik Håkansson (4 September 1920 – 9 July 1944) was a Swedish volunteer fighter pilot in the Royal Air Force (RAF) during the Second World War. Since Sweden was neutral in the war, Håkansson was one of few Swedes that served in RAF.

== Onset of the war ==
Håkansson's mother was British and his father a captain from Sweden. At the age of five, Håkansson moved with his family from the United Kingdom to Sweden and settled in the city of Gothenburg. In the summer of 1939 he became an apprentice engineer on one of the vessels of the Swedish shipping company Transatlantic.

In 1940, he found himself on a ship in South-America unable to go home to Sweden because war had started in Norway. At this time also, word reached him that Swedish vessels, including those of his father's shipping company were being bombed by the Germans despite Sweden's neutrality in the war. He decided to go to the UK, and disembarked his ship in the USA.

He then boarded a Norwegian ship and crossed the Atlantic to the UK. The journey was a risky one and several of the vessels in his convoy were torpedoed. However, Håkansson arrived safely in the UK and by this time he had made up his mind that he wanted to become a fighter pilot in RAF.

== Application to RAF ==
Upon his arrival in England, Håkansson applied at an RAF recruitment office in Birmingham. However, the application process would prove a long-drawn and arduous one. One of the factors obstructing enlistment was that he was not a British citizen and in addition came from a neutral country. Håkansson continued to send applications and commented in a radio interview: "I wrote numerous letters to London and all the paper that I used would be enough to fill the largest paper bin". Finally by the summer of 1941 he was accepted, and after several medical and knowledge tests he was ready to commence training.

== Operations in RAF ==
Håkansson received flight training in the UK and Canada, and by the summer of 1943 he was fully trained. He was first placed in 165 Squadron, where he flew a Spitfire IX. During a landing at RAF base Culmhead on 20 January 1944, his plane collided with that of fellow RAF pilot Eric Hamilton Francis, who died in the event. Håkansson sustained minor injuries and his Spitfire sustained category B damage. After his recovery, Håkansson was transferred to 610 Squadron where his unit escorted American bomber planes over occupied France.

=== Operation Diver and death ===
After the allied invasion of Normandy, Germany launched an attack against London with the new V-1 “robot” flying bombs. During this time so-called “Diver” operations were performed by RAF where the bombs were to be destroyed before they reached the UK. Håkansson too was put on such a Diver patrol. On Sunday 9 July 1944, Håkansson took off at dawn in his Spitfire XIV. A second pilot was to have joined Håkansson, but his plane was unserviceable and hence Håkansson set out alone. He succeeded in destroying two V-1s, but during his attack on a third the bomb exploded and he said over the radio that he would make an emergency exit by parachute. His last words were: "A robot is exploding – I am baling out!". He was then to have ejected from the aircraft over the sea a few miles off Dungeness. Despite searches by rescue planes and boats, no trace was ever found of Håkansson or his plane.

Håkansson is remembered at Runnymede Memorial in Surrey as well as in St George's Royal Air Force Chapel of Remembrance at the former RAF station Biggin Hill.

== See also ==
- List of people who disappeared mysteriously at sea
