= Earl Talbot (1797 EIC ship) =

Ship launched in 1797

- Plan of the Earl Talbot (1796), which the Royal Navy purchased on the stocks and launched as HMS Agincourt (1796). The Earl Talbot of 1797 was of the same size as its predecessor and almost surely used the same plans

History

Great Britain
- Name: Earl Talbot
- Namesake: Charles Chetwynd-Talbot, 2nd Earl Talbot
- Owner: William Moffatt
- Builder: Perry, Blackwall
- Laid down: 1796
- Launched: 12 January 1797
- Fate: Wrecked October 1800

General characteristics
- Tons burthen: 1200 (rated), or 1428, or 142810/94, or 1478 (bm)
- Length: 176 ft 10 in (53.9 m) (overall); 145 ft 6 1/2 in (44.4 m) (keel)
- Beam: 43 ft 3 in (13.2 m)
- Depth of hold: 17 ft 6 in (5.3 m)
- Propulsion: Sail
- Complement: 1797: 120; 1799:135
- Armament: 1797: 30 × 12-pounder guns; 1799: 36 × 6&12&18-pounder guns

Earl Talbot was launched in 1797 as an East Indiaman for the British East India Company (EIC). She made one complete voyage to Madras and China between 1797 and 1798. She was lost in October 1800 on her second voyage for the EIC.

She had been the follow on replacement of an earlier vessel commissioned by the EIC from the Blackwall yard, Mr. Perry; which had been requisitioned on the stocks by the Admiralty in 1796, and launched on 23 July 1796 as HMS Agincourt.

EIC Voyage #1 (1797-1798): Captain Jeremiah Dawkins received a letter of marque on 28 January 1797. (He had been captain of the predecessor Earl Talbot, which had been sold in 1793 for breaking up.) He sailed from Portsmouth on 18 March, bound for Madras and China. Earl Talbot reached Madras on 18 March. Dawkins died on 10 July. His replacement was his First Mate, John Dale.

The British government briefly hired her to use her as transport for an attack on Manila. A peace treaty with Spain forestalled the attack and the government released her after she had spent some 59 days waiting (for which it paid £1598 in demurrage).

Earl Talbot reached Penang on 5 September, and Malacca on 15 October, and arrived at Whampoa anchorage on 19 December. Homeward bound, Earl Talbot crossed the Second Bar on 1 March 1798, reached St Helena on 5 August, and arrived in the Downs on 18 October.

EIC Voyage #2 (1800-loss): Captain John Hamilton Dempster received a letter of marque on 11 December 1799. He sailed from Portsmouth on 7 January 1800, bound for Bombay and China. She left Bombay on 17 August. On 2 October she and several other Indiamen were sighted at the Anambas Islands.

Later that month Earl Talbot struck on the Perates, in the South China Sea some 300 miles to the southeast of Hong Kong, during a gale. (Note: One source gives a date of 22 October.) She foundered with the loss of all her passengers and crew, who numbered some 150 persons. Houghton was sailing from China to Bombay when she sighted the wreckage. Houghton reported the loss at Bombay. The EIC sent HCS Intrepid and Comet from Bombay to search for the cause of Earl Talbot's loss and to pick up any possible survivors. However, both disappeared without a trace and were presumed to have foundered at sea. The EIC put the value of the cargo it had lost on Earl Talbot at £2,603.
