= Amelia (1816 ship) =

History
- Name: Amelia
- Fate: Lost in 1816

General characteristics
- Type: Brig
- Tons burthen: 90 (bm)
- Propulsion: Sail

Amelia was a brig of 90 tons. She arrived at Sydney, Australia under the command of Samuel Shaw on 12 December 1815, with cargo from Calcutta. She was under the command of Shaw when she departed Port Jackson, Australia, sometime between 8 and 17 January 1816 on her way to Java and Canton, China. She was never heard from again. At the time of her disappearance, Amelia was carrying 50 tons of sandalwood and 5 tons of coal. The number of crew lost is unknown.
