= HCS Comet (1798) =

British Brig

History

Great Britain
- Name: HCS Comet
- Owner: British East India Company
- Builder: Bombay Dockyard
- Launched: 1798
- Fate: Foundered without a trace circa 1802

General characteristics
- Tons burthen: 115 (bm)
- Armament: 16 guns

The H[onourable] C[ompany's] S[hip] Comet was launched in 1798 by the Bombay Dockyard. She was a brig belonging to the British East India Company's naval arm, the Bombay Marine. She foundered without a trace in late 1800 or early 1801.

In October 1800 Earl Talbot struck on the Perates, in the South China Sea some 300 miles to the southeast of Hong Kong, during a gale. She foundered with the loss of all her passengers and crew, who numbered some 150 persons. Houghton was sailing from China to Bombay when she sighted the wreckage. Houghton reported the loss at Bombay.

In December the EIC sent two vessels, HCS Intrepid, Captain George Roper, and Comet, Lieutenant William Henry, from Bombay to the Paracel Islands to search for the cause of Earl Talbot's loss and to pick up any possible survivors. In February 1802 reports had reached London that although the two vessels had made many discoveries relating to natural history and geography, and had seen wreckage of other vessels on uninhabited islands, they had found nothing further concerning Lord Eldon.

The two vessels were still listed on the establishment of the Bombay Marine as of 1 January 1802. However, by 1803, there was a recognition that both Intrepid and Comet had disappeared without a trace. They were presumed to have foundered at sea.
