= Whale (ship) =

Ship lost at sea in 1816

History

New South Wales
- Name: Whale
- Namesake: Whale
- Launched: 1810
- Fate: Lost at sea, July 1816

General characteristics
- Tonnage: 14 tons
- Sail plan: Sloop

Whale was a ship that disappeared in 1816.

Whale was a sloop of 14 tons, built at Scotland Island, Pittwater, New South Wales in 1810. In July 1816, under the command of George Winney, the Whale headed out of Sydney bound for Hawkesbury and was never seen again. The master and two crew were presumed dead.
