= Albert Jewell =

American aviator

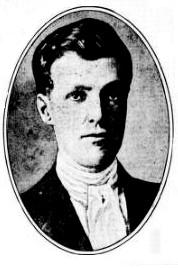
- Born: 1886; United States
- Died: October 13, 1913 (aged 27); North Atlantic, off Long Island, New York, USA
- Known for: Disappearance in 1913 on flight from Hempstead, Long Island, to Oakwood, Staten Island, New York
- Aviation career
- Flight license: 1913; New York

Albert Jewell (1886 – October 13, 1913) was an early US aviator who disappeared off Long Island, New York, on October 13, 1913, en route to Oakwood, Staten Island, in order to take part in The New York Times American Aerial Derby. No confirmed trace of Jewell or his aircraft was ever recovered. At the time, the press compared his likely fate to that of Cecil Grace and Edouard Jean Bague, who disappeared during flights over water (in December 1910 and June 1911 respectively).

== Air race ==
The New York Times American Aerial Derby was a race organised by the newspaper to commemorate the tenth anniversary of Orville Wright's first flight on December 17, 1903, in timed circuits, over a 60-mile (97.5 km) course starting and finishing in Oakwood. The competitors were J. Guy Gilpatrick (4th place), Tony Jannus (last), William S. Luckey (1st prize), Frank Niles (2nd prize) and C. Murvin Wood (3rd prize).

== Jewell's final flight ==
Jewell held a pilot's licence issued by the Aero Club of America; at the time of his disappearance, he had been flying for six months and he was an instructor at the Moisant Aviation School, though he had little experience of flights of the distance he was attempting. His last flight was planned to be from the Moisant Aviation School near Hempstead, Long Island to the Oakwood airfield from which the competitors in the race were due to depart. Jewell was flying a Moisant-Blériot monoplane, a version of the Blériot XI built under licence by the Moisant Aeroplane Company, Queens, New York, and, at least according to some reports, powered by a Gnome Lambda 80 hp rotary engine rather than the more normal Gnome Omega, 50 hp. Witnesses observed the aircraft off the south shore of Long Island, apparently being blown out to sea. The captain of a fishing vessel reported seeing an aircraft resembling Jewell's off Sandy Hook. As Jewell was unable to swim and his only flotation device was the inner tube of a tyre, his chances of surviving a ditching at sea were poor, even if he managed to get clear of the wreckage of his aircraft. An initial rumour that Jewell had been rescued from the sea by a merchant vessel proved to be unfounded.

== Searches and discoveries ==
Extensive searches on land and sea were conducted for Jewell and his aircraft. The Moisant Aeroplane Company sent six motor boats to search for Jewell and several automobiles joined the land search. Several of the aviators present in the New York area took part in these search efforts. On October 15, Tony Jannus and J. Robinson Hall, the race promoter, crashed when attempting to take off in a 70 hp Benoist tractor biplane; the aircraft was written off but the only injuries were minor burns and bruises to Hall. Luckey, the winner of the race, planned to conduct a search flight over Jamaica Bay on October 18. Searchers concentrated on Jamaica Bay and the sea off Rockaway Point where Jewell was last sighted. No signs of Jewell or of the wreckage of his aircraft were found.

Several rewards were offered for information which might reveal what accident had befallen Jewell and the location of his remains; $400 by the Aeronautical Society; $300 by the aviator's widow and $250 by the Moisant Aeroplane Company. Despite reports over the following months that Jewell's body had been recovered on at least two separate occasions, none of the human remains in question were positively identified as those of the aviator. On January 4, 1914, a human torso was washed up on the beach at Edgemere, Queens, following a storm and was suspected to be Jewell's. However, when called upon to identify the body, his widow excluded that possibility, on the basis of the remnants of clothing on the torso. This casts doubt on a report that a "badly bloated and disfigured body" washed up on Fire Island on October 25, 1913, was Jewell's.

== See also ==
- List of people who disappeared mysteriously at sea
