= List of missing aircraft =

List of aircraft that disappeared

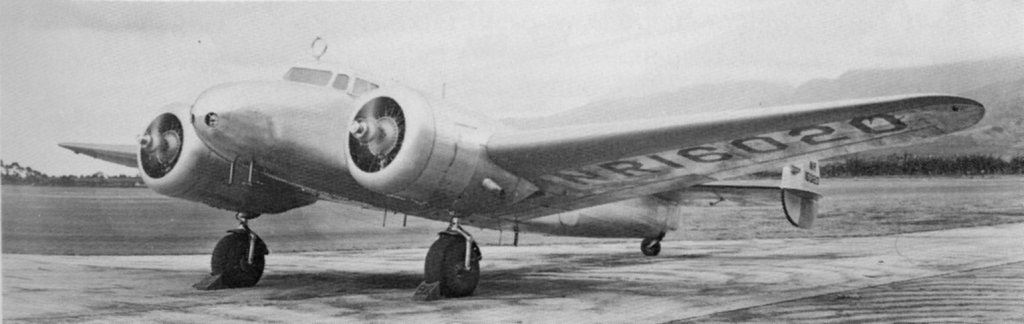
Amelia Earhart's missing modified Lockheed Model 10 Electra

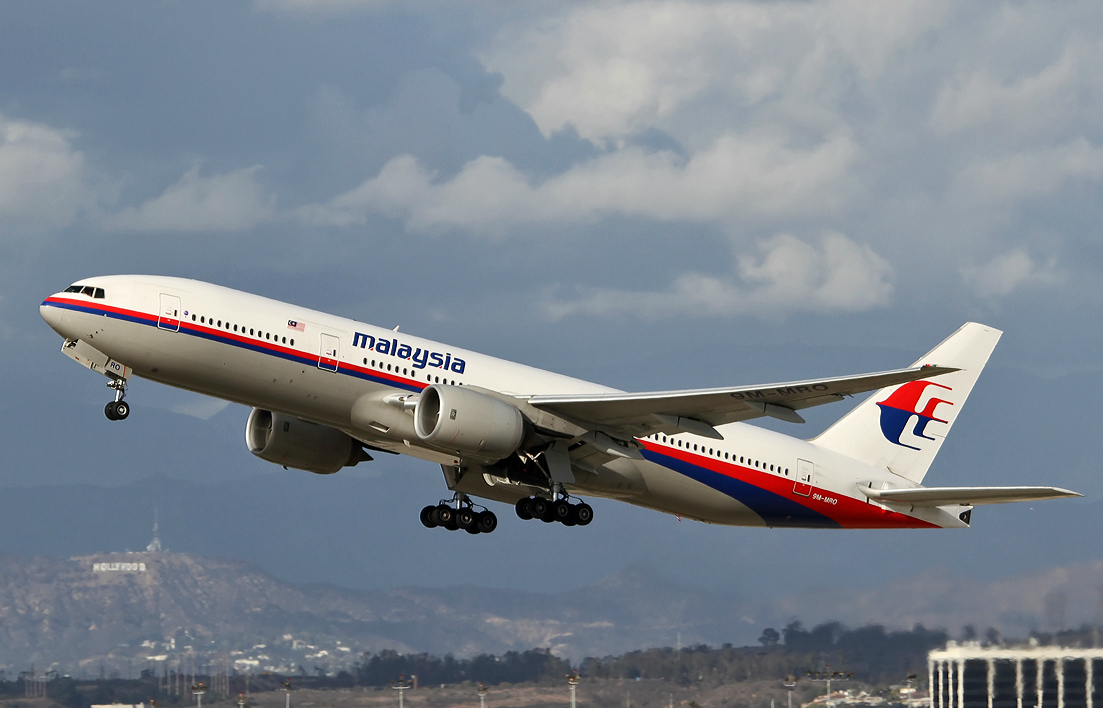
Malaysia Airlines Flight 370 is officially the flight with the most missing people (239 missing), although remains of the plane have been found in the Indian Ocean.

This list of missing aircraft includes aircraft that have disappeared and whose locations are unknown. According to Annex 13 of the International Civil Aviation Organization, an aircraft is considered to be missing "when the official search has been terminated and the wreckage has not been located". However, there still remains a "grey area" on how much wreckage needs to be found for a plane to be declared "recovered". This list does not include every aviator, or even every air passenger that has ever gone missing as these are separate categories.

In the tables below, each missing aircraft is defined (in the Aircraft column) using one or more identifying features. If the aircraft was known by a custom or personalized name (e.g. Pathfinder), that name is presented first (in italics) followed by the aircraft type (in parentheses). The make of aircraft, although not necessarily a unique identifier, is also provided where appropriate. Aircraft registrations began to be used in the early 20th century for individual identification, so this is also included in the later tables (in parentheses).

== Legend ==
- Civilian flight (private, commercial and cargo)
- Military flight (patrol, training, transport, etc.)
- Some wreckage was found, but aircraft never declared "recovered"

== 19th century ==
Date	Aircraft	People missing	Type of incident	Location (assumed)	Remarks
June 28, 1856	Ville de Paris (hot air balloon)	1 (Matías Pérez)	Unknown	North Atlantic Ocean (Straits of Florida)	The Cuban expression: Voló como Matías Pérez (meaning "He flew like Matias Perez") has since been known to be used when a person wishes to emphasize the situation of a missing person or object.
September 28, 1879	Pathfinder (hydrogen balloon)	2 (John Wise & George Burr)	Unknown	United States (Lake Michigan)	The body of George Burr was later recovered from Lake Michigan.
December 10, 1881	Saladin (hydrogen balloon)	1 (Walter Powell)	Loss of control	North Atlantic Ocean (Eype Mouth, UK)	Powell was MP for Malmesbury when he disappeared.
July 16, 1889	Peter Campbell Airship, America (demonstration flight)	1 (Edward D. Hogan)	Mechanical failure	North Atlantic Ocean (E. of Atlantic City, New Jersey)	This was one of Professor P. C. [Peter Carmant] Campbell's airships. The pilot was Edward D. Hogan (1852–1889).
July 14, 1897	Örnen (Eagle) (attempted North Pole flight)	3 (S. A. Andrée, Knut Frænkel, and Nils Strindberg)	Loss of control	Arctic Ocean (North of Svalbard)	This was part of a failed Swedish effort to reach the North Pole, resulting in the deaths of all three expedition members. While the bodies were later recovered, the balloon (other than some cloth) was never found.

== 20th century ==
=== 1901–1919 ===
Date	Aircraft	People missing	Type of incident	Location (assumed)	Remarks
December 1, 1907	Patrie (semi-rigid airship)	0	Mechanical problem & storm loss	Atlantic Ocean (off the Hebrides)	Stranded away from her base on 29 November, torn loose from moorings on 30 November, and last seen by a steamship on 1 December.
October 17, 1908	Pampero (coal gas balloon)	2 (Eduardo Newbery & Eduardo Romero)	Unknown	Argentina (River Plate)	First Argentines ever to perish in an aircraft accident
October 18, 1910	America (non-rigid airship)	0	Engine failure	North Atlantic Ocean (W. of Bermuda)	Occupants rescued by merchant vessel after abandoning ship
December 22, 1910	Cecil Grace; No. 3 (Short S.27)	1 (Cecil Grace)	Unknown	North Atlantic Ocean (English Channel)	Returning from unsuccessful attempt at Baron de Forest Prize en route from Calais to Dover. Body possibly found on March 14, 1911.
June 5, 1911	Blériot XI	1 (Édouard Bague)	Unknown	North Atlantic Ocean (Mediterranean, near Cap d'Antibes)	Attempted first flight across the Mediterranean
April 18, 1912	Blériot XI	1 (Damer Leslie Allen)	Unknown	North Atlantic Ocean (Irish Sea, near Anglesey)	Attempted first flight from Wales to Ireland
October 13, 1913	Blériot XI	1 (Albert Jewell)	Unknown	North Atlantic Ocean (S. of Long Island, NY)	Intended to compete in The New York Times American Aerial Derby.
March 14, 1914	Manuel Rodríguez (Sánchez-Besa biplane)	1 (Alejandro Bello Silva)	Unknown	Chile (Central)	Bello was undertaking a military training flight to become a pilot.
May 23, 1914	Morane-Saulnier (model unknown)	1 (Gustav Hamel)	Unknown	North Atlantic Ocean (English Channel)	This plane was en route from Hardelot to Hendon Aerodrome. An unidentified corpse was found on July 6, 1914, that might have been Hamel's.
November 7, 1916	LZ60 (Zeppelin)	0	Weather (storm loss)	North Atlantic Ocean (North Sea)	This Zeppelin was unmanned when it broke free of its mooring and drifted away.
October 17, 1918	Hewitt-Sperry Automatic Airplane; N-9	0	Malfunction	North Atlantic Ocean (S. of Long Island, NY)	Unmanned test flight, last seen over the Naval Air Station Bay Shore at an altitude of 4,000 feet (1220 m) heading east.
June 2, 1919	Sopwith Camel	1 (Mansell Richard James)	Unknown	United States (New England)	James was involved in an air race from Boston to New York City. Although wreckage was found, it was never positively identified.
December 9, 1919	Martinsyde (type A Mk.I)	2 (Cedric Howell & George H. Fraser)	Unknown	North Atlantic Ocean (Mediterranean, near St George's Bay, Corfu)	These two men were involved in an air race from England to Australia. The airframe & corpse of Cedric Howell (pilot) were eventually recovered.

=== 1920–1939 ===
Date	Aircraft	People missing	Type of incident	Location (assumed)	Remarks
April 24, 1924	Fokker F.III (H-NABS)	3	Unknown	Atlantic Ocean (North Sea)	KLM passenger flight from Lympne to Rotterdam
May 5, 1927	Farman F.61 Goliath (F-ADFN)	4	Unknown	Atlantic Ocean	SGTA cargo flight from St. Louis to Petrolina. A Brazilian fisherman claimed to have found a wheel from the missing plane June 18 that year.
May 8, 1927	L'Oiseau Blanc (Levasseur PL.8)	2 (François Coli & Charles Nungesser)	Unknown	North Atlantic Ocean or Maine	This was an attempted transatlantic flight competing for the Orteig Prize.
May 26, 1927	Airco DH.9 (G-IAAB)	2 (John James Crofts Cocks & LAC Rowston)	Unknown	Turkey (Konya & Eskişehir or Kütahya & Bandırma)	Cocks and Rowston left on a private flight on May 11 from Lahore, British India to Lympne, England.
August 16, 1927	Golden Eagle (NX913)	2 (Jack Frost & Gordon Scott)	Unknown	North Pacific Ocean	Competitor in Dole Air Race.
August 16, 1927	Miss Doran (NX2915)	3 (John "Augie" Pedlar, Vilas R. Knope & Mildred Doran)	Unknown	North Pacific Ocean	Competitor in Dole Air Race.
August 19, 1927	Dallas Spirit (NX941)	2 (William Portwood Erwin & Alvin Eichwaldt)	Unknown	North Pacific Ocean	Competitor in Dole Air Race, searching for Miss Doran & Golden Eagle.
August 31, 1927	Saint Raphael (Fokker F.VIIA)	3 (Frederick F. Minchin, Leslie Hamilton & Princess Anne of Löwenstein-Wertheim-Freudenberg)	Unknown	North Atlantic Ocean (near Newfoundland)	Attempted transatlantic flight (east to west).
November 16, 1927	Junkers F13 (with floats) K-SALD	4	Weather (presumed)	Gulf of Finland	Aero OY passenger flight from Tallinn to Helsinki carrying two Finnish Army officers, a pilot, and a flight mechanic. Extreme fog present at time of disappearance. Finnish Air Force and Navy and Estonian Navy searches found no trace of the aircraft.
December 23, 1927	The Dawn (Sikorsky S-36)	4 (Oskar Omdal, Brice Goldsborough, Frank Koehler & Frances Wilson Grayson)	Unknown	North Atlantic Ocean (near Nova Scotia)	Intended to attempt Newfoundland to London flight.
January 10, 1928	Aotearoa (Ryan B-1 Brougham, G-AUNZ)	2 (John Robert Moncrieff & George Hood)	Unknown	South Pacific Ocean (Tasman Sea)	Departed from Sydney, Australia for Trentham, New Zealand. Radio signals ceased when the aircraft should have been about two hours out from New Zealand; see Moncrieff and Hood disappearance
March 13, 1928	Endeavour (Stinson SM-1 Detroiter)	2 (Walter G. R. Hinchliffe & Elsie Mackay)	Unknown	North Atlantic Ocean	Attempted transatlantic flight (east to west).
May 25, 1928	Italia (airship)	6 (Aldo Pontremoli, Renato Alessandrini, Ugo Lago, Ettore Arduino, Calisto Ciocca & Attilio Caratti)	Crash landing	North Atlantic Ocean (Barents Sea)	One person died in the crash, subsequent searches were unsuccessful. Notable people who disappeared included Aldo Pontremoli.
June 18, 1928	Latham 47.02	6	Unknown	North Atlantic Ocean (Barents Sea)	This group was searching for survivors of the missing airship Italia. Roald Amundsen and René Guilbaud were among the missing attempted rescuers.
September 6, 1928	R.1 Blackburn (N9834)	3	Unknown	North Atlantic Ocean (North Sea)	Pilot Officer Samuel Hatton, Lt. Charles Sheldon Booth RN and Telegraphist Edmund George Bourke Grigson missing; No. 422 (Fleet Spotter) Flight, HMS Argus.
August 19, 1929	Jung Schweizerland (Farman F.190, CH-245)	2	Unknown	North Atlantic Ocean	Disappeared with 2 Swiss pilots during attempted transatlantic flight from Lisbon to New York.
December 24, 1929	CMASA/Dornier Do J Wal Asso 500 Cabina (I-AZDB)	5	Ditching	North Atlantic Ocean (Aegean Sea)	Aero Espresso Italiana flight from Istanbul to Athens. Signaled passing Isola d'Strati at 12:30 but made an emergency landing at 13:00 near Agios Eustratios at 39.336489, 24.755684. Nothing found.
December 26, 1929	de Havilland DH.60M Moth (N-42)	2	Unknown	Antarctica (South Pole area)	Hvalfangstselskapet Kosmos A/S aircraft flying out of the whaling vessel Kosmos. Pilot Leif Lier and observer Dr. Ingvald Schreiner lost.
November 21, 1930	Dornier Do R4 Superwal (I-RONY)	6	Unknown	North Atlantic Ocean (Mediterranean Sea)	SANA passenger flight from Barcelona to Marseille. Last known radio contact was at 09:40 off of Cap de Creus. Part of the wreckage was found on December 5, 30 miles off between Leucate and Port-Vendres.
February 1, 1932	Fairchild (model and registration unknown)	5	Unknown	North Atlantic Ocean (Straits of Florida)	Disappeared during a 45-minute Bimini Airlines flight from Miami to Bimini. Piloted by Cal Chik, the passengers were suspected bootlegger Phillip Mannes and three unnamed employees (two white and one black). Search called off February 3rd.
May 30, 1932	de Havilland DH.60 Moth (CF-AGL)	2	Unknown	North Atlantic Ocean (near St. Anthony, Newfoundland and Labrador)	Arthur Sullivan (pilot), Dr Kurt K. (Karl) Kuenhert vanished on pleasure flight.
August 12, 1932	Avro 616 Avian IVM (G-AAKA)	2	Unknown	Indian Ocean (Gulf of Martaban)	English planters, G.W. Salt and F.B. Taylor left for England on a pleasure flight.
September 14, 1932	The American Nurse (Bellanca CH-400 Skyrocket, NR796W)	3	Unknown	North Atlantic Ocean (near Cape Finisterre, Spain)	Attempted New York City to Rome flight
June 20, 1933	Cuatro Vientos (Br.19 TF Super Bidon)	2	Unknown	Mexico (near Villahermosa)	The duo were on their final leg of the flight that went from Seville to Mexico City.
July 18, 1933	CMASA Wal (I-AZEE)	6	Ditching	North Atlantic Ocean (Aegean Sea)	Aero Espresso Italiana flight from Athens to Rhodes forced to ditch due to gale-force winds. SAR operations by Greece and Italy were unsuccessful.
December 3, 1934	Stella Australis (Airspeed Envoy)	3	Fuel starvation	North Pacific Ocean (near Hawaii)	Charles Ulm disappeared along with copilot G.M. Littlejohn and navigator/radio operator J.S. Skilling. It is most probable that the aircraft overflew Hawaii.
December 21, 1934	Trimotor Hydroplane (Bach 3-CT-6 Air Yacht, NC850E)	7	Unknown	Pacific Ocean (Gulf of California)	Líneas Aéreas Occidentales (LAO) passenger flight from Mazatlán to La Paz. 2 Americans (pilot and mechanic) and 5 Mexicans (2 male, 2 female, and a female infant) on board; no trace found.
November 8, 1935	Lady Southern Cross (Lockheed Altair)	2 (Charles Kingsford Smith & John T. Pethybridge)	Unknown	Indian Ocean (Andaman Sea)	Attempt to break the England to Australia speed record. Only the undercarriage leg and wheel has ever been found.
January 21, 1936	Dauphine (CAMS 53-1, F-AJIR)	6	Engine failure	North Atlantic Ocean (Mediterranean Sea)	Air France passenger flight from Marseille to Ajaccio and Tunis. Vanished off of Corsica after sending a distress call.
February 10, 1936	Ville de Buenos Aires (Latécoère 301, F-AOIK)	6	Weather (storm loss)	South Atlantic Ocean (near Saint Peter and Saint Paul Archipelago)	Notable people lost include Émile Barrière. The nonstop flight from Natal, Brazil was operated by Air France.
February 15, 1936	Tornado (Dornier Do J-2F Bos Wal, D-ADYS)	4	Unknown	South Atlantic Ocean	Lost during a Deutsche Lufthansa cargo flight from Natal to Bodensee via Bathurst.
December 7, 1936	Croix-du-Sud (Latécoère 300)	5	Engine failure (presumed)	South Atlantic Ocean	A final incomplete radio message reported engine failure minutes after the last position report. Notable lost passengers included Jean Mermoz.
February 15, 1937	Blackburn Shark (K5619)	3	Unknown	North Atlantic Ocean (Mediterranean Sea)	The crew of this military patrol included Sub-Lt George Eric Lake, Lt Roderick W. MacDonald, & Telegraphist William H. Currie. They were all from the 821st Naval Air Squadron Fleet Air Arm of HMS Courageous.
July 2, 1937	Lockheed Electra 10E (NR 16020)	2 (Amelia Earhart & Fred Noonan)	Fuel starvation (most likely)	Central Pacific Ocean (Numerous theories exist on location)	This is perhaps one of the most famous aerial disappearances of all time. Amelia Earhart and Fred Noonan were on their third-from-last leg of an attempted round-the-world flight when they went missing. At the time, the search for Earhart was the largest of its kind in history.
August 13, 1937	Bolkhovitinov DB-A (prototype)	6	Unknown	Arctic Ocean	Sigizmund Levanevsky was among the passengers that went missing. This was an attempted long-distance flight from Moscow to Fairbanks, Alaska, via the North Pole. Possible wreckage of the plane was sighted on the sea floor in 1999.
October 27, 1937	Antares (Dewoitine D.333, F-ANQA)	6	Unknown	North Atlantic Ocean (near El Jadida)	Air France passenger flight from Dakar to Toulouse lost before a stopover in Casablanca. Crew reported passing Agadir at 03:05 but sent an SOS call received at 04:23. 2 mail bags washed up on the beach, but no wreckage was recovered.
February 13, 1938	CANT Z-506 (I-ORIA)	14	Weather (presumed)	North Atlantic Ocean (Mediterranean Sea)	Ala Littoria flight from Cádiz to Rome with stopovers in Pollença and Alghero, lost in a storm shortly after second stop at 14:30.
April 4, 1938	Vickers Vildebeest Mark II (K2944)	3	Unknown	North Pacific Ocean (Singapore Strait)	The flight crew consisted of Sgt. W.D.M. Roberts (pilot), AC1 E.J. Beisly & AC1 M.R. Hunter of No. 100 Sqn RAF, RAF Seletar, Singapore.
April 17, 1938	Taylor Cub	1 (Andrew Carnegie Whitfield)	Unknown	North Atlantic Ocean (near Long Island, United States)	This was a private flight.
July 28, 1938	Hawaii Clipper (Martin M-130, NC14714)	15	Unknown	North Pacific Ocean (East of the Philippine coast)	Main article: Pan Am Flight 229
August 6, 1938	Hawker Hector (K9759)	1	Unknown	North Atlantic Ocean (North Sea off Blackhall Rocks)	Lost: P/O Douglas St Quentin Robinson, No. 13 Sqn RAF, RAF Odiham.
August 8, 1938	Avro Anson (K8831)	4	Unknown	North Atlantic Ocean (North Sea off Bridlington)	Lost: Sgt. Cecil Joseph Le Patrick Gordon (pilot), AC2 Thomas Charles Andrews, AC1 Melville George Brand, AC1 Leslie Freeman, No. 233 Sqn RAF, RAF Thornaby.
October 1, 1938	Pampero (Dornier Do 18, D-AROZ)	5	Unknown	North Atlantic Ocean (off Bathurst)	Deutsche Lufthansa flight from Natal that was just a few minutes from landing.
October 6, 1938	Handley Page H.P.54 Harrow (K6971)	3	Weather (storm loss)	North Atlantic Ocean (English Channel off Dungeness)	Lost: F/O D.A. Hamilton, P/O R.N. Haynes, P/O T.I.S. Munro, LAC C.S. Lodge & AC1 T. Prowse, No. 215 Sqn, RAF Honington, Suffolk.
May 9, 1939	Westland Wallace (K3570)	2	Fouling of tail by towing cable	North Atlantic Ocean (North Sea)	Lost: P/O M.T. Lloyd & AC J. Flannery of No. 1 Air Armament School.
May 16, 1939	Monocoupe 90A (SE-AGM/NX19421)	1	Unknown	North Atlantic Ocean	Swedish-American pilot Carl Backman took the registration SE-AGM from a Areonca C-3 in his hometown of Leksand and used on this plane on an attempted flight from the US to Sweden. Planned route was from St. Louis to Rommehed with stops in Bangor and Gander; disappeared on last leg of flight.
August 9, 1939	Vickers Wellington I (L4258)	5	Unknown	North Atlantic Ocean (North Sea)	Lost: F/O T.A. Darling, P/O F.E. Board, A/Sgt A. Linkley, AC1 R.C.B, Collins & AC1 J.W. Sadler of No. 149 Sqn RAF.
August 11, 1939	Shalom (Ryan C-2 Foursome)	2	Unknown	North Atlantic Ocean	NYC to Palestine flight by Betar activists Alex Loeb and Richard Decker.
August 19, 1939	Supermarine Stranraer	6	Unknown	North Atlantic Ocean (North Sea)	Lost: Act. Flt. Lt. F.E.R. King, F/O A.F. Barber, LAC D. Fulcher, AC1 D.G.P. Ash, AC1 L.S. Freshwater & AC1 W.J. Jeckells, No. 209 Sqn RAF, RAF Invergordon, Ross & Cromarty.

=== 1940–1959 ===
Date	Aircraft	People missing	Type of incident	Location (assumed)	Remarks
March 1, 1940	Hannibal (Handley Page H.P.42, G-AAGX)	8	Crash landing	Indian Ocean (Gulf of Oman)	Four crew and four passengers were lost on this passenger flight. Wreckage washed up on the Iranian coast at Ras al Kuh, 40 km (25 miles) east of Jask.
November 27, 1940	SNCAC NC.223.4 (F-AROA)	7	Shot down (possibly)	North Atlantic Ocean (Mediterranean Sea off Teluada, Sardinia)	Lost during Marseille-Bizerte-Beirut-Damascus mail flight. Jean Chiappe was a passenger. Possibly strayed into battle zone.
January 15, 1941	Savoia-Marchetti SM-75C (I-BAYR)	10	Ditching	Atlantic Ocean (off Fernando de Noronha)	LATI passenger flight from Natal to Sal. Pilot was forced to ditch after No. 2 (center) engine lost power and all cargo was dumped. No trace of plane found. (Other sources say flight was headed for Dakar.)
July 2, 1941	Lisunov PS-84 (CCCP-L3467)	3	Unknown	Russia (possibly near Lipetsk)	Aeroflot plane left Vnukovo on a mission but vanished. The pilot was found alive in a Tashkent hospital with burns and wounds on January 10, 1942, but could not recall what happened to the plane or remaining 3 crew members.
January 10, 1942	Consolidated PBY Catalina (Y-58)	6	Unknown	off Kema, Indonesia	The Dutch Navy aircraft disappeared following a raid on the Japanese fleet at Kema. Two other Catalinas flying with Y-58 landed safely.
February 2, 1942	Lisunov PS-84 (CCCP-L3920)	6	Unknown	possibly Kalinin region, Soviet Union	Aeroflot aircraft went missing while returning from a flight behind German lines.
March 21, 1942	Lisunov PS-84 (CCCP-L3975)	6	Unknown	near Medyn, Soviet Union	Aeroflot aircraft went missing on a flight from Monino to an area behind German lines.
March 26, 1942	Airspeed Oxford (NZ278)	3	Weather (probable)	Canterbury Bight, New Zealand	RNZAF training aircraft disappeared on a navigation exercise.
June 5, 1942	Consolidated PBY Catalina (05023)	9	Unknown	Gulf of Mexico	US Navy aircraft disappeared during a navigation flight over the Gulf of Mexico.
June 8, 1942	Consolidated PBY Catalina (044604)	10	Unknown	off Newfoundland	US Navy aircraft went missing on a convoy patrol northeast of Newfoundland.
June 14, 1942	Lisunov PS-84 (CCCP-L4001)	Unknown	Unknown	Vyazma area, Smolensk region, Soviet Union	Aeroflot aircraft went missing during a mission in the Vyazma area.
July 14, 1942	Consolidated PBY Catalina (04463)	9	Unknown	Pacific Ocean off Alaska	US Navy aircraft went missing on patrol out of NAS Sand Point.
July 14, 1942	Lockheed C-60 Lodestar (VHCAD)	3	Unknown	Australia	RAAF aircraft lost without trace between Townsville and Cooktown.
July 25, 1942	Short Sunderland (L5806)	13	Unknown	Mediterranean Sea off Egyptian coast	RAF aircraft of 230 Sqn went missing during an anti-submarine patrol mission over the Mediterranean Sea; likely crashed at sea somewhere off the Egyptian coast.
August 17, 1942	Short Sunderland (L2158)	9	Unknown	off Sierra Leone	RAF aircraft of 204 Sqn. missing off Sierra Leone while on convoy escort.
August 18, 1942	North American Harvard (NZ964)	1	Unknown	Marlborough, New Zealand	Aerobatic training flight failed to return to RNZAF Base Woodbourne.
August 28, 1942	Boeing B-17E (41-9146)	9	Weather	off Umnak Island	USAAF aircraft failed to return from a bombing raid against Kiska Island with two other aircraft after becoming separated from the formation while flying through a storm. The last radio transmission from the aircraft stated that the aircraft only had one hour of fuel left. The two other B-17s were able to return safely. No wreckage or remains have been found.
December 8, 1942	Vickers Vincent (NZ332)	3	Unknown	Off the East coast of Wairarapa, New Zealand	RNZAF aircraft failed to return after searching for an unidentified merchant vessel.
December 17, 1942	Consolidated PBY Catalina (08135)	7	Weather (probable)	Pacific Ocean	US Navy aircraft went missing during a flight out of NAS Kaneohe. The aircraft became separated from two accompanying aircraft over the Pacific in bad weather. The final radio contact mentioned that the crew was flying at 7000 feet (2135 m) on instruments and descending.
January 3, 1943	Consolidated PBY Catalina (08097)	8	Unknown	Atlantic Ocean	US Navy aircraft went missing on patrol out of NAS Quonset Point.
January 16, 1943	Consolidated PBY Catalina (2310)	5	Unknown	off Brunswick, GA	US Navy aircraft went missing off Brunswick, Georgia.
January 18, 1943	Consolidated C-87 Liberator Express (41-11708)	26	Unknown	North Atlantic Ocean (off Natal)	USAAF flight from Accra to Natal. Wide search, called off January 29. A life raft with the body of one passenger was found 96 km east of Recife by the US destroyer Kearney on February 4, and another life raft with the body of major Arthur Mills and 6 life jackets was found on the beach of Ponte Negra the following day.
January 24, 1943	Douglas C-47 (41-38688)	9	Unknown	Unknown	USAAF aircraft crashed en route from Borinquen Field, Puerto Rico.
January 26, 1943	Douglas C-53 (41-20128)	9	Unknown	Sookerating, India	USAAF aircraft disappeared en route from Yunnanyi to Sookerating. Aircraft and crew remain missing as of August 1944.
January 31, 1943	Douglas Dakota (MA929)	6	Unknown	northeastern Burma	RAF aircraft of 31 Sqn. took off from Dinjan for Fort Hertz, but failed to arrive. A Hudson pilot saw the aircraft at 1400 flying at 7000 feet (2135 m) near Kamku, heading for Fort Hertz.
March 13, 1943	Douglas C-53 (49)	3	Unknown	Patkai Range, Burma	CNAC aircraft went missing over the Himalayas while flying a cargo of 50 kg (110 lb) tin bars to Dinjan.
April 17, 1943	de Havilland Dragon	5	Unknown	New South Wales, Australia	Dragon DH84A, A34-47 of 34 Squadron RAAF went missing on a flight between Mascot Airfield, in Sydney and Essendon Airfield in Melbourne via Forest Hill on Saturday 17 April 1943. The wreckage of this aircraft has never been found. RAAF and US Marine Corps personnel were presumed killed in this accident.
July 1, 1943	Curtiss C-46A (41-12298)	5	Mid-air collision (probable)	Between Tezpur and Kunming	Disappeared during a Tezpur-Kunming cargo flight. Another C-46A, 41-12295, flew the same route as 41-12298 at the same time. Flying at 17,000 feet on instruments, the weather was so poor that the crew could not see the wingtips. When this C-46 landed, damage was found on the right wing tip and there was a dent on the right top side of the fuselage. The right wing tip de-icer boot had paint on it and the dent was consistent with a vertical object striking the aircraft. It was thought that the two aircraft had accidentally collided in mid-air.
July 8, 1943	Tachikawa Ki-77	8	Shot down (probable)	Indian Ocean	Attempted flight from Singapore to Sarabus (now Hvardiiske, Crimea). The people lost consisted of five IJA passengers and three crew members which included Kenji Tsukagoshi. The flight was likely intercepted by RAF fighters over the Indian Ocean as data is known through decrypted communications.
July 10, 1943	Douglas C-47A (42-23596)	5	Unknown	off Trinidad-Waller Field	USAAF aircraft disappeared during a ferry flight.
July 11, 1943	Douglas C-47 (42-5686 and 42-5687)	Unknown	Unknown	off Sicily	During the Allied invasion of Sicily, 144 C-47s dropped 2200 paratroopers at Gela. The first two formations dropped their paratroopers squarely on target without incident. But when the next formations appeared over the shoreline, Allied forces opened fire on naval vessels and shore troops. The 52nd Troop Carrier Wing lost 23 C-47s to friendly fire with 83 dead, while the 504th Parachute Infantry Regiment had 81 dead. 42-5686 and 42-5687 were two of the C-47s lost.
July 13, 1943	Douglas C-47 (41-18518)	4	Unknown	Between Mohanbari and Kunming	Disappeared between Mohanbari and Kunming. Last radio transmission from the aircraft was at 14:18 IST when the aircraft was near Sookerating. The crew had asked for weather information of Yunnanyi.
August 3, 1943	Consolidated Catalina (FP114)	13	Unknown	Atlantic Ocean	RAF aircraft of 202 Sqn disappeared during a ferry flight from Castle Archdale to Gibraltar.
August 14, 1943	Curtiss C-46A (41-12403)	4	Weather (probable)	China	Disappeared during a flight over The Hump from Chabua to Kunming. The crew's last radio contact stated that they were flying over the mountains and had no mechanical difficulties. Major storms were forecast along the flight route.
August 21, 1943	Lisunov Li-2 (CCCP-L4034)	Unknown	Unknown	near Akhtyrka, Ukraine	Aeroflot aircraft disappeared during a flight from Oboyan to an area behind German lines, 20 km (12 mi) east of Mirgorod. Last seen flying over the front line near Akhtyrka.
August 27, 1943	Lisunov Li-2 (CCCP-L4047)	6	Shot down (likely)	Unknown	Aeroflot aircraft disappeared following an attack by a Luftwaffe fighter. All 6 crew declared MIA and presumed dead.
October 2, 1943	Consolidated PBY Catalina (05013)	9	Fuel leak (suspected)	Gulf of Mexico	US Navy aircraft missing on a flight out of NAS Pensacola.
October 20, 1943	Douglas C-47A (42-23965)	15	Unknown	off Palmyra Island Atoll	USAAF aircraft disappeared en route to Palmyra Island. The aircraft's last known position was 80 km (50 mi) north-northeast of Palmyra Island, flying above overcast.
October 29, 1943	Emei (Douglas C-47A)	22	Unknown	between India and China	ROC Air Force aircraft disappeared on a Dinjan-Kunming transport flight. Wreckage has never been found as of 2024.
November 6, 1943	Consolidated PBY Catalina (34035)	9	Unknown	Pacific Ocean	US Navy aircraft disappeared during a ferry flight from NAS San Diego to NAS Kaneohe.
November 13, 1943	Short Sunderland III (DD863)	11	Engine failure (probable)	off Mayo, Ireland	RAF aircraft disappeared during a convoy escort mission. The crew had reported engine problems and stated they were returning to base. Strong sea conditions were reported at the time.
November 23, 1943	Douglas C-47 Skytrain (41-18675)	25	Weather (suspected)	Nakety Bay, New Caledonia	USAAF aircraft took off from Tontouta Airport, bound for Espiritu Santo. Radio contact established at 08:10, but aircraft failed to respond an hour later. Damaged gear and personal effects found two days later, but no bodies were ever found. A cold front had passed through the area on the morning of the flight, reducing ceiling and visibility. The route was flyable under IFR and several aircraft flew it that day with no incident.
November 24, 1943	Curtiss C-46A (41-12287)	1	Unknown	between Sookerating and Kunming	Shot down by a Japanese A6M Zero shortly after clearing the ceiling to clear mountains. Copilot G.W. Black survived an eight-day walk out. Pilot R.L Wilson and crewman G. Winkleman also survived, but radio operator S. Florian died while exiting the aircraft from wing debris.
December 19, 1943	Short Sunderland III (DW106)	19	Unknown	Atlantic Ocean off Portuguese coast	RAF aircraft disappeared on a flight from RAF Pembroke to Gibraltar. Reportedly a IFF distress signal was picked up 30 mi off Cape St Vincent by Sunderland EK589 which was following DW106. A thorough search of the area turned up nothing.
December 27, 1943	Douglas R4D (12432)	24	Unknown	New Caledonia and Vanuatu	US Navy aircraft disappeared over the Pacific Ocean between Noumea and Espiritu Santo.
December 30, 1943	Consolidated PBY Catalina (33963)	6	Unknown	Pacific Ocean	US Navy aircraft disappeared during a flight from Baker Island to Makin Island.
January 17, 1944	Consolidated PBY Catalina (34018)	8	Unknown	off Adak, Alaska	US Navy aircraft disappeared while on patrol out of NAS Adak.
February 3, 1944	Vought F4U Corsair (22 aircraft lost)	6	Weather	Central Pacific	23 USMC F4U Corsair fighter aircraft of the Marine fighter squadron VMF-422 took off at 10:00 at Hawkins Field, bound for Funafuti. 24th Corsair had developed engine problems and returned back to Hawkins Field. At 1230 hrs., still short of Nanumea, the squadron encountered a massive Pacific cyclone measuring nearly 150 miles (240 km) in diameter and reaching to more than 50,000 feet, (15,300 m). Having little choice, the pilots flew into the storm and were immediately blown far to the south and east by the clockwise rotation of the cyclone, which carried them beyond Nanumea. Only one of the pilots managed to get a fix on the Funafuti radio range and landed safely. Other 22 Corsairs were lost, with six aviators being never found. The rest of the 16 aviators who had either ditched or bailed out, all were eventually rescued at sea. It was the worst non-combat loss of a Marine squadron in the war.
February 13, 1944	Douglas C-47A (CCCP-L846)	5	Unknown	Unknown	Aeroflot aircraft disappeared while on a flight from Kudrovo (near Leningrad) to an area behind German lines. Last contact was over enemy territory at 22:35.
February 17, 1944	Douglas C-47A (CCCP-L847)	6	Unknown	near Tartu, Estonia	Aeroflot aircraft disappeared while on a flight from Kudrovo (near Leningrad) to the area of Tartu to paradrop a reconnaissance team behind German lines.
February 21, 1944	Joachim Blankenburg (Junkers Ju 52/3m, D-AWAS)	16	Engine failure (possible)	North Atlantic Ocean (Mediterranean Sea within Aegean Sea off of Euboea, Greece)	Lost during a Deutsche Lufthansa passenger flight from Thessaloniki to Athens. Issued a pan-pan after having engine issues over the sea but no wreckage was recovered.
February 27, 1944	Lisunov Li-2 (CCCP-L4076)	6	Unknown	between Nikopol and Krivoi Rog	Aeroflot aircraft disappeared while on a flight from Melitopol to an area behind German lines in support of the offensive of the 3rd Ukrainian Front. All on board declared MIA and presumed dead.
March 17, 1944	Douglas Dakota (FL650)	3	Unknown	off British Columbia	RCAF aircraft disappeared on a night navigation exercise. The aircraft took off at 19:40 and last contact was at 21:58. Despite an exhaustive search, neither the aircraft nor its crew were found and the crew were declared missing and presumed dead. Two oxygen cylinders of the type used on Dakotas were later recovered in the Pearse Island Group, northern Vancouver Island.
April 2, 1944	Douglas C-47A (42-92815)	5	Unknown	Pacific Ocean	USAAF aircraft disappeared during a flight from Fairfield, California to Honolulu, Hawaii. The aircraft took off at 02:37 GCT and last contact was at 08:05 GCT. The search for the aircraft was discontinued on April 9.
April 28, 1944	Consolidated PBY Catalina (A24-49)	10	Forced landing (possible)	off Babo, Indonesia	RAAF aircraft disappeared on a flight from Groote Island to attack Manokwari, but it never made it there and reportedly force-landed about two days walk from Babo. All on board declared MIA.
May 18, 1944	Douglas R4D (39073)	23	Weather (probable)	between Torokina and Guadalcanal	US Navy transport aircraft disappeared on a flight from Torokina to Guadalcanal with 23 on board and 1300 pounds of mail. Last radio contact with the aircraft was during takeoff. Weather at the time was poor with moderate rain showers reducing visibility from six miles to one mile.
May 21, 1944	Consolidated PBY Catalina (A24-73)	9	Unknown	Java Sea	RAAF aircraft disappeared during a sea mining mission in the Java Sea near Surabaya. A signal was received that both fuel tanks had been badly holed and an attempt was to be made to get to an escape point. Despite searches, neither the aircraft nor its crew were found.
June 1, 1944	Douglas Dakota (FZ563)	7	Weather (probable)	near Myitkyina, Burma	RAF aircraft of 215 Sqn, India was one of 18 which left Sylhet in formation at 06:00 to drop supplies in Burma. In company with five other aircraft, FZ563 was to drop at position 25.10°N 96.26°E. Last seen near Myitkyina dropping supplies on the target at 08:45. At the time it was raining with extremely bad weather conditions on the entire flight route. The pilot probably attempted to return under the cloud base. All other aircraft were able to return but nothing was heard of FZ563 nor its crew.
June 7, 1944	Douglas Dakota (KG480)	Unknown	Shot down (probable)	near Ranville, France	RAF aircraft went missing from a supply drop mission during the Normandy invasion. Probably shot down by naval anti-aircraft fire.
July 26, 1944	Douglas C-54A Skymaster (42-107470)	26	Unknown	North Atlantic Ocean (SE of Greenland)	Military transport carrying wounded personnel. Lost passengers included Leon Vance.
August 23, 1944	Beechcraft AT-10 (2144BU)	2	Weather (presumed)	Unknown	Army and Air Force searched for missing plane by air and ground for days but no trace of the plane, pilot, or navigator were ever found. Those lost were Oma Gordon Capps & an unknown navigator.
October 26, 1944	P-51 Mustang	1	Unknown	North Pacific Ocean (Santa Monica Bay)	On October 26, 1944 Gertrude Tompkins Silver departed from Mines Field (Los Angeles International Airport) for Palm Springs flying a North American P-51D Mustang destined for New Jersey, but she never arrived at Palm Spring. Silver is the only known Women Airforce Service Pilots member to go missing during World War II.
December 15, 1944	UC-64 Norseman (44-70285)	3	Unknown	North Atlantic Ocean (English Channel)	No trace of the aircrew, passengers or plane found, possibly overflew bomb jettisoning area. Lost: Glenn Miller, F/O John Morgan & Lt. Col. Norman F. Baessell.
January 22, 1945	Douglas C-47A-80-DL (43-15384)	1	Unknown	China (80 kilometers (50 miles) from Lüliang)	C-47 transport headed from Chihchiang to Ganzhou. Turned back after encountering poor weather but was told to dump their load and go to Chanyi. A freighter pilot saw the crew bail out but the wreckage could not be located. 3 of the 4 occupants returned on the 29th but the fourth was never seen again.
February 26, 1945	C-87A Liberator Express (41-24174, c/n 969)	3+	Unknown	Central Pacific Ocean	Military transport flight piloted by F. E. Savage disappeared for unknown reasons. There were known safety issues with the aircraft type that might have played a factor. The exact number of passengers lost is unknown, but at least three were identified to have been on the flight. Two of the passengers were Millard Harmon and James Roy Andersen.
March 27, 1945	Commando (Liberator B Mk II (LB-30), AL504)	7+	Unknown	North Atlantic Ocean (near Azores)	At least seven passengers including Sir Peter Drummond were lost when this military transport flight went missing.
May 30, 1945	Douglas C-47B (44-76406)	21	Unknown	Atlantic Ocean (off of the Ivory Coast)	18 Women's Army Corps soldiers and three crew members were aboard when the transport went missing en route to Accra after leaving Roberts Field (now Roberts International Airport) in Liberia.
June 15, 1945	Douglas C-47A (81)	3	Unknown	Within China	Disappeared on a CNAC cargo flight between Yunnanyi and Xuzhou (also romanized as Suifu, now known as Yibin).
October 7, 1945	Avro Lancaster (PA278)	25	Mid-air explosion (probable)	North Atlantic Ocean (Mediterranean Sea near Corsica)	Main article: Avro Lancaster PA278 disappearance A second Lancaster flying with PA278 saw an explosion at 04:40 GMT. Both were transporting military personnel.
October 20, 1945	Douglas C-47B (A65-83)	25	Unknown	Indian/Pacific Ocean (Timor Sea)	Main article: 1945 RAAF Douglas C-47 disappearance Flight was transporting wounded military personnel.
October 23, 1945	Douglas Dakota (KJ957)	14	In-flight breakup (presumed)	east of Chiringa, Bangladesh	RAF aircraft disappeared after flying into a thunderstorm at 14,000 feet. Presumed to have broken up in mid-air.
December 5, 1945	TBM Avenger (5 planes)	14	Fuel starvation (presumed)	North Atlantic Ocean (off east coast of Florida)	Main article: Flight 19; Five TBM Avengers carrying 14 people went missing as the result of a presumed navigational error. This was widely covered in the news at the time, and helped to contribute to the Bermuda Triangle myth.
December 5, 1945	Martin PBM-5 Mariner (BuNo 59225)	13	Mid-air explosion (presumed)	North Atlantic Ocean (off east coast of Florida)	This was a search and rescue mission that was looking for the missing TBM Avengers (see above).
February 10, 1946	Röd Niklas (Saab 18, 18180)	3	Weather (presumed)	Sweden (Jämtland)	Military ferry-flight from Halmstad to Kalixfors outside Kiruna which included pilot Håkan Gunnar Hoffberg, aerial scout Karl Einar Carlsson, and signalist Alf Stig Einar Andersson. It is thought the plane may be in a bog in the Swedish province of Jämtland.
March 23, 1946	Avro Lancastrian (G-AGLX)	10	Weather (suspected)	Indian Ocean	Qantas passenger flight with five crew and five passengers missing en route from Negombo to the Cocos, one leg of a flight from the UK to Australia.
May 17, 1946	Douglas C-47B (43-48308)	6	Unknown	India	USAAF aircraft disappeared on a flight from Rangoon to Calcutta, carrying the remains of POWs. At 06:10 the pilot radioed Barrackpore that he had passed Akyab at 05:30, and expected to arrive at Barrackpore at 08:00. Five minutes later, the pilot radioed for weather, which had to be sent twice due to heavy atmospheric interference. At 07:05, the pilot accidentally responded to a call from Barrackpore to another aircraft and said he had nothing for Barrackpore. This was the last contact with the aircraft. On November 5, 2009, Clayton Kuhles of miarecoveries.org claimed to have found the wreckage near Birmani Kami, but when it was investigated in 2013, it turned out to be Convair 240 AP-AEG that had crashed on March 14, 1953. Indian paramilitary Assam Rifles claimed to have found the wreckage in January 2012 and the site was found after a four-month operation, but nothing more was heard of this find.
May 25, 1946	Douglas C-54G (45-489)	5	Unknown	Pacific Ocean (off Guam)	Disappeared between Kwajalein and Guam. A Boeing B-17G (44-83783) sent to search for the C-54 also disappeared.
June 29, 1946	Douglas Dakota IV (KJ918)	18	Weather (presumed)	Malaysia (within Cameron Highlands)	RAF transport from Singapore to Calcutta via Butterworth and Yangon. Shortly after takeoff the pilot reported that he was over the northeastern coast of Thailand, but then decided to return to Butterworth due to bad weather. The pilot radioed 33 minutes later that he was in a "terrible storm" somewhere over the Cameron Highlands.
August 6, 1947	Consolidated PBY-5A Catalina (34032)	20	Unknown	Within Alaska	Disappeared while carrying an Army-Navy football team from Kodiak to Dutch Harbor.
January 30, 1948	Star Tiger (Avro Tudor Mark IV, G-AHNP)	31	Weather (presumed)	North Atlantic Ocean	Main article: BSAA Star Tiger disappearance • Notable missing passengers included Arthur Coningham.
May 5, 1948	Douglas C-47A (NC17645)	3	Unknown	North Atlantic Ocean	Superior Oil Corp. transport flight from Gander to Shannon.
August 1, 1948	Lionel de Marnier (Latécoère 631, F-BDRC)	52	In-flight fire (probable)	North Atlantic Ocean	Main article: Air France Flight 072
October 12, 1948	Ilyushin Il-12 (CCCP-Л1450)	10	Unknown	Azerbaijan (Caucasus Mountains near Yevlakh)	Main article: 1948 Aeroflot Ilyushin Il-12 crash
November 4, 1948	Douglas C-47A-DK (NC66637)	17	Unknown	Pacific Ocean (off of Cape Spencer)	Pacific Alaska Air Express passenger flight from Yakutat to Annette Island. Last communication was received at 05:10 reporting they were at 10,000 feet (3,000 m) and located 235 kilometres (146 mi) SE of Yakutat.
November 8, 1948	Beechcraft C18S (F-BEAF)	8	Weather (probably)	English Channel	Main article: 1948 Beechcraft Model 18 disappearance Flight carrying six Czechoslovak ice hockey players (Zdeněk Jarkovský, Miloslav Pokorný, Karel Stibor, Vilibald Šťovík, Zdeněk Švarc, and Ladislav Troják) from Paris to London has disappeared in adverse weather.
December 28, 1948	Douglas DC-3DST-144 (NC16002)	32	Unknown	North Atlantic Ocean (off east coast of Florida)	Main article: 1948 Airborne Transport DC-3 disappearance
January 17, 1949	Star Ariel (Avro Tudor Mark IVB, G-AGRE)	20	Unknown	North Atlantic Ocean	Main article: BSAA Star Ariel disappearance
August 4, 1949	Unknown (F-....)	0	Unknown	Mauritania (near Port Étienne)	Disappeared on a private flight from Rio de Oro. All 3 occupants found unhurt; unknown if crash site was located.
December 9, 1949	Douglas C-47	8	Unknown	Pacific Ocean (off Baja California)	Local press reported that the aircraft, owned by a fishing company from Ensenada, was carrying 7000 pounds (3175 kg) of live lobsters.
January 26, 1950	Douglas C-54D Skymaster (42-72469)	44	Unknown	Canada (Yukon, near Snag)	Main article: 1950 Douglas C-54D disappearance
June 23, 1950	Douglas DC-4	58	Unknown	United States (Lake Michigan, NW of Benton Harbor)	Main article: Northwest Orient Airlines Flight 2501
March 23, 1951	Douglas C-124 Globemaster II (49-0244)	53	In-flight fire (presumed)	North Atlantic Ocean (near Shannon, Ireland)	Main article: 1951 Atlantic C-124 disappearance • An onboard fire of unknown origin prompted the pilots to ditch. When the USCSC Casco reached the ditching site a day later, the aircraft and its occupants could not be found.
July 21, 1951	Douglas DC-4 (CF-CPC)	37	Icing (probable)	United States (Alaska)	Main article: Canadian Pacific Air Lines Flight 3505
October 15, 1951	Boeing C-97A Stratofreighter (49-2602)	12	Instrument failure (suspected)	North Atlantic	USAF aircraft took off from Rhein-Main AFB at 08:36 UTC on October 14 and flew directly to Lajes AFB, landing there at 16:03 UTC. After being refueled, the C-97 took off again at 18:51 UTC. Due to failure of the Loran set, two radio compasses and radio altimeter, the crew returned to Lajes AFB, landing at 20:19 UTC. The crew stayed overnight and took off the next morning at 08:43 UTC, but the aircraft never made it to its destination of Westover AFB and was declared missing.
November 15, 1952	Fairchild C-119 Flying Boxcar (51-2570)	20	Unknown: aircraft presumably went off course following radio issues	United States (Alaska)	United States Air Force aircraft reported missing during a flight from Coast Guard Base Kodiak to Elmendorf Air Force Base.
February 2, 1953	Avro York (G-AHFA)	39	Unknown	North Atlantic Ocean	Main article: 1953 Skyways Avro York disappearance
April 1, 1953	Miles M.38 Messenger 2A (G-AKBL)	2	Unknown	North Atlantic Ocean (Irish Sea)	Private flight piloted by Rodney R. Matthews-Naper with passenger Walter Bradley. Possible debris from their plane was sighted from the air, west of Isle of Man.
November 23, 1953	F-89C Scorpion (51-5853A)	2	Unknown	Canada (Lake Superior)	Fighter jet piloted by Felix Moncla that was deployed to intercept an unusual object that had been detected via radar. Moncla and the radar operator Robert L. Wilson were lost. While theories range from vertigo to an encounter with a UFO, no trace of the aircraft has ever been found. There is a memorial to Moncla at Sacred Heart Cemetery in Moreauville, Louisiana.
October 30, 1954	Lockheed R7V-1 Constellation (128441)	42	Unknown	North Atlantic Ocean (off east coast of Maryland)	United States Navy Flight 57, disappeared off Maryland with 42 passengers and crew.
January 11, 1955	Avro Shackletons (WG531 and WL743)	18	Mid-air collision (probable)	Atlantic Ocean	Main article: 1955 RAF Shackleton aircraft disappearance The two aircraft probably collided in mid-air after being launched within six minutes of each other. An engine from WL743 was found by a trawler in July 1966, some 120 km north of the original search area.
September 26, 1955	Lockheed P2V-3W Neptune (131442)	11	Weather (probable)	Caribbean Sea (off Jamaica)	US Navy aircraft took off from NAS Guantanamo to investigate Hurricane Janet, then a category 4 hurricane south of Jamaica. The aircraft penetrated the hurricane's eyewall at 700 feet (215 m), then all contact was lost. No wreckage has been found.
January 31, 1956	North American B-25J Mitchell (44-29125)	2	Fuel starvation	United States (Monongahela River, Pennsylvania)	The aircraft ditched in the Monongahela River due to fuel starvation while transporting military personnel. Both crew members were lost, and the airframe has never been found.
March 10, 1956	Boeing B-47 Stratojet (SN:52-534)	3	Unknown	North Atlantic Ocean (Mediterranean Sea)	Main article: 1956 B-47 disappearance • Nuclear weapons material lost in incident.
April 22, 1956	McDonnell F2H-3 Banshee (126330)	1	Unknown	North Atlantic Ocean (off Yarmouth, Nova Scotia)	Inexplicably dropped out of formation and descended through clouds during a Royal Canadian Navy (RCN) ferry flight. No trace of the aircraft or pilot was ever found despite an extensive RCN and US Navy search effort.
October 10, 1956	Douglas R6D-1 Liftmaster	59	Unknown	North Atlantic Ocean (near Land's End, United Kingdom)	Main article: 1956 Atlantic R6D-1 disappearance A 14-day search for the aircraft and survivors found only wheels and a life raft floating 596 miles (959 km) southwest of Land's End.
December 1, 1956	SNCASE Languedoc (61/F-SSUN)	10	Unknown	Mediterranean Sea	French Air Force aircraft, of EARS 99 (the SAR unit of the French Air Force), took off from Istres Air Base to assist a Panamanian cargo ship, the Antares, which had sent a distress signal. The aircraft circled the area of the Mediterranean Sea in poor weather. At 23:56, the pilot radioed his position to be 41°44'N, 005°06'E with an estimated return to Istres of 00:50. Nothing more was heard from the flight.
March 22, 1957	Boeing C-97C Stratofreighter (50-0702)	67	Unknown	North Pacific Ocean (near Tokyo, Japan)	Main article: 1957 Pacific Ocean Boeing C-97 disappearance Military transport carrying 10 crew and 57 passengers went missing.
November 8, 1957	Boeing 377 Stratocruiser 10-29	44	Unknown	Central Pacific Ocean	Main article: Pan Am Flight 7 Last contact with the aircraft was a routine radio transmission between the pilot and a US Coast Guard cutter performing radar surveillance duty at Ocean Station November, located at the approximate halfway point between the mainland and the island of Oahu.
January 19, 1958	Boeing C-97A Stratofreighter (49-2597)	7	Unknown	Pacific Ocean (off Honolulu)	7 crew missing; debris found 277 mi southwest of Honolulu was confirmed to be from the aircraft.
February 20, 1958	Lockheed WV-2 Super Constellation (141310)	22	Unknown	North Atlantic Ocean (near Azores)	Military (airborne radar patrol) flight.
September 29, 1958	Avro 685 York I (OD-ADB)	5	Unknown	North Atlantic Ocean (Mediterranean Sea)	An MEA cargo flight disappeared en route from Beirut to London before a stopover in Rome.
November 8, 1958	Douglas DC-3 (TAM-05)	3	Unknown	Bolivia (near La Paz)	Cargo plane operated by Transporte Aéreo Militar.
November 9, 1958	Martin PBM-5 Mariner (CS-THB)	36	Unknown	North Atlantic Ocean (near Portugal)	Aero-Topográfica (ARTOP) flight from Lisbon to Funchal, piloted by Harry Frank Broadbent. The flight departing at 12:23 and the last radio transmission, received at 13:21, was "QUG", meaning "I am forced to land immediately."
October 28, 1959	Cessna 310 (FAR-53)	3	Unknown	North Atlantic Ocean (Gulf of Mexico)	Private flight piloted by Camilo Cienfuegos.

=== 1960–1979 ===
Date	Aircraft	People missing	Type of incident	Location (assumed)	Remarks
July 10, 1960	Douglas C-47 (VT-DGS)	16	Unknown	Indian Ocean (Persian Gulf, near Sharjah, UAE)	This Gulf Aviation flight from Doha made up of 3 crew, and 13 passengers either crashed at sea or overflew its destination (Sharjah) causing CFIT.
February 3, 1961	Douglas C-47A	26	Unknown	Central Pacific Ocean (near Madura Island, Indonesia)	Main article: Garuda Indonesian Airways Flight 542; 5 crew and 21 passengers were reported missing.
February 18, 1961	North American FJ-4 Fury	1	Unknown	North Pacific Ocean (near the Philippines)	1 crew was reported missing “sortied” from USS Lexington (CV-16).
March 8, 1961	Piaggio P.166 (VH-PAU)	1	Weather	Papua New Guinea (Owen Stanley Range)	Papuan Air Transport (Patair) flight from Popondetta to Port Moresby piloted by Geoffrey Neil Wallace, 25. Last contact 10 minutes from arrival over Kokoda with a report of bad weather. A 17-day search with up to 30 aircraft found nothing; anecdotal reports of wreckage discovery in October 1970 unconfirmed.
November 11, 1961	Lockheed; L-749A Constellation (HH-ABA)	3	Unknown	North Atlantic Ocean (Caribbean Sea E of Puerto Rico)	This was a cargo flight, operated by Air Haiti International from San Juan to Managua.
February 12, 1962	De Havilland Dragonfly (ZK-AFB)	5	Unknown	New Zealand (Milford Sound)	The first of five aircraft to have disappeared in the area.
March 16, 1962	Lockheed; L-1049H Constellation	107	Mid-air explosion (presumed)	North Pacific Ocean (near Guam)	Main article: Flying Tiger Line Flight 739; Military transport.
January 2, 1964	Douglas C-124 Globemaster II (52-0968)	9	Unknown	North Pacific Ocean	One passenger was lost in this military transport flight.
March 28, 1964	Douglas C-54A Skymaster (N4726V)	9	Engine fire (presumed)	North Pacific Ocean	The aircraft involved had previously been used in the movie The High and the Mighty (1954).
August 12, 1964	Cessna 210A (N9492X)	1 (Charles Clifford Ogle)	Unknown	United States (Sierra Nevada, California)	Private flight.
October 18, 1965	Boeing 307B-1 Stratoliner (F-BELV)	13	Shot down (presumed)	North Pacific Ocean (near Hanoi)	On board were four crew members, and nine international delegation members of the ICSC. A study done in 1996 concluded that the aircraft was most likely shot down by a North Vietnamese military unit.
June 5, 1965	Fairchild C-119F Flying Boxcar (51-2680)	9	Unknown	North Atlantic Ocean (near the Bahamas)	Four of those lost were mechanics being transported to Grand Turk Island to repair a C-119. Debris from the aircraft was found on 19 July on the beach of Gold Rock Cay just off the shore of Acklins Island.
November 3, 1965	Douglas C-54	68	Engine fire	Costa Rica (Cordillera de Talamanca)	Main article: 1965 Argentine Air Force C-54 disappearance 25 lifebuoys, personal belongings and some wreckage were found in Bocas del Toro Archipelago, but the airplane or bodies were never recovered.
July 11, 1966	Curtiss C-46D Commando (HK-527)	8	Unknown	Near Cerro el Planchon, Chile en route from Bogota, Colombia to Buenos Aires, Argentina	This was a cargo flight. Wreckage was found on 18 November 1966 some 200 km (120 mi) south of Santiago.
July 23, 1966	Douglas DC-3 (HS-OOO)	3	Unknown	Pacific Ocean 840 km off the US coast	Missing on a delivery flight to the Thai Government. The crew radioed a passing airliner that an engine had failed and that they were returning to San Francisco.
March 5, 1967	Grumman HU-16E Albatross (1240)	6	Unknown	Gulf of Mexico (off of Florida)	Rescue flight responding to a fishing boat distress signal near the Carrabelle sea buoy.
October 16, 1967	Cessna 150	2	Unknown	Near Holmö, off the cost of Sweden, en route from Vaasa,Finland to Umeå, Sweden	
June 5, 1968	Lockheed A-12 (A-12 Aircraft No. 129)	1	Unknown	Philippine Sea, on a flight from Kadena Air Base, Okinawa	This was an engine replacement check flight. Lost: CIA pilot Jack W. Weeks. Scheduled as last operational A-12 flight from Kadena.
March 9, 1969	Douglas DC-4 (N3821)	3	Unknown	N Atlantic en route from Halifax International Airport to Santa Maria Airport (Azores)	This was a cargo flight.
June 5, 1969	Rivet Amber (Boeing RC-135)	19	Unknown	Bering Sea en route from Shemya AFB, AK to Eielson AFB, AK, ca 400 km E of Shemya	Flight to maintenance facility.
September 21, 1970	Free Life (Rozière balloon, N2079)	3	Weather (presumed)	N Atlantic approx 1000 km SE of Newfoundland	Attempted transatlantic flight (first by balloon).
January 3, 1971	Cessna 172 (N8342L)	2	Weather (presumed)	Lake Michigan (presumed) en route to Holland, Michigan	A snowstorm hit the day of the flight, pilot reported four hours of fuel left. No sign of the plane or occupants has ever been found.
June 13, 1971	Boeing EC-135N (61-0331)	24	Unknown	Pacific Ocean, 113 km S of Hawaii, near Palmyra Atoll en route from Pago Pago to Hickam Air Force Base	Military observation flight returning from French nuclear test Encelade.
February 11, 1972	Douglas C-54A-DO (XW-TDE)	23	Shot down	Laos (between Savannakhet and Vientiane)	Royal Air Lao passenger flight. Last radio contact at 13:20.
May 26, 1972	Lockheed P-3A Orion (152155)	8	Unknown	Pacific Ocean off California, on a routine training mission based at Moffett Federal Airfield	Military training flight.
July 20, 1972	Canadair CC-106 Yukon (LV-JYR)	5	Unknown	En route from Carrasco International Airport, Montevideo, Uruguay to Santiago, Chile	Cargo flight
October 16, 1972	Cessna 310C (N1812H)	4	Unknown	Alaska en route from Anchorage to Juneau	Among the passengers on this flight were Nick Begich and Hale Boggs; both were serving U.S. Representatives.
January 10, 1974	Douglas DC-4 (TAM-52)	24	Unknown	Central Bolivia en route from Santa Rosa de Yacuma Airport (SRB/SLSR) (14°3′58″S 66°47′12″W) to El Alto International Airport, La Paz	Operated by Transporte Aéreo Militar.
February 16, 1974	Beech 95/B55 Baron (VH-FWR)	2	Unknown	Queensland en route from Gladstone to Longreach	
February 21, 1974	Light Heart (superpressure balloon)	1 (Thomas Leigh Gatch, Jr.)	Unknown	1610km W of the Canaries en route from Harrisburg Airport, PA to W Europe	Attempted transatlantic flight (first by balloon). The last radio contact with Gatch saying that he was 1,490 km NE of San Juan, PR on February 19 is disputed.
June 24, 1974	Beechcraft Bonanza V35A (OH-BBD)	6	Unknown	in the vicinity of Bodø, Norway	The flight took off from Ivalo,Finland heading to Bodø, Norway.The plane was carrying a Sami delegation for a visit to Norway. Main article: Bodø 1974 airplane crash
October 12, 1974	Swan 38 (Lockheed WC-130, 65–0965)	6	Weather	South China Sea	Weather reconnaissance aircraft lost during Typhoon Bess (1974).
September 30, 1975	Tupolev Tu-154 (HA-LCI)	60	Unknown	Mediterranean Sea, close to Beirut–Rafic Hariri International Airport	Main article: Malév Flight 240
December 24, 1975	Cessna F150H	0 (pilot's body recovered)	Unknown	North Atlantic, near the Isle of Mull, Scotland	Main article: Great Mull Air Mystery
September 24, 1976	Curtiss C-46D Commando (HK-1282)	2	Unknown	Caribbean Sea off Aruba en route to Queen Beatrix International Airport	This was a cargo flight that might have been lost on September 16 rather than the 24th.
November 5, 1976	Douglas DC-3 (HP-671)	2	Unknown	Caribbean Sea en route from Willemstad, Curaçao to Port-au-Prince, Haiti	Cargo flight.
June 30, 1977	Lockheed L-188CF Electra (N126US)	4	Unknown	Caribbean Sea 65 km off Bocas del Toro, Panama en route from San José, Costa Rica to Caracas, Venezuela	One passenger, and three crew members were lost on this cargo flight.
August 16, 1978	Cessna 180 ZK-BMP	4	Unknown	Lake McKerrow, New Zealand	The aircraft was last seen departing Big Bay and flying about the coastline in marginal weather conditions.
September 21, 1978	Douglas DC-3 (N407D)	4	Unknown	N Atlantic off Ft Lauderdale, FL en route from Ft Lauderdale to Havana, Cuba	Aircraft flying to pick up passengers in Havana.
October 21, 1978	Cessna 182L (VH-DSJ)	1 (Frederick Valentich)	Unknown	Bass Strait, vicinity of Cape Otway, Victoria, Australia (as reported by pilot)	No radar confirmation of the pilot-reported position. Theories of the disappearance range from the pilot being deceived by the illusion of a tilted horizon, to a UFO encounter as shown on Unsolved Mysteries.
October 22, 1978	Britten-Norman BN-2A Islander (H4-AAC)	11	Fuel starvation	Pacific Ocean near Bellona, Solomon Islands	Lost during a Solomon Airlines flight from Bellona to Honiara when the pilot turned back due to weather and became disoriented. Plane ditched while still in radio contact but not recovered.
December 23, 1978	Cessna 185	4	Unknown	Between Red Deer airport and Kamloops, B.C.	Two passengers survived the crash for at least two days, communicating via radio. Searchers were unable to find the plane and communication stopped.
December 29, 1978	Piper Cherokee Six ZK-EBU	7	Unknown	Milford Sound, New Zealand	Piloted by Edward Morrison (28) and carrying six passengers, the aircraft disappeared while on a scenic flight from Taieri, Dunedin, to Queenstown, Milford Sound, Preservation Inlet, then return to Dunedin.
January 30, 1979	Boeing 707-323C	6	Unknown	Pacific Ocean 200 km ENE of Tokyo	Main article: Varig Flight 967; Cargo flight which carried 53 of Manabu Mabe's paintings which were lost.
July 7, 1979	Socata Rallye 235GT (N302RA)	3	Unknown	Vicinity of Woody Island (Alaska) en route from Anchorage to Kodiak	Among the missing is Ian Mackintosh.
July 20, 1979	Douglas C-47B-50-DK (N63250)	2	Ditching	Pacific Ocean, near Honolulu	Trans National Airlines ferry flight that became lost and was forced to ditch due to LORAN failure.

=== 1980–1999 ===
Date	Aircraft	People missing	Type of incident	Location (assumed)	Remarks
May 13, 1980	Britten-Norman BN-2A-6 Islander (PT-KHK)	7	Unknown	Brazil (between Rio de Janeiro, RJ and São Paulo, SP)	Conducting survey mission. Despite 19 days of search, no trace of the aircraft was found.
June 28, 1980	ERCO Ercoupe 415-D (N3808H)	2	Unknown	Mona Channel, Puerto Rico	From Las Américas Intnl Airport, Dominican Republic, to San Juan, Puerto Rico
September 7, 1980	Beechcraft 80 Queen Air (N242Q)	1	Unknown	Florida (Lake Marian)	Plane crashed into lake near Kenansville in what was likely an illegal smuggling flight. The wreckage and pilot, Mark Elliott, could not be found.
October 3, 1980	Douglas DC-3 (C-47A) (ECT-025)	2	Unknown	North Atlantic Ocean (Mediterranean Sea)	This aircraft had been previously decommissioned with a provisional and limited airworthiness certificate. The intention was to eventually ferry this aircraft to an aviation museum, but this was cut short by an unauthorized take off. The runway used was unrated (possibly damaging), and the plane had no working radio equipment.
April 21, 1981	Douglas C-53 Skytrooper (F-BJBY)	4	Unknown	North Atlantic Ocean (Mediterranean Sea off Port d'Andratx)	
August 9, 1981	Cessna 210M (VH-MDX)	5	Instrument failure (presumed)	Australia (Barrington Tops National Park)	Main article: 1981 Barrington Tops Cessna 210 disappearance
April 29, 1982	Cessna 185 (572811)	5	Unknown	Canada (between Fox Creek and Prince George, B.C.)	Despite extensive searches over 40 years, no trace of the orange and white plane has been found.
February 13, 1983	Learjet 35A (N482U)	6 (including Upali Wijewardene)	Unknown	Indian/Pacific Ocean (Strait of Malacca)	Operated by Upali Air. On February 19, a survival pack was found that was apparently from the aircraft.
July 30, 1983	Cessna 172K (ZK-CSS)	4	Unknown	New Zealand (Lake Tekapo)	The Turner family disappeared while attempting to cross the Southern Alps with a cold front approaching.
September 2, 1983	Britten-Norman BN-2A-21 Islander (C-GIPF)	7	Unknown	Canada (British Columbia near Smithers)	Notable lost passengers include George Cogar.
March 31, 1984	Cessna 402 (N44NC)	6	Unknown	North Atlantic Ocean (Straits of Florida)	Associated Air Service flight from Fort Lauderdale to Bimini. Disappeared from radar 14 minutes after departure in a 5,400 FPM descent. Two witnesses saw plane go down near Bimini between 08:30 and 09:00.
October 31, 1984	Douglas C-47B-1-DL (RP-C138)	4	Unknown	North Pacific Ocean (off Davao, Philippines)	Cargo flight en route from Davao to Manila.
September 16, 1985	Pitts S-2 (N13AS)	1 (Art Scholl)	Flat spin	North Pacific Ocean (off Carlsbad, United States)	Accident occurred during filming for Top Gun (1986). The aircraft involved entered into a fatal flat spin, but the cause was never determined.
March 25, 1986	Antonov An-32 (K2729)	7	Unknown	Indian Ocean (off Jamnagar, India)	Main article: 1986 Indian Air Force Antonov An-32 disappearance Delivery flight operated by Indian Air Force.
August 3, 1986	de Havilland Canada DHC-6 Twin Otter	13	Weather (storm loss)	North Atlantic Ocean (Caribbean Sea)	Main article: LIAT Flight 319; Operated by LIAT.
May 27, 1987	Cessna 402 (N2652B)	1	Unknown	North Atlantic Ocean (within The Bahamas)	56-year-old Richard Yerex, a commuter pilot for the Ford Motor Company and a retired Air Force pilot, left Palm Beach at 8:05, headed to Marsh Harbor to pick up tourists on a return flight. He sent his last transmission over Grand Bahama Island near a weather balloon. He failed to arrive at 8:50 and the Coast Guard launched a search 25 minutes later; the 2 day search failed to find any trace of the aircraft.
December 4, 1987	Britten-Norman BN-2A-6 Islander (C-GOMC)	4	Unknown	Canada (British Columbia near Mount Waddington)	
December 23, 1987	Piper PA-31-350 Navajo Chieftain (N712AN)	8	Unknown	Hawaii (Molokai, 21 km NW of Mauna Loa)	Panorama Air Tour flight from Honolulu to Molokai. Was to fly across 35 km (22-mile) channel on an overcast night with no moon. Plane slowed from 170 to 95 knots (315 to 176 km/h), gained 500 feet (150 m) altitude, and turned left 190 degrees before disappearing from radar at 18:53. Pilot had not flown IFR for 15 months and only flew during the day.
January 17, 1989	Douglas C-47A Skytrain (CP-1418)	5	Unknown	Bolivia (near La Paz)	
August 25, 1989	Fokker F27 Friendship	54	Unknown	Pakistan (Himalayan mountain range)	Main article: Pakistan International Airlines Flight 404; Probably crashed into the Himalayan mountains, no wreckage was ever found.
May 17, 1990	Cessna 150H (N7156S)	2	Loss of control (presumed)	North Pacific Ocean (off Santa Barbara, United States)	Disappeared during night touch-and-go landing practice at nearby Santa Barbara Municipal Airport. The aircraft's wheel chocks and a few other items were recovered. Officially attributed to loss of control and the pilot's lack of night flying experience.
August 16, 1990	Convair CV-240 (HI-376CT)	2	In-flight breakup (probable)	Caribbean Sea (off Mayagüez, San Juan)	Disappeared during a cargo flight between San Juan and Santo Domingo. The pilot of an aircraft in the area reported hearing an emergency radio call and stated that he observed the aircraft descending out of control after losing parts from the tail area. No wreckage was found despite an extensive search operation. The aircraft probably broke up in mid-air due to structural failure as the result of a botched cargo door conversion.
September 11, 1990	Boeing 727 (OB-1303)	16	Fuel starvation (presumed)	North Atlantic Ocean (off Cape Race, Canada)	Main article: 1990 Faucett Perú Boeing 727 disappearance On September 11, 1990, a Faucett Boeing 727 went missing some 290 km (180 miles) southeast of Cape Race, Newfoundland. After having been leased to Air Malta, the aircraft was being returned to Peru from Europe via Iceland, when the crew reported a low fuel notice and that they were preparing to ditch. There were no survivors among 16 occupants on board.
October 25, 1991	Britten-Norman BN-2A Trislander Mk. III-2 (PK-KTC)	17	Unknown	Tumbang Miri, Indonesia	Lost during a Bali International Air Service flight from Palangka Raya to Sampit. Was holding in the Sampit area due to weather but failed to land.
May 3, 1992	Cessna 340 (N69469)	5	Unknown	Alaska (near Yakutat)	Private flight piloted by Jeffery H. Roth from Yakutat to Anchorage. Pilot reported reaching assigned altitude (12,000 feet/3660 m) and all communications were lost. Roth's wife, however, listened to the FAA tapes herself and claimed she heard her husband say "6,000" and "icing conditions" several minutes after this point, but FBI analysis could not confirm this.
December 6, 1992	Piper PA-28-181 (N81453)	4	Unknown	California (between Santa Barbara and Palo Alto)	Despite a warning that VFR flight would not be suitable due to weather conditions, the pilot left anyway. Cleared for takeoff at 12:03 and last heard from 11 minutes later. Searches turned up no trace of the aircraft; a tip claimed the plane had gone down in the Big Basin area but nothing was found there either.
March 15, 1993	Piper Cherokee Arrow (N15206)	1	Unknown	Michigan (presumed Lake Michigan)	Plane disappeared 83 minutes into the flight from Toledo Suburban airport, north of Grand Rapids. No evidence of a crash, plane or pilot has ever been found.
November 21, 1993	Cessna 172I (N35549)	1	Unknown	Michigan (presumed Lake Michigan)	Lost enroute from Kalamazoo, Michigan to Milwaukee, Wisconsin.
October 2, 1994	Aero Commander 690	9	Loss of control	Tasman Sea (260 km NE Williamtown)	En route from Williamtown to Lord Howe Island. A small amount of aircraft debris was found floating on the sea surface, but the aircraft itself was never located.
January 10, 1995	de Havilland Canada DHC-6 Twin Otter	14	Weather (presumed)	Indian Ocean (Savu Sea)	Main article: Merpati Nusantara Airlines Flight 6715 en route from Bima Airport to Satartacik Airport, Ruteng. Disappeared in bad weather.
March 9, 1996	de Havilland Canada DHC-6 Twin Otter (N245GW)	3	Weather, fuel exhaustion (presumed)	Peru (Amazonas Region)	Carson Helicopters flight departed Bagua, where visual meteorological conditions prevailed, on an aerial geological survey near the Cenepa River, in Peru's dense Amazon region jungle near the disputed border with Ecuador. Did not return to Bagua and no communications were sent by the plane. SAR operations were unsuccessful. May had run out of fuel as bad weather en route reportedly altered the planned course, leading to the aircraft's fuel becoming critical. No flight plan was filed. The occupants were the American pilot-in-command, an American survey operator, and a Peruvian Air Force observer.
May 10, 1996	Cessna 404 Titan (C-FPVB)	4	Unknown	Peru (Andes Mountains)	Aerodat charter flight from Pucallpa to Cuzco. All three passengers were Canadians on an oil exploration trip.
November 8, 1997	Cessna 180 (ZK-FMQ)	1	Unknown	New Zealand (Waiatoto River)	23-year-old pilot Ryan Moynihan disappeared after departing West Melton Aerodrome for Waiatoto on a routine cargo flight.
December 22, 1997	Antonov An-72 (ER-ACF)	5	Shot down (possible)	South Atlantic Ocean	Main article: 1997 Renan Antonov An-72 disappearance Cargo flight en route from Port Bouet Airport, Côte d'Ivoire to Rundu Airport, Namibia. Possibly shot down by Angolan Air Force.
July 3, 1998	Aero L-39 Albatross	2	Unknown	Northern Michigan	Pilot and co-pilot went missing from radar while doing a preparation flight before the National Cherry Festival Air Show. Despite a search area of 1,900 square miles (4,900 km^{2}), no evidence of the plane or pilots has ever been found.

== 21st century ==
=== 2000–2019 ===
Date	Aircraft	People missing	Type of incident	Location (assumed)	Remarks
January 7, 2000	Antonov An-26 (D2-FBR)	8	Unknown	Angola	Cargo flight from Luanda to Cafunfo, operator unknown. Disappeared in the Malanje-Lunda Norte border area.
May 25, 2003	Boeing 727-223 (N844AA)	2+ (Ben C. Padilla & John M. Mutantu)	Theft (presumed)	Unknown	Main article: 2003 Angola Boeing 727 disappearance Stolen at Quatro de Fevereiro Airport, it is unclear how many people were aboard.
October 16, 2008	GippsAero GA8 Airvan (VH-WRT)	1	Unknown	Australia (Buckingham Bay, Northern Territory)	Arnhem Land Community Airlines cargo flight from and to Elcho Island with stops in Mata Mata, Muthamul, Nyinyikay, and Rurruwuy. Plane noticed missing at 12:30. Witness spotted plane followed by black smoke rising from eastern Napier Peninsula. Some wreckage found in southwestern Buckingham Bay on October 17; main wreckage and pilot missing.
November 1, 2008	Beechcraft King Air 65-A90-1 (N87V)	3	Unknown	Guyana (Near Georgetown)	Lost: 3 crew. Aircraft vanished over a remote part of the Guyana jungle.
December 15, 2008	Britten-Norman BN-2A Trislander Mk.III-2 (N650LP)	12	Unknown	Atlantic Ocean (Caribbean Sea off Turks and Caicos)	Línea Aérea Puertorriqueña (LAP) passenger flight from Santiago de los Caballeros to Mayaguana. Pilot contacted Providenciales ATC at 17:06 reporting an emergency. The pilot's license had been suspended in October 2006.
May 21, 2010	Beechcraft 200 Super King Air (D2-FFT)	3	Unknown	Angola (near Caxito)	Grupo Chicoil aircraft on a flight from Pointe Noire to Luanda, chartered by Dubai-based businessman Rachid Mustapha. Contact was lost in the Caxito area at 00:20; no sign of the aircraft has been found.
June 10, 2010	Cessna 208B Grand Caravan (OB-1922-P)	0	Hijacking and theft	Unknown	45-minute Aerodiana sightseeing flight of the Nazca Lines, departing 07:10, with 9 occupants (2 crew, 7 passengers). A number of passengers used false identities. Pilot and copilot were released 21 days later but the plane was never returned nor found.
January 2, 2011	Robinson R44 (LV-ZYO)	1 (Alejandro Ferzola)	Unknown	Argentina	En route from Brandsen to Santa Teresita, Argentina.
March 28, 2011	Cessna 550 Citation II (B-7026)	3	Unknown	China (Tianshan Mountains)	Survey flight by Zhong Fei General Aviation Company out of Korla, departing at 16:00.
June 8, 2012	Piper PA-31-310 Navajo (N174BH)	1	Unknown	Lake Superior (near Two Harbors)	Plane owned by Family Celebrations, on a maintenance test flight out of South Saint Paul. Plane was following along western shoreline of lake, 0.5 miles (800 m) from shore. Last recorded position 30 miles (48 km) NE of Duluth at 1,600 feet (490 m) at 14:27. Search suspended on July 4, 2012.
April 7, 2013	Beechcraft 1900C (ZS-PHL)	1 (Jerry Krause)	Unknown	North Atlantic Ocean (Near São Tomé International Airport)	Private flight.
March 8, 2014	Boeing 777-200ER (9M-MRO)	239	Unknown	Indian Ocean	Main article: Malaysia Airlines Flight 370; Most evidence suggests that the plane went down in the Indian Ocean west of Australia. While some debris was later recovered, the plane is still marked as missing.
December 28, 2014	Britten-Norman BN-2 Islander (8R-GHE)	2	Unknown	Guyana	Cargo flight en route from Mahdia, Guyana to Karisparu, Guyana that failed to arrive at destination. Despite a 21-day search effort, no trace was found.
September 5, 2015	British Aerospace 125 air ambulance (6V-AIM)	7	Hypoxia (presumed)	Atlantic Ocean (off Dakar, Senegal)	Collided with a CEIBA Intercontinental Boeing 737 near Tambacounda, Senegal, flew westerly for about an hour without making any radio calls, then disappeared. Investigators believe that the 737's winglet struck 6V-AIM's fuselage, resulting in uncontrolled decompression which incapacitated everyone on board; 6V-AIM then flew until it ran out of fuel and crashed into the ocean. No trace of 6V-AIM or its 7 occupants was ever found. The 737 landed safely.
December 30, 2016	Cessna 172M Skyhawk (N174LL)	3	Disappeared in bad weather conditions	Pacific Ocean (off Molokai, Hawaii, United States)	The aircraft was on a flight to Honolulu Airport. Shortly after take off the aircraft turned northwest toward an area with adverse weather. Radar data showed a descent before the disappearance.
June 8, 2017	PA-28-161 Warrior II (C-GDTK)	2	Unknown	British Columbia	Disappeared in the British Columbia Interior. En route from Cranbrook, British Columbia, to Kamloops, British Columbia.
November 23, 2018	British Aerospace 125-700A (N422X)	Unknown	Unknown	Caribbean Sea, off the coast of Curaçao	Disappeared while flying from La Romana International Airport, Dominican Republic, to La Chinita International Airport, Venezuela.
December 2, 2018	Embraer EMB 720C Minuano (PT-RDZ)	8	Unknown	Brazil (Amazon rainforest)	Disappeared during a flight from Matawaré, an isolated village in Brazil's Tumucumaque Mountains National Park, to Laranjal do Jari, a mining town in the state of Amapá. Contact was lost after the pilot reported losing a cylinder. A two-week search by the Brazilian Air Force and a weeks-long search by relatives of those on board failed to find any trace of the plane.
February 1, 2019	Piper PA-32R (N41453)	1	Unknown	North Atlantic Ocean (E. of Palm Beach, Florida, US)	Disappeared en route from Lantana airport in Palm Beach to the Bahamas. A 24 hour search failed to turn up any trace of the plane or any debris. On April 8, 2019, the body of the pilot washed up on the Bahamas coast, but the aircraft and the passenger remain unaccounted for.
April 9, 2019	F-35A (JASDF 79-8705)	1	Unknown	North Pacific Ocean (Near Aomori Prefecture, Japan)	Some small pieces of the aircraft's tail were found, but the plane is still marked as missing. Contact was lost about 135 kilometers east of Misawa Air Base.
September 13, 2019	MBB Bo 105	3	Unknown	Russia (Yakutia Region, Lake Ayama)	Missing en route.

=== 2020–present ===
Date	Aircraft	People missing	Type of incident	Location (assumed)	Remarks
January 23, 2020	Piper PA-34-220T Seneca V (YV2604)	3	Unknown	near Charallave, Miranda State, Venezuela	The aircraft went missing on a flight from Óscar Machado Zuloaga International Airport to Higuerote Airport. After four months of search the plane was still not found.
April 2, 2022	Piper PA-28R-200-2 (G-EGVA)	2	Weather (Lost in "highly convective clouds")	English Channel, approximately 20 nmi (37 km) west of Le Touquet	G-EGVA was one of seven aircraft flying from Wellesbourne Mountford Aerodrome to Le Touquet in France. As they approached the middle of the English Channel, the aircraft reported that they were in the clouds. The flight was operating under visual flight rules and neither pilot was qualified to fly in cloudy conditions. Shortly after transmission report, the plane disappeared from radar and has never been found, despite extensive searches by both UK and French authorities.
September 1, 2024	Bellanca 17-30A Super Viking 300A (PP-ICO)	1	Unknown	Over Venezuela	PP-ICO was conducting a ferry flight from Caicara del Orinoco Airport, in central Venezuela. The aircraft belonged to a Brazilian businessman.
April 29, 2025	Air Tractor AT-802A Fire Boss (N4025K)	1	Aircraft disappeared during a ferry flight	Atlantic Ocean, about 120 nautical miles east of St. John's, Canada	N4025K was scheduled to perform a transatlantic ferry flight from St. John's International Airport, Canada, to Santa Maria Airport in the Azores, Portugal. Search teams found some small parts of the plane, an empty raft and an oil slick.
July 13, 2025	Cessna 400 (N636CS)	1	Aircraft disappeared en route	Pacific Ocean, about 470 miles off San Diego, California, United States	N636CS was presumed destroyed while en route from Ramona Airport to Montgomery-Gibbs Executive Airport after it kept flying west at an altitude of 2,600 ft after being cleared for landing before crashing into the Pacific Ocean. At least one person was on board. The pilot was flying the plane owned by renowned chemist and CEO of Scripps Research Peter G. Schultz. The National Transportation Safety Board said it was investigating the crash.
August 3, 2025	BRM Aero Bristell Classic S-LSA (23-2180)	2	Aircraft disappeared en route	Bass Strait	The aircraft went missing over the Bass Strait while flying from Tasmania to Victoria. After days of search the aircraft has not been found, and the two occupants are presumed dead.
