= Émile Barrière =

French aviator

- Born: Émile Barrière; 15 February 1902; Toulouse
- Died: 10 February 1936 (aged 33); Vicinity of Saint Peter and Saint Paul Archipelago, South Atlantic
- Cause of death: Aviation accident (presumed)
- Known for: Aviation engineer and one of the pioneers of commercial aviation in South America
- Awards: L'ordre de la Nation (25 February 1936) Légion d'honneur (10 April 1936)
- Aviation career
- First flight: 1932
- Flight license: 1933

Émile Barrière (15 February 1902 — 10 February 1936) was an early twentieth-century French aviator, who played a major role in the early development of commercial aviation in South America, rising to be director of Air France's South American network at the age of 31.

== Disappearance ==
In February 1936, Barrière was a passenger on an Air France Latécoère 301 Ville de Buenos Aires which disappeared en route from Natal, Brazil to Dakar, French West Africa. After a radio message from the vicinity of Saint Peter and Saint Paul Archipelago reporting that the flying boat was flying in rain at an altitude of 300m, nothing more was ever heard of the aircraft.

== See also ==
- List of people who disappeared mysteriously at sea
