= Disappearance of Alejandro Bello =

Chilean aviator

Alejandro Bello Silva
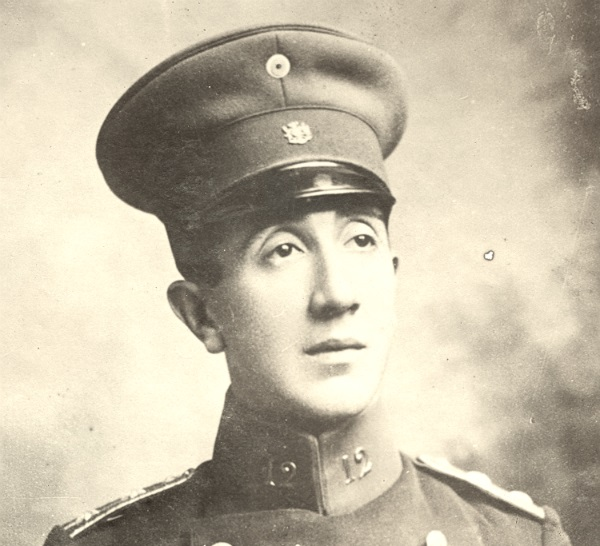
- 2nd Lt. Alejandro Bello Silva
- Born: Luis Alejandro Bello Silva; 27 April 1889; Santiago, Chile
- Disappeared: c. 9 March 1914 (aged 24)
- Military career
- Allegiance: Chile
- Branch: Chilean Army
- Service years: 1909–1914
- Rank: First Lieutenant

First Lieutenant Luis Alejandro Bello Silva (27 April 1889 – c. 9 March 1914) was a Chilean aviator who disappeared during his qualifying flight for certification as a military pilot somewhere between Culitrín and Cartagena.

== Biography ==
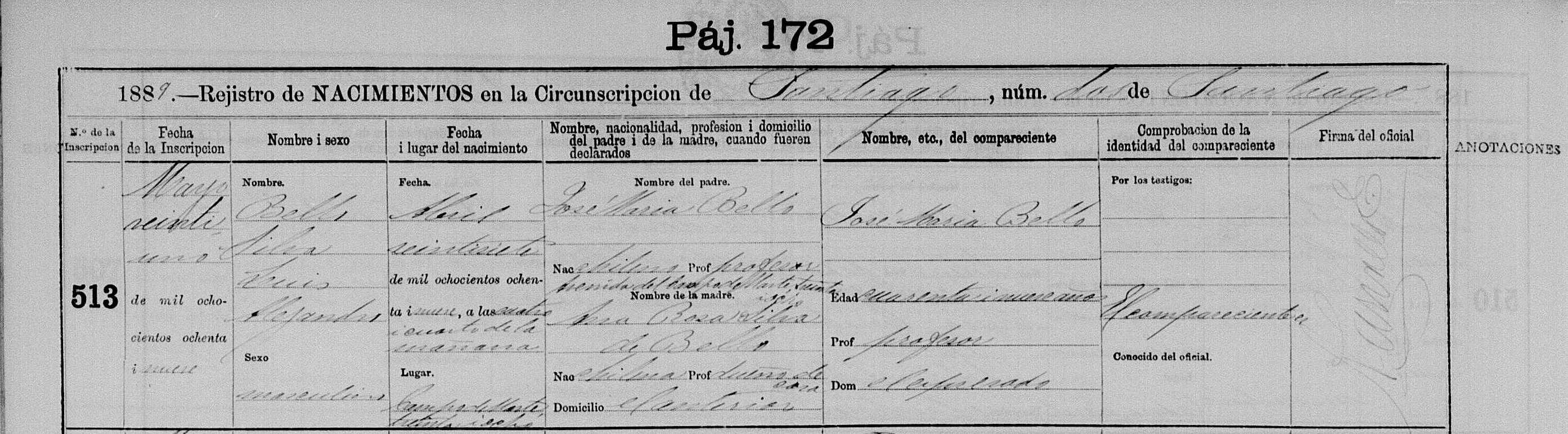
Bello Silva's birth certificate.

The third of four sons of José Maria Bello (the son of Andrés Bello) and Ana Rosa Silva, Bello lived in Ancud, Chile as a child, due to his father's banishment after the 1891 Chilean Civil War.

=== Disappearance ===
In the pre-dawn hours of 9 March 1914, Lieutenant Bello was in the Lo Espejo aerodrome, where he was to take an examination to earn the designation Military Pilot. Bello and two companions had to complete the circuit from Lo Espejo to Culitrín, to Cartagena, and back to Lo Espejo, in the central region of Chile, in order to pass the exam. The total distance of the flight was 111 miles, and should have taken two hours to complete.

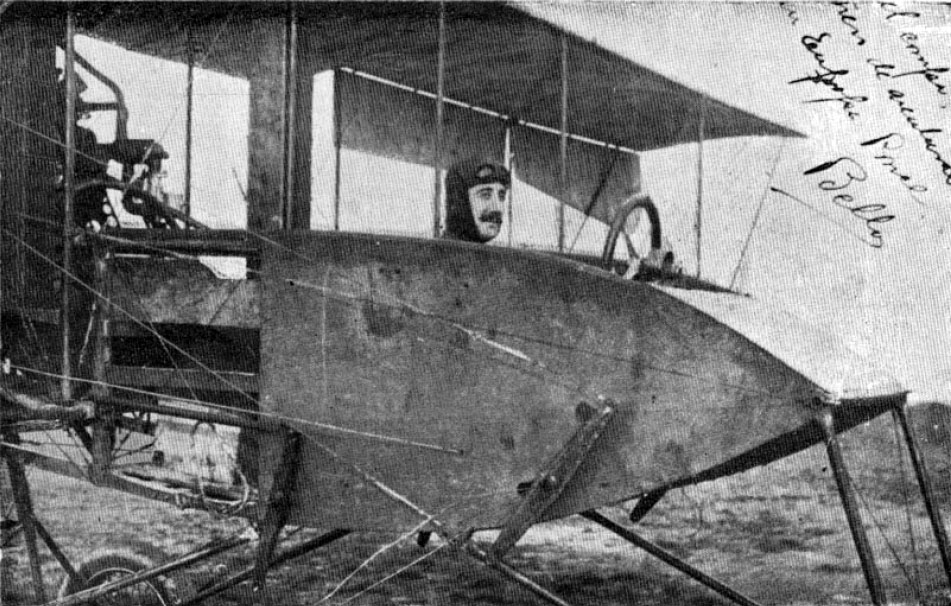
Bello in his aircraft

On the first attempt, the aviators had to return to base due to near-zero visibility caused by heavy fog. Bello damaged his aircraft during the landing, and switched to an 80 horsepower (60 kW) Sánchez-Besa biplane (tail number 13, nicknamed "Manuel Rodríguez") for the second attempt. He took off together with one companion and the instructor, who had to make an emergency landing for refueling. Nevertheless, Bello continued his route and was lost among the clouds.

At 09:30 hours, they undertook flight and an hour later Bello and Ponce were landed in Culitrín, where they agreed to wait for the conditions to continue their flight to Cartagena and then return to Lo Espejo.

Bello and Ponce were in Culitrín waiting for the south wind to cease, a situation that occurred around 16:00 hours, times when they checked the engines of their planes and Bello at 4:45 p.m. and Ponce at 4:50pm they en route to Cartagena.

In his subsequent report on the performance of his test, Lieutenant Ponce says:

"At 4.55 p.m. after a 10-minute test flight I departed about 5 minutes after Lieutenant Bello heading for Cartagena with a strong wind from the coast and a thick mist that prevented it from seeing clearly. Lieutenant Bello didn't miss a moment of sight, and at 6.20 p.m. about 20 or 30 kilometers to E. de Melipilla vi returning. I thought the clouds were too high, because we were shipping about 1900 meters away and I thought I'd do what I assumed Lieutenant Bello would do, go down to continue the road under the clouds. Lieutenant Bello was lost in sight and in the impossibility of continuing I went directly to the O. the wind blowing led me to very close to Angostura that I recognized for being very close to her."

At the school, Ponce claimed to have seen Lieutenant Bello flying in front of him, so he was presumed to have landed somewhere along the route, as information had also been received that he had landed in a camp near Llo-Lleo and was out of danger. However, the information was wrong.

=== Search ===
Search efforts were initiated the very day Bello disappeared. Several people claimed to have seen the aircraft land or crash, but these sightings were unsubstantiated. Various theories proposed at the time suggested that Bello had crashed into the sea or that the wrecked craft would be found in a mountain pass. Several expeditions were launched to locate a crash site, including one as recently as 1988, but no traces were found either of Lieutenant Bello or of the plane he was piloting. In the early 1930s, at a meeting of peasants, Carlos Peña y Lillo, journalist, correspondent of El Mercurio in San Vicente de Tagua Tagua, learns that one of them at the time that Lieutenant Bello was lost, a large explosion was heard at one of the ends of La Rinconada hill, which was later called for this reason "Quebrada del Diablo" or "Quebrada del Infierno". these statements were corroborated by Horacio Aránguiz Cerda, former deputy, resident in that area.

On 28 November 2007 an expedition set out for the commune of San Antonio, Chile. Two metal fragments belonging to an aircraft were found in the Cuncumén hills.

Jaime González Colville, of the Chilean Academy of History, considered it very unlikely that the remains of Lieutenant Bello should be found near Cuncumén.

== See also ==
- List of people who disappeared

== Lieutenant Bello in popular culture ==
- In Chile, the expression más perdido que el Teniente Bello ("more lost than Lieutenant Bello") is usually used to express one being lost, (ando más perdido que el teniente bello) or to express that someone is lost, (andas mas perdido que el teniente bello).
- In 1945, Chilean journalist and author Hugo Silva published the novel Pacha Pulai blending the story of Alejandro Bello with the legend of the City of the Caesars, which dates from Chile's colonial times.
- Mentioned in an episode of Diego and Glot, "Super Family", voiced by Don Francisco.
- His figure is used in the science fiction short story "The Prisoner" from the anthology Alucinaciones.TXT: Nueva antología de cuentos de literatura fantástica chilena (ISBN 978-956-8648-02-2). From that story later derives the novel The Shadow of Fire: The Final Flight of Lt. Bello. Also listed as a fictional character in other tales such as CHIL3: Relación del Reyno and the graphic novel 1899, which also blends elements of Pacha Pulai.
