= 1957 Pacific Ocean Boeing C-97 disappearance =

1957 aircraft disappearance

Coordinates: 34.299°N 143.407°E

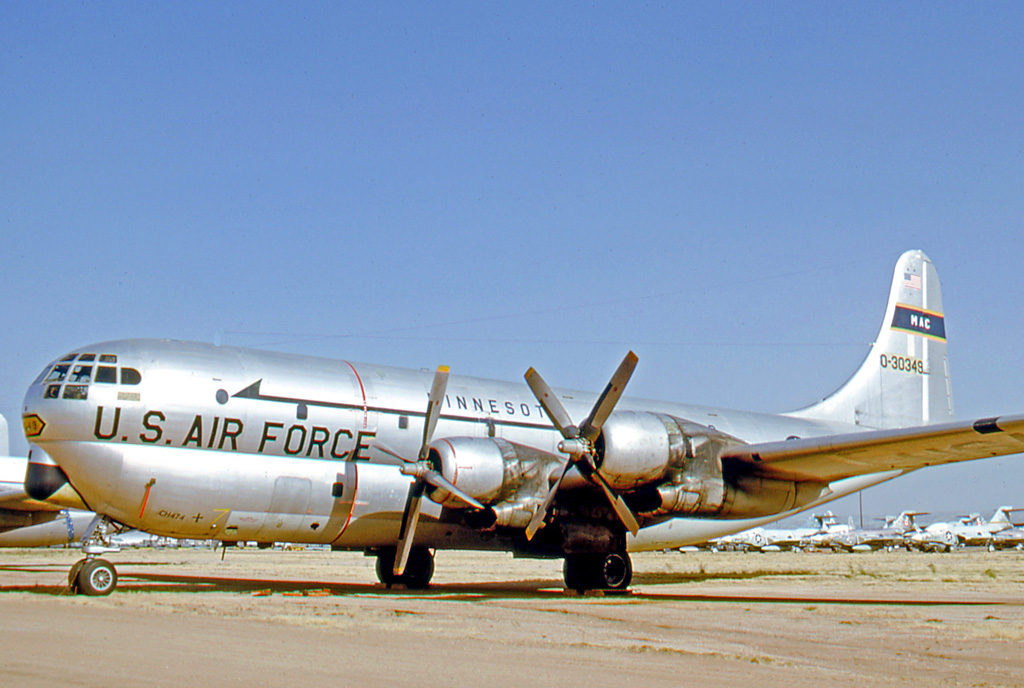
- 53-0349, an aircraft similar to the one involved

Disappearance
- Date: March 22, 1957
- Summary: Aircraft disappearance for unknown reasons
- Site: Pacific Ocean; about 200 miles east from Tokyo, Japan

Aircraft
- Aircraft type: Boeing C-97 Stratofreighter
- Operator: United States Air Force
- Registration: 50-0702
- Flight origin: Travis Air Force Base, California, United States
- 1st stopover: Hickam Air Force Base, Hawaii, United States
- Last stopover: Wake Island Airfield, Wake Island
- Destination: Yokota Air Base, Tokyo, Japan
- Occupants: 67
- Passengers: 57
- Crew: 10
- Fatalities: 67 (presumed)
- Survivors: 0 (presumed)

On Friday, March 22, 1957, a Boeing C-97 Stratofreighter of the United States Air Force (USAF), registered as 50-0702 and assigned to the 1501st Air Transport Wing group, was flying from Wake Island Airfield, Wake Island, to Yokota Air Base, Tokyo, Japan, with 57 passengers and 10 crew members on board. When the flight was about 200 miles east off the Japanese coast, the flight disappeared over the Pacific Ocean with everyone on board. This is the deadliest incident involving a Boeing C-97 and as of November 2026, no bodies or a single piece of the aircraft have been found.

== Aircraft ==
The aircraft involved, manufactured in 1950, was a Boeing C-97 Stratofreighter registered as 50–0702 with serial number 16246. The aircraft was assigned to the 1501st Air Transport Wing group.

== Disappearance ==
=== Before departure ===
Before departing Travis Air Force Base, another C-97 was assigned to fly to Japan. However, the plane was found with "minor maintenance problem" so 50-0702, the C-97 which disappeared, was then assigned the route.

=== After departure ===
While the flight was flying from Wake Island to Japan, it was under the instrument flight rules (IFR) and cruising at 8,000 feet. When the aircraft was about 200 miles east of the coast of Japan, last communications were heard from the aircraft at approximately 00:40 local time. About 20 minutes later, the flight unexplainably disappeared with all 67 occupants on board. No distress signals were received.

=== After disappearance ===
A commercial pilot who was flying some 30 minutes ahead of the C-97 reported cloudy weather between 5,000 feet and 10,000 feet whereas 50-0702 was at 8,000 feet. Light icing and light-to-moderate turbulence was also present in the area. Lightning was also noted by the pilot to the North of his position.

== Search ==
An air-sea search was conducted by the Japanese Coast Guard (JCG), United States Navy (USN), United States Air Force (USAF), and even some fishermen were involved to find the aircraft. About 48 Air Force and Navy planes searched an area of about 54,000 square miles on the day the C-97 disappeared. The USAF said that they would send 70 planes to search a 75,000 square mile area the next day after the C-97 disappeared. However, after eight days passed, no signs of the aircraft were found and search efforts were eventually ceased.

== Conclusion ==
Since the aircraft was not found, evidence was lacking. As a result, investigators were unable to find out why the aircraft disappeared. Poor weather conditions were also reported near the area where the aircraft was last heard from. To this day, the wreckage of the aircraft remains missing and so are the 67 occupants on board.
