= Moncrieff and Hood disappearance =

1928 disappearance of New Zealand aviation pioneers

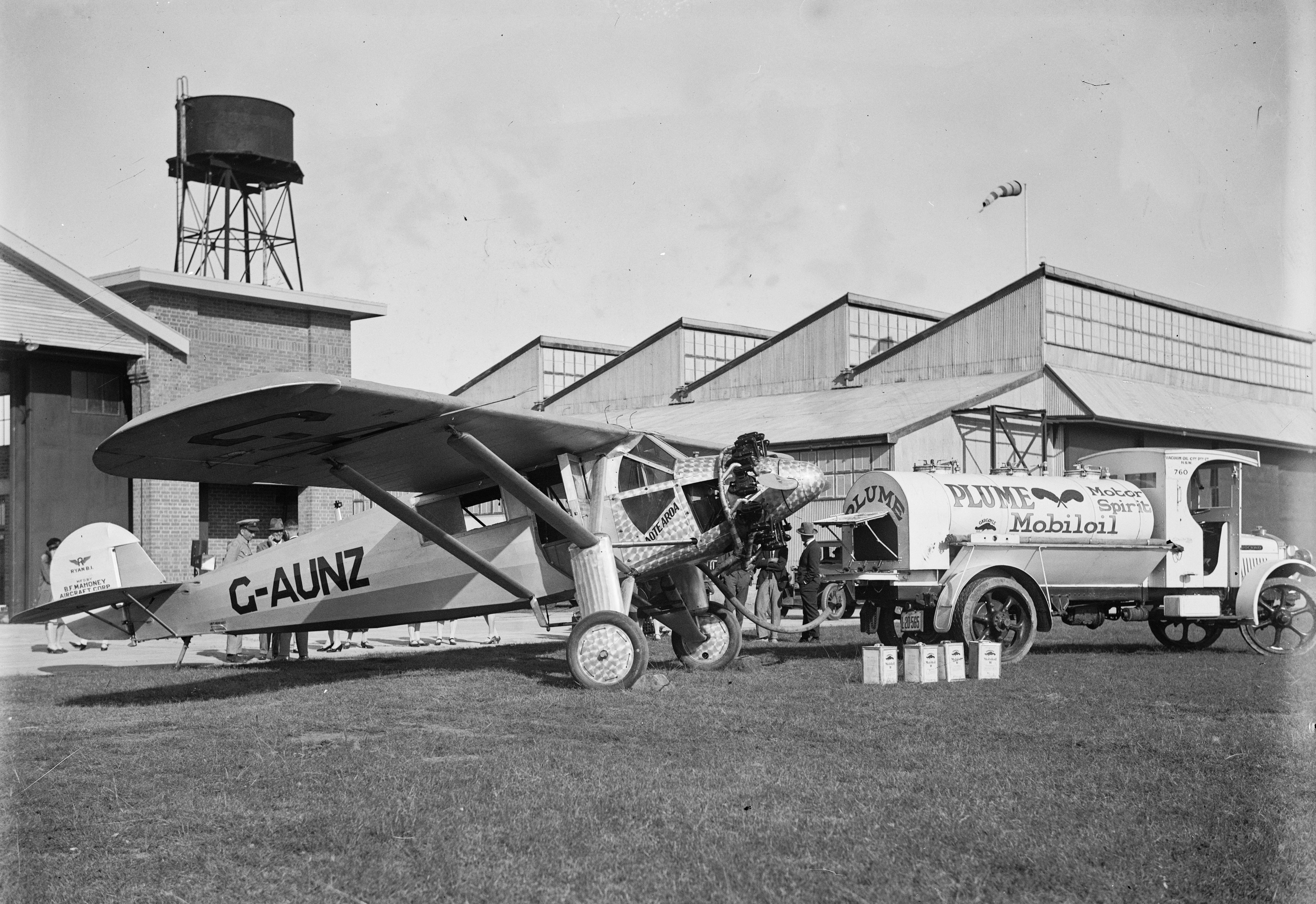
- G-AUNZ, the aircraft involved, seen shortly before its disappearance

Accident
- Date: 10 January 1928
- Summary: Disappearance
- Site: Tasman Sea

Aircraft
- Aircraft type: Ryan B-1 Brougham
- Aircraft name: Aotearoa
- Registration: G-AUNZ
- Flight origin: Point Cook, Victoria, Australia
- Destination: Trentham Racecourse, Upper Hutt, New Zealand
- Passengers: 0
- Crew: 2
- Missing: 2

Lieutenant John Moncrieff and Captain George Hood were two New Zealanders who vanished on 10 January 1928 while attempting the first trans-Tasman flight from Australia to New Zealand. Radio signals were received from their aircraft for 12 hours after their departure from Sydney, but despite a number of purported sightings in New Zealand, and many land searches in the intervening years, no trace of the aviators or their aircraft has ever been found.

== Pilots ==
=== Lieutenant John Moncrieff ===
John Robert Moncrieff was a New Zealander by adoption, being born at Lerwick in the Shetland Islands on 22 September 1894. Educated at Leith Academy in Scotland, he emigrated to New Zealand early at the age of 16 and trained as a motor engineer. He enlisted in the armed forces in December 1917, and took a flying course with the Canterbury (NZ) Aviation Company at the Sockburn aerodrome (later renamed Wigram Aerodrome). Qualifying for his wings after the 1918 Armistice brought an end to the First World War, he resumed his former position as second in charge in a motor garage in Wellington.

=== Captain George Hood ===
George Hood was born on 24 June 1891 in Masterton, the principal town of the Wairarapa district in the south-eastern part on the North Island of New Zealand. Educated in Masterton, he was the son of a local farmer and was fascinated with flying from boyhood. The First World War provided the opportunity for him to become an aviator. Leaving New Zealand in 1914 as a sergeant with the 9th (Wellington East Coast) Squadron of the Wellington Mounted Rifles Regiment, Hood transferred to the Army Service Corps in Egypt. He saw service with the New Zealand Expeditionary Force in Egypt and France. At the end of 1916 he transferred to the Royal Flying Corps, qualifying as a service pilot on 13 October 1917. Thirteen days later he was seriously injured in a crash while flying a DH5, which resulted in his lower right leg being amputated. Despite this he maintained an interest in aviation, and took every opportunity to continue flying on his return to New Zealand.

== Trans-Tasman attempt ==
=== Planning ===
Moncrieff had been wanting to fly the Tasman Sea for some time. In 1925, the Southland Times newspaper announced that Moncrieff was to "attempt a flight from Australia to New Zealand in a four-seater, 450 hp open-sea reconnaissance machine made by William Beardmore and Company". It was estimated about £8,500 would be needed to purchase the aircraft and to cover expenses, but little came of this proposal and Moncreiff's project lapsed for the time being.

However, in 1927, several notable ocean crossing flights were successfully completed. In May, Charles Lindbergh won the Orteig Prize by flying non-stop 3,600 miles (5,800 km) from New York to Paris in a single-engined Ryan monoplane; in June, lieutenants Lester J. Maitland and Albert Hergenberger flew 2,400 miles (3,900 km) from Oakland, California to Honolulu, Hawaii in a three-engined Fokker C-2 named "Bird of Paradise". Then, in October, Captain Dieudonne Costes and Lieutenant Commander Joseph Le Brix flew 2,125 miles (3,420 km) across the South Atlantic from Senegal to Port Natal in Brazil in a single-engined Breguet XIX. These flights raised aviation's profile and generated considerable interest among the general public.

After Lindbergh's flight, Moncrieff again proposed a trans-Tasman flight. On gaining some financial backing from an uncle, Moncrieff secured the assistance of Captain Ivan Kight, a well-known barrister and solicitor from Dannevirke, a rural town in the Tararua District. Kight had qualified as a pilot in 1916 and, like Moncrieff and Hood, was a founding member of the New Zealand Air Force, constituted as part of the Territorial Force in 1923. Kight became heavily involved in raising finance, organising the flight and dealing with the Australian and New Zealand governments. Hood, who at the time made a living driving a taxi in Masterton, came into the scheme at a later date, finding generous support from people in Wairarapa.

As the subscription list grew, Kight cabled Ryan Airlines Inc. in California for quotations on an aircraft similar to that used by Lindbergh during his trans-Atlantic flight. After Lindbergh's flight, Moncrieff, Kight and Hood felt confident that a Ryan monoplane would be suitable for the 1,430-mile (2,300 km) Tasman flight, even though Lindbergh's custom-built Spirit of St. Louis differed significantly from the production version of the Ryan Brougham that was ordered for the Tasman flight.

=== Aircraft ===
The crossing would be attempted in a slightly modified early model Ryan B-1 Brougham high-wing monoplane named the Aotearoa. It was powered by a 220-horsepower (160 kW) nine-cylinder air-cooled Wright J-5 radial engine. The standard aircraft had five seats, arranged as two pairs front and rear, with a single fifth seat behind the rear pair; but to give the necessary range an extra fuel tank was fitted in the cabin in the place normally occupied by the front left seat, giving a total fuel capacity of 200 imperial gallons (910 L), and a flight duration of about 20 hours. The extra fuel tank created an unforeseen problem as it precluded any chance of pilots changing places in the air. This restricted the control of the aircraft to one person for the duration of the flight, and meant any other crew members were essentially passengers. The aircraft was named after the most widely known and commonly accepted Māori name for New Zealand, which is usually translated as "the land of the long white cloud". It was registered G-AUNZ, thus referencing both countries of departure and destination in its official designation.

The Aotearoa was delivered in boxes to Point Cook, Melbourne, where it was reassembled. It was test-flown by Moncrieff on 29 December 1927. On 2 January, Aotearoa took off for Richmond, near Sydney, piloted by Moncrieff and with Hood, Kight and Aircraftman F. Ward from No 1 Squadron of the Royal Australian Air Force on board. Several hours later they landed near Bong Bong, an hour short of their destination and uncertain of their position. During the flight they believed they were sending radio messages but found on landing that their radio had not been working at all.

On arrival at Richmond the following day, the engine was checked and adjusted, and the radio and generator overhauled. After a further short test flight on 7 January, Moncrieff ordered the aircraft to be fuelled for the flight to New Zealand.

While all these preparations were going on there were a number of exchanges between the Australian and New Zealand governments over the suitability of the Aotearoa for the flight. In September 1927, the Australian aviation authorities had prohibited a Lieutenant K. M . Frewen from attempting a flight from Hobart, Tasmania, to Bluff unless Frewen used a seaplane, in the belief that a landplane was not suitable for long-distance flights over water. The Australian federal authorities then went further when they announced that they "intended to prevent the carrying of passengers in any machine that was not either a seaplane, a flying boat, or an amphibian on any flight over the sea for a greater distance than 50 miles". The Aotearoa was a landplane, with no ability to land on the sea. After a somewhat confused and confusing exchange of messages, the matter was finally clarified on 3 January, when the Australians announced that a veto on the flight had been lifted after an exchange of cables with the New Zealand government.

It had always been the intention that the aircraft would carry only two people on the Tasman flight. As Moncrieff had been the only person to pilot the Aotearoa, and the trip was his idea, he was the obvious choice as pilot. On 6 January, Kight and Hood tossed a coin to decide who would be the second crewman, with Hood winning the toss. The flight was expected to take about 14 hours, so a take-off in the early morning hours was necessary to enable a landing in daylight at Trentham Racecourse, the chosen destination in the Hutt Valley north of Wellington.

With the aircraft and the crew ready, and the way cleared by the aviation authorities, attention turned to the weather. On the evening of 9 January, conditions were assessed as "particularly favourable" and Moncrieff and Hood went to Richmond to prepare the aircraft. After further weather information from New Zealand and ships at sea, they decided to take off on their flight.

=== Flight ===
The engine was started at 02:00 Sydney time on Tuesday 10 January 1928, but an over-supply of engine oil caused oil to spray on to the windscreen. This was quickly fixed, but press reporters insisting on last-minute interviews further delayed take-off and the Aotearoa did not become airborne until 02:44 (05:14 New Zealand time), immediately turning on course for New Zealand. The take-off on the Tasman flight was only the aircraft's fifth since being reassembled after delivery.

Thirty-two minutes later, at 05:46 NZ time, the officer of the watch on the trans-Tasman steamer Maunganui, 12 miles (19 km) east of Sydney Heads, heard "the soft regular whirr" of an aircraft engine passing overhead, although he did not see the aircraft itself. The timing and the position of the steamer indicated an aircraft ground speed of 90 miles per hour (140 km/h), about right for the intended flight.

For simplicity, Moncrieff and Hood had planned to fly a rhumb line course, intending to make landfall at Farewell Spit at the western entrance to Cook Strait. This was not the shortest course—that would have required more complicated navigation to fly a great circle course—but the difference over the trans-Tasman flight was not prohibitive. Unexpected winds could cause a drift north or south of the intended course, making an exact landfall unlikely, but the Aotearoa carried no flight instruments that could detect or compensate for such a drift. The radio had no navigational capability or function.

Arrangements for radio contact were for the aircraft to send out a continuous tone for five minutes every quarter of an hour, as the pilots had only a rudimentary knowledge of Morse code. This schedule was not adhered to, for the tone was heard for longer periods at irregular intervals. Excitement mounted in New Zealand during the day, and by early evening an estimated 10,000 people had arrived at Trentham to greet the airmen, including Dorothy Moncrieff and Laura Hood, the aviators' wives.

=== Missing ===
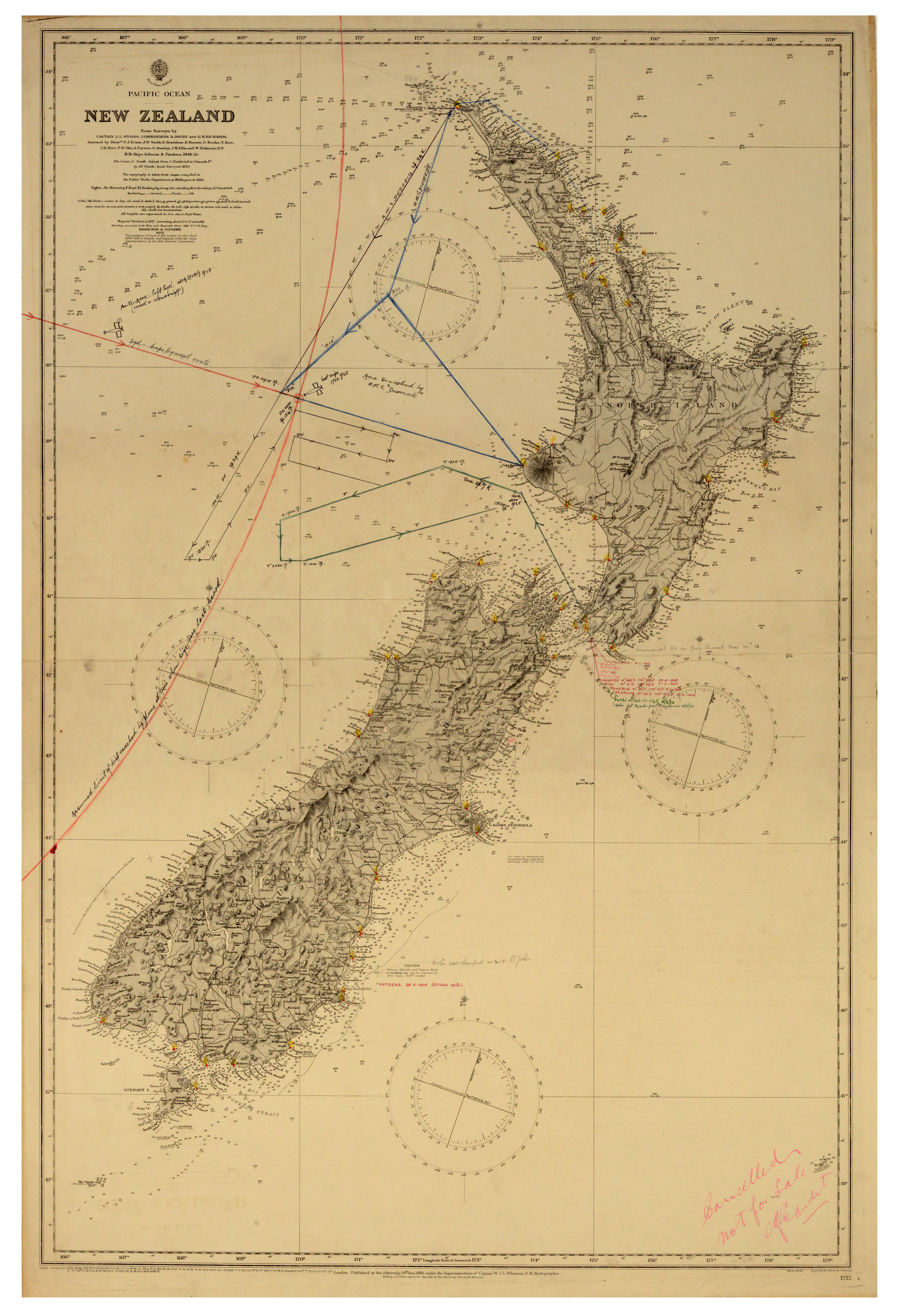
Search activity for Hood and Moncrieff drawn on 1885 map of New Zealand

At 17:22 NZ time, when the aircraft had been in the air for just over 12 hours, and should have been within about 200 mi (320 km) off New Zealand's coast, signals from the Aotearoa ceased abruptly.

With the cessation of radio signals hopefulness gave way to anxiety, although the relatively poor reliability of airborne radio at the time did not necessarily mean that loss of signal equalled the loss of the aircraft. Searchlights were used to illuminate the clouds that were building up, and rockets were still being sent up at 01:40 on 11 January, but the crowd waited in vain. Moncrieff, Hood, and the Aotearoa were never seen again.

Many reports of supposed sightings of the aircraft came in during the evening and night of 10 to 11 January, of varying degrees of credibility. Most claimed to see the lights of the Aotearoa, although Kight affirmed the aircraft carried no navigation lights or flares, and the only source of light apart from the aircraft's exhaust was a small pocket torch that would not be seen at any distance. Some of the most apparently reliable sightings could be interpreted as the Aotearoa making landfall north of the intended track near Cape Egmont, tracking along the Southern Taranaki coast, and then cutting across the South Taranaki Bight to the coast near Paekākāriki, intending to round Cape Terawhiti and fly up Wellington Harbour to the Hutt Valley. This would have been a valid scenario if the aircraft had drifted north of its intended trans-Tasman course.

=== Searches ===
Starting on 11 January, air, sea and land searches were carried out for many days in the hope of finding the aviators alive at sea, or on a remote beach, or at least of finding some wreckage that might indicate their fate. Nothing was found at the time. Many land searches have been made since then, mostly centring on Mount Stokes, at 1,203 metres (3,947 ft) the highest point in the rugged bush-covered Marlborough Sounds area, based on a number of supposed sightings in the area. No evidence has ever been found of the Aotearoa's wreckage, or any other trace of the aviators. A chance sighting of what may have been plane wreckage in dense bush near Tōtaranui in what is now Abel Tasman National Park by youths in the 1960s led to a full-scale search of the area in 2013. No wreckage was found.

The occurrence of supposed sightings around the time and approximate place of an expected arrival mirrored generally similar events after the first attempted Paris-New York flight by Nungesser and Coli in May 1927, where many reports of sightings were made in North America, and land searches are still carried out from time to time.

== Legacy ==
The Aotearoa was the first aircraft to go missing in or near New Zealand. While other aircraft had crashed, until Moncrieff and Hood's flight, none were lost without trace. In 1931, the Masterton aerodrome was renamed Hood Aerodrome, the name it still bears today. A number of streets throughout New Zealand are named "Moncrieff" or "Hood" as memorials to the pioneers.

== The first successful flight ==
On 11 September 1928 two Australians, Charles Kingsford Smith and Charles Ulm, achieved what Hood and Moncrieff had died attempting, when they landed the Southern Cross at Wigram, Christchurch.

== See also ==
- List of people who disappeared mysteriously at sea
