= Édouard Bague =

French aviator

Édouard Jean Bague
- Born: 19 May 1879; Paris
- Died: 5 June 1911 (aged 32); Mediterranean Sea, near Cap d'Antibes
- Cause of death: Air accident (presumed)
- Known for: Disappeared on 5 June 1911 while attempting to fly from Nice to Corsica
- Aviation career
- Flight license: 23 November 1910; Paris

Édouard Jean Bague (1879 – 1911) was a French aviator. A lieutenant in the Algerian tirailleurs, he obtained his aviators's licence (number 337) from the Aéro-Club de France on 23 November 1910. He resigned his commission early in 1911 to concentrate on aviation and, in particular, his plan to cross the Mediterranean by air. In the same year he published two books, Mes premières impressions d'aviateur and Nice-Gorgone en aéroplane under the name Édouard Bague.

== Career ==
In an initial attempt in March 1911, Bague planned to fly from Antibes to Ajaccio, Corsica, from there to Sardinia and then via Sicily to Tunis.

On that occasion, due to a navigation error, he did not reach Ajaccio. Instead, after a flight which began at 7.30am and ended at 1.00pm, Bague landed on the small wooded Italian island of Gorgona. His Blériot monoplane was seriously damaged on landing, and Bague was injured. The distance of over 200 km he covered on this occasion established a new record for a flight over the sea. According to a Reuters report, his escape from death on this occasion was considered "miraculous".

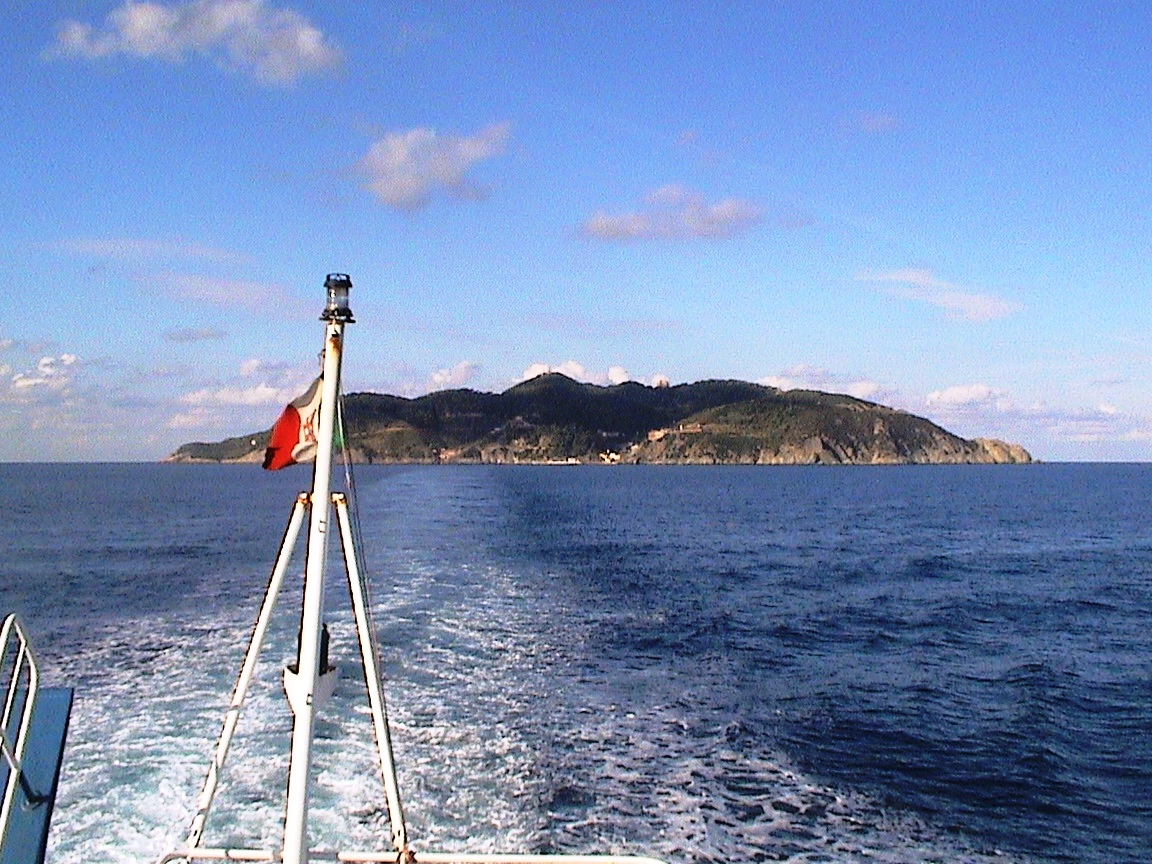
Gorgona, where Bague landed in March 1911

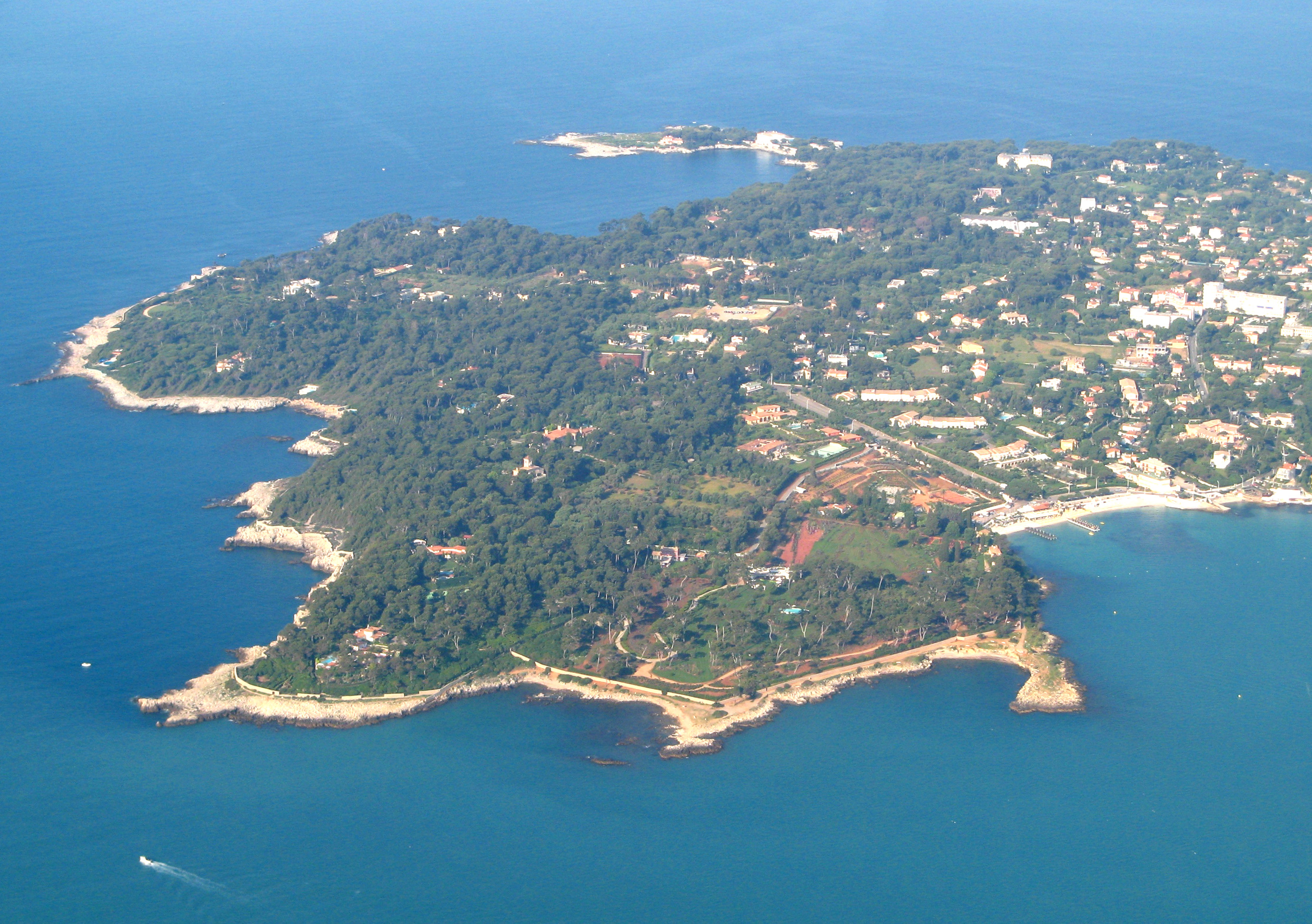
Cap d'Antibes, near where Bague disappeared in June 1911

On 5 June 1911, Bague made a second attempt to cross the Mediterranean by air. His planned itinerary was:

- Nice to Calvi, Corsica (170 km)
- Calvi to Ajaccio, Corsica (80 km)
- Ajaccio to Sassari, Sardinia (150 km)
- Sassari to Cagliari, Sardinia (200 km)
- Cagliari to Bizerta, Tunisia (200 km)
- Bizerta to Tunis (80 km)

== Disappearance and search ==
His aircraft disappeared shortly after departing from Nice. It was reported that he embarked on the flight without a compass. A witness reported sighting an aircraft apparently in difficulty in the area through which Bague would have been expected to have been flying.

Several French naval vessels undertook an extensive sea search for Bague; the Ministry of the Marine despatched the destroyer Arbalète and six torpedo boats from Ajaccio and the destroyer Mousqueton and six torpedo boats from Toulon. However, no trace of Bague or his airplane was found, then or subsequently.

== See also ==
- List of people who disappeared mysteriously at sea
