= 1945 RAAF Douglas C-47 disappearance =

Airplane disappearance over the Timor Sea

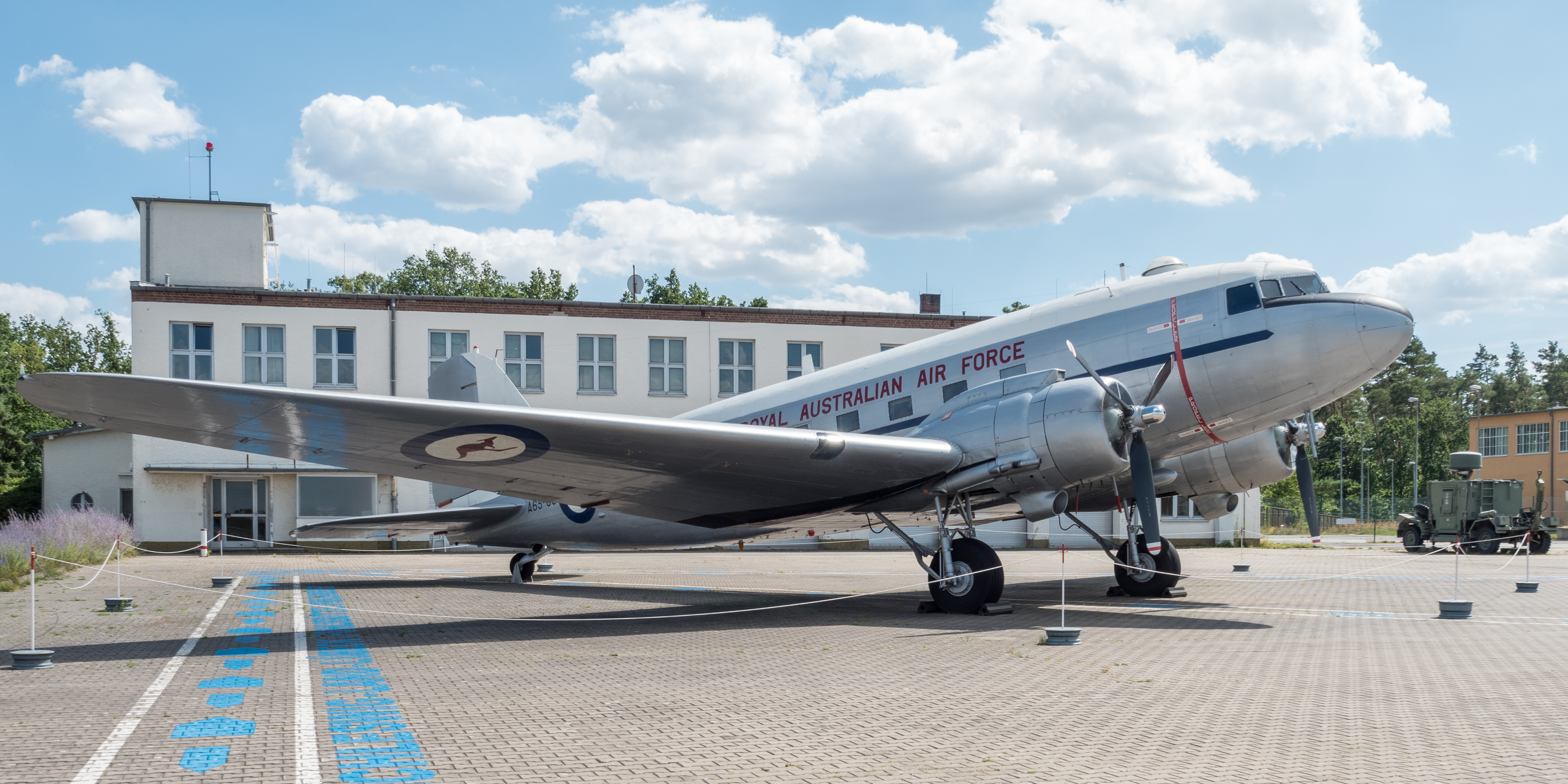
- A Royal Australian Air Force C-47B, similar to the aircraft involved

Disappearance
- Date: 19 December 1945; 80 years, 4 months and 7 days ago
- Summary: Disappeared over Timor Sea in bad weather
- Site: Over Timor Sea, Indian Ocean

Aircraft
- Aircraft type: Douglas C-47B
- Operator: Royal Australian Air Force
- Registration: A65-83
- Flight origin: Pattimura International Airport, Indonesia
- Destination: Darwin International Airport, Australia
- Occupants: 25
- Passengers: 21
- Crew: 4
- Fatalities: 25 (presumed)
- Survivors: 0 (presumed)

On December 19, 1945, a RAAF C-47 with 25 people on board crashed on or near an island in the Timor area of the Banda Sea during a storm. All 25 people on board are presumed dead.

The plane had been assigned to the Royal Australian Air Force in March 1945 with the call sign VH-CIZ and assigned to 35 Squadron as an air ambulance.

The aircraft departed from Morotai and flew to Ambon en route to Darwin, piloted by Pilot Officer Francis Robinson. It left Ambon at 10.40AM and, about an hour into the flight, indicated that it wished to place a message. Darwin Aeradio asked the plane to "go ahead" but no response was received.

The following day, a message from the plane claimed that all 22 passengers and 4 crew were "alive... all alive" and were "waiting to be picked up". A second, garbled message, which included the Dakota's call sign CIZ, was also intercepted. Two days after that, a civilian engineer reported picking up a final message stating “Darwin from Timor... waiting to be picked up.”

Search efforts at the time proved fruitless and no trace of the plane or those it carried has been found. Without a precise crash site to investigate, the Australian Defence Force have refused to fund a search for the remains, although private efforts to undertake a search continue.
