= Varig Flight 967 =

1979 disappearance of a cargo flight from Japan to Brazil

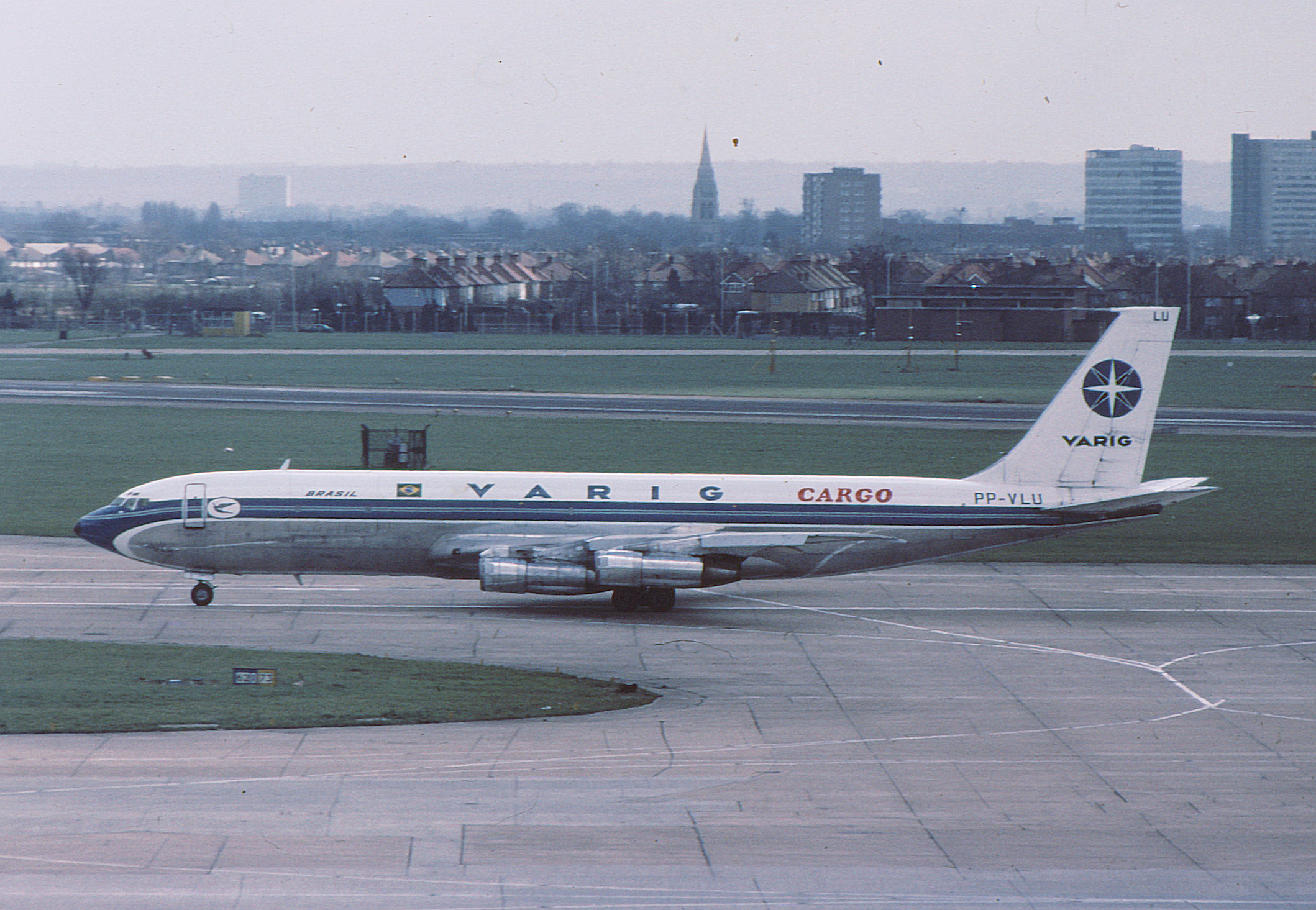
- PP-VLU, the missing aircraft, in March 1978

Incident
- Date: 30 January 1979
- Summary: Disappearance
- Site: Pacific Ocean, 200 km (110 nmi; 120 mi) ENE of Tokyo, Japan

Aircraft
- Aircraft type: Boeing 707-323C
- Operator: Varig
- IATA flight No.: RG967
- ICAO flight No.: VRG967
- Call sign: VARIG 967
- Registration: PP-VLU
- Flight origin: Narita International Airport, Tokyo, Japan
- Stopover: Los Angeles International Airport, US
- Destination: Rio de Janeiro–Galeão International Airport, Brazil
- Occupants: 6
- Passengers: 0
- Crew: 6
- Missing: 6

Varig Flight 967 was an international cargo flight from Narita International Airport in Japan to Rio de Janeiro–Galeão International Airport in Brazil, with a stopover at Los Angeles International Airport in the United States. On 30 January 1979, the Boeing 707 serving the flight disappeared while en route to Los Angeles with radio contact being lost an hour into the flight. Neither the aircraft nor its six crew members have ever been found.

== Background ==
=== Aircraft ===
The aircraft involved was a Boeing 707-323C, construction number 19235, line number 519, delivered new to American Airlines and registered as N7562A on 31 August 1966. The aircraft was operated under its cargo subsidiary before being sold to Varig Cargo on 28 March 1974 and re-registered as PP-VLU. The jet was powered by four Pratt & Whitney JT3D-3B engines.

=== Flight crew ===
The flight crew consisted of Captain Gilberto Araújo da Silva, 55, First Officer Erni Peixoto Mylius, 45, Second Officers Antonio Brasileiro da Silva Neto, 39, Evan Braga Saunders, 37, and Flight Engineers José Severino Gusmão de Araújo, 42, and Nicola Exposito, 40.

In 1973, Captain Araújo da Silva was the Captain of Varig Flight 820, a Boeing 707 carrying 134 people that made an emergency landing due to a fire before it was due to land at Orly Airport in Paris, with the loss of 123 passengers and crew. In 1979, at the time of disappearance, he had more than 23,000 hours logged.

== Disappearance ==
On 30 January 1979, PP-VLU disappeared en route from Narita International Airport to Los Angeles International Airport while operating as Varig Flight 967. Its ultimate destination was Rio de Janeiro–Galeão International Airport.

The flight took off at 20:23 from Narita International Airport. The last radio contact with the flight was at 20:45. The flight crew were expected to radio at 21:23, but they did not do so. Radio contact was lost about 200 km (120 mi) ENE of Tokyo.

The cargo included 53 paintings by Manabu Mabe returning from an exhibition in Tokyo, valued at US$1.24 million. The wreckage, paintings, and bodies of the crew were never found.

== See also ==
- List of accidents and incidents involving commercial aircraft
- List of missing aircraft

=== Similar incidents ===
- 1948 Airborne Transport DC-3 (DST) disappearance
- 1951 Canadian Pacific Air Lines Douglas DC-4 disappearance
- 1953 Skyways Avro York disappearance
- 1990 Faucett Perú Boeing 727 disappearance
- 2003 Angola Boeing 727 disappearance
- BSAA Star Ariel disappearance
- BSAA Star Tiger disappearance
- Flying Tiger Line Flight 739
- Hawaii Clipper
- Malaysia Airlines Flight 370
- Flight 19
