= Canadian Pacific Air Lines Flight 3505 =

1951 missing passenger plane flight

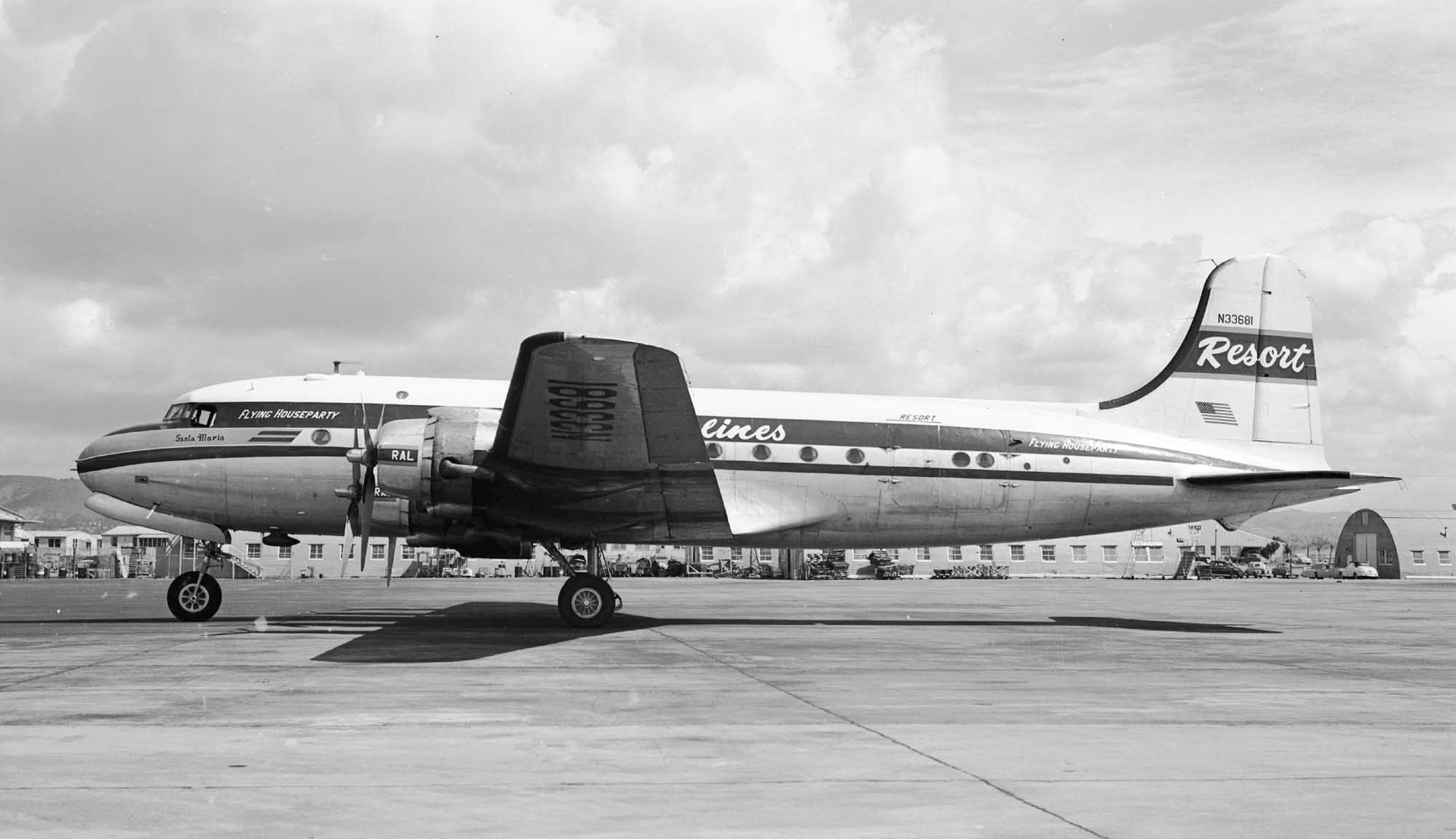
- A Douglas DC-4 similar to the missing aircraft

Missing Aircraft
- Date: July 21, 1951
- Summary: Disappeared, possibly due to icing conditions
- Site: probably Alaska, U.S.

Aircraft
- Aircraft type: Douglas C-54A/R5D-1 Skymaster
- Operator: Canadian Pacific Air Lines on behalf of the United Nations
- Registration: CF-CPC
- Flight origin: Vancouver International Airport, British Columbia, Canada
- Stopover: Elmendorf Air Force Base, Alaska, U.S.
- Destination: Haneda Army Air Base, Tokyo, Japan
- Passengers: 31
- Crew: 6
- Fatalities: 37
- Survivors: 0

Canadian Pacific Air Lines Flight 3505 was a scheduled flight operated by Canadian Pacific Air Lines for the United Nations from Vancouver, Canada, to Tokyo, Japan. On 21 July 1951, the Douglas C-54 Skymaster, registered CF-CPC, disappeared with 31 passengers and six crew onboard. The incident marked the first aircraft loss during the Korean Airlift.

== Accident ==
At 18:35, the aircraft departed Vancouver International Airport, Canada on a scheduled flight to Tokyo; it was due to stop over at Anchorage Airport in Alaska. The flight was on schedule and reported at the Cape Spencer intersection in British Columbia 90 minutes out from Anchorage; it gave an estimate of 24:00 for Yakutat in Alaska. The weather in the area was heavy rain and icing conditions with a visibility of 500 feet (150 m). Nothing further was heard from the aircraft, and at 00:44 an emergency warning was issued when the aircraft was overdue to report. The United States Air Force and Royal Canadian Air Force carried out an extensive search but failed to find any trace of the aircraft or its 37 occupants. The search was finally called off on 31 October 1951.

== Aircraft ==
The aircraft had been built in 1944 for the United States Army Air Forces as a Douglas C-54A Skymaster but was diverted to the United States Navy on delivery in June 1944, with the designation R5D-1. In 1946, it was converted to a civil Douglas DC-4 standard for Pan American Airlines as Clipper Winged Racer. It was sold to Canadian Pacific Airlines in 1950.

== Passengers and crew ==
All six crew members were Canadian. The 31 passengers included two sailors of the Royal Canadian Navy, 26 members of the United States military and 3 civilian US citizens.

== Aftermath ==
None of the passengers aboard the aircraft were ever found. The aircraft was presumed destroyed beyond repair.

== Probable cause ==
In 1974, the Civil Aviation Authority (United Kingdom) reported: "As no traces of the aircraft or its occupants has been found to date the cause of the disappearance has not been determined."

== Similar accidents ==
- 1979 Varig Boeing 707 disappearance
- 1948 Airborne Transport DC-3 (DST) disappearance
- 1953 Skyways Avro York disappearance
- BSAA Star Ariel disappearance
- BSAA Star Tiger disappearance
- Flying Tiger Line Flight 739
- Hawaii Clipper
- Malaysia Airlines Flight 370
