= Flying Tiger Line Flight 739 =

1962 aircraft disappearance west of Guam

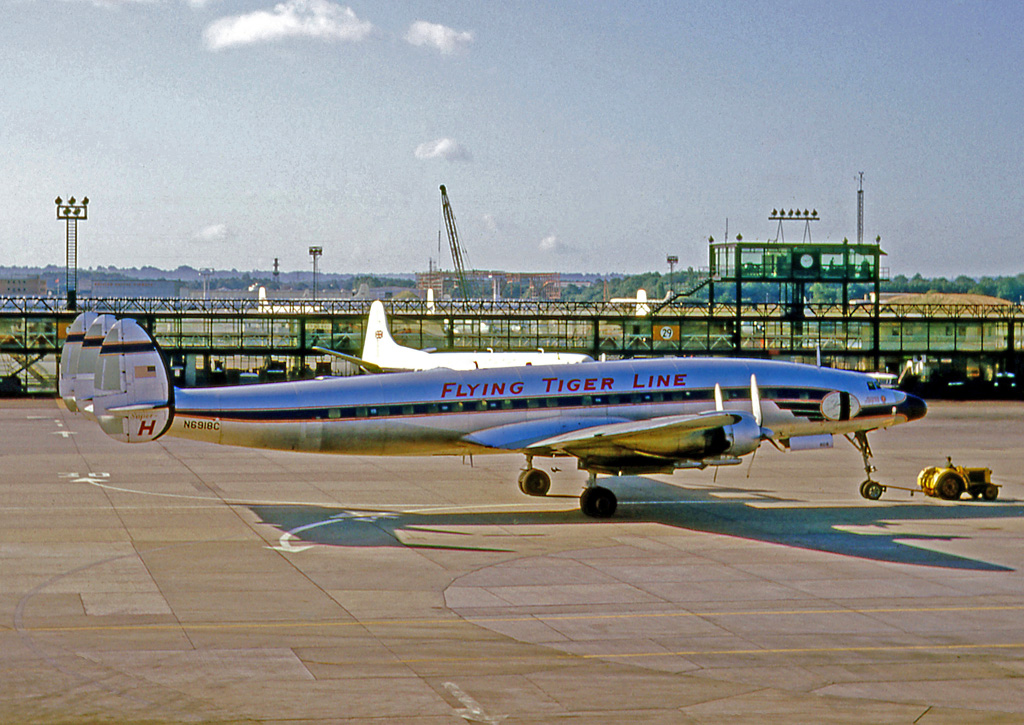
- A Lockheed Constellation L-1049, similar to the aircraft involved

Disappearance
- Date: March 16, 1962
- Summary: Disappearance, possible in-flight explosion
- Site: Unknown; Last known position: 13°40′N 140°0′E

Aircraft
- Aircraft type: Lockheed Constellation L-1049H
- Operator: Flying Tiger Line
- Registration: N6921C
- Flight origin: Travis Air Force Base (SUU); California, US
- 1st stopover: Honolulu (HNL)
- 2nd stopover: Wake Island Airfield (AWK)
- 3rd stopover: Guam (UAM)
- Last stopover: Clark Air Base (CRK), Philippines
- Destination: Saigon (SGN), South Vietnam
- Occupants: 107
- Passengers: 96
- Crew: 11
- Fatalities: 107 (presumed)
- Missing: 107
- Survivors: 0 (presumed)

Flying Tiger Line Flight 739 was a Lockheed L-1049 Super Constellation propliner that disappeared on March 16, 1962, over the western Pacific Ocean. The aircraft, which had been chartered by the United States Army, was transporting ninety-six military passengers from Travis Air Force Base in California to Tan Son Nhat International Airport in Saigon, South Vietnam. After refueling at Andersen Air Force Base in Guam, the Super Constellation disappeared while en route to Clark Air Base in the Philippines. All 107 aboard were declared missing and presumed dead.

The airliner's disappearance prompted one of the largest air and sea searches in the history of the Pacific. Aircraft and surface ships from four branches of the US military searched more than 144,000 square miles (370,000 km^{2}) during the course of eight days. A civilian tanker observed what appeared to be an in-flight explosion believed to be the missing Super Constellation, though no trace of wreckage or debris was ever recovered.

The Civil Aeronautics Board (CAB) determined that, based on the tanker's observations, Flight 739 probably exploded in-flight, though an exact cause could not be determined without examining the remnants of the aircraft. This was the deadliest single-aircraft aviation accident involving the Super Constellation.

== Flight ==
The accident aircraft was a five-year-old Lockheed L-1049H Super Constellation with 17,224 airframe hours. It carried eleven American civilian crew members and ninety-six military passengers. The flight was operated by the Flying Tiger Line as Military Air Transport Service (MATS) Flight 739, chartered by the United States Army. The Super Constellation carried 93 Ranger-trained Army communications specialists en route to South Vietnam. Their orders were to relieve soldiers in Saigon who had been training South Vietnamese troops to fight Viet Cong guerrillas. Also on board were three members of the South Vietnamese military. The flight crew consisted of eleven civilians based out of California, including seven men, under the command of Captain Gregory P. Thomas.

Flight 739 departed Travis Air Force Base, California, at 05:45 GMT, on March 14, 1962, and set its course for Saigon. There were four planned refueling stops: Honolulu International Airport in Hawaii; Wake Island Airfield; Andersen Air Base in Guam; and Clark Air Base in the Philippines. The flight arrived at Guam at 11:14 GMT, on March 15, after being delayed for minor maintenance on engines numbers 1 and 3 at Honolulu, and later at Wake Island. The aircraft departed from Guam at 12:57 GMT with an estimated time of arrival at the Philippines at 19:16 GMT. The Super Constellation carried nine hours' worth of fuel for the six-hours-and-nineteen-minutes' flight of 1,600 miles (2,600 km).

Eighty minutes after departure, at 14:22 GMT, the captain radioed a routine message and gave his position as being 280 nautical miles (520 km; 320 mi) west of Guam at coordinates (13°40′N 140°0′E). The aircraft was expected to reach 14°0′N 135°0′E at 15:30. At that time, the Guam International Flight Service Station experienced temporary communication difficulties with heavy radio static. At 15:39 the Guam radio operator attempted to contact Flight 739 for a position report but was unable to establish contact. The aircraft was not seen or heard from again.

== Investigation ==
The Clark Field Rescue Coordinating Center declared the aircraft missing on the morning of March 16, 1962. United States Navy officials reported that they believed that the aircraft had crashed closer to Guam than the Philippines. At the time of the disappearance, the weather was clear and the sea was calm. The Navy, Air Force, Coast Guard, and Marines ordered aircraft and ships to the area.

The first day of searching continued overnight. Over the first two days in the search, vessels crisscrossed 75,000 square miles (190,000 km^{2}) of ocean. US Secretary of the Army Elvis Stahr told newspapers that "we have not given up hope that it will be found and that those aboard are safe," and that a "maximum effort" was being made. After four days of searching, Major General Theodore R. Milton of the 13th Air Force told newspapers that although the chance of finding survivors was doubtful, every effort would be made "as long as there is any hope at all."

Search efforts included aircraft from Clark Air Field, the United States Seventh Fleet, and the Air Force detachment at Kadena Air Base in Okinawa, Japan. Additionally, surface ships and aircraft from numerous US bases in the western Pacific contributed to the search efforts. After eight days, however, the search was called off. The search, which was at the time one of the largest to ever take place in the Pacific, had covered more than 200,000 square miles (520,000 km^{2}) of ocean.

=== Speculation of foul play ===
Flight 739 was one of two Flying Tiger Line flights with military connections that had been destroyed under similar circumstances on the same day. This led both airline officials and the press to offer suggestions of sabotage and conspiracy.

Both Flight 739 and the other aircraft, an L-1049 Super Constellation, departed from Travis Air Force Base at around 09:45 PST on Wednesday, March 14, 1962, and both encountered difficulties several hours later. The other aircraft was carrying "secret military cargo" when it crashed in the Aleutian Islands and caught fire.

Flying Tiger Lines released a statement outlining some possible reasons for the two occurrences, including sabotage of either or both aircraft or kidnapping of Flight 739 and its passengers. The airline also said that these were merely "wild guesses" and that there was no evidence to support either theory.

=== Possibility of sabotage ===
A Liberian tanker, the SS T L Linzen, reported seeing a bright light in the sky near the aircraft's expected position about ninety minutes after the last radio contact. US military officials described it as being a "bright light strong enough to light a ship's decks". It was reported that the tanker observed a flash of light approximately 500 miles (800 km) west of Guam, followed immediately by two red lights falling to the ocean at different speeds.

A Civil Aeronautics Board (CAB) investigation determined that crewmen aboard the tanker also observed what appeared to be vapor trails, and observed the two fireballs fall into the ocean. The tanker proceeded to the location where the fireballs had been observed to fall into the ocean but was unable to find any trace of the falling objects during their six-hour search. A spokesman at the rescue effort command post in Guam said that as time passed with no sign of the aircraft, "more credence is given to the possibility that the tanker may have seen the missing aircraft explode in flight."

Officials with the Flying Tiger Line said that their earlier theories of sabotage would be bolstered were the investigation to reveal that an explosion had occurred. The executive vice president of operations said that experts considered it impossible for explosions to occur on the Super Constellation in the course of normal operation. Additionally, he claimed that there was nothing powerful enough aboard the aircraft to completely blow it apart, and that "something violent must have happened."

The CAB determined that, given the observations of the tanker crew, the flight most likely exploded in midair. As no part of the wreckage was ever found, the agency was unable to establish a determination of cause. The accident report concluded:

A summation of all relevant factors tends to indicate that the aircraft was destroyed in flight. However, due to the lack of any substantiating evidence the Board is unable to state with any degree of certainty the exact fate of N6921C.

== See also ==
- List of missing aircraft

Other similar incidents and accidents (incomplete)

- 1990 Faucett Perú 727 disappearance
- 2003 Boeing 727-223 disappearance
- Adam Air Flight 574
- Air France Flight 447
- Arrow Air Flight 1285R – another disaster involving US troop transport
- Canadian Pacific Air Lines Flight 3505 – another disaster involving US troop transport
- Indonesia AirAsia Flight 8501
- Malaysia Airlines Flight 370
- Varig Flight 967
