= List of Bermuda Triangle incidents =

This is a list of incidents attributed in popular culture to the Bermuda Triangle or the Devil's Triangle.

== Aircraft incidents (10) ==
- 1945: July 10, Thomas Arthur Garner, AMM3, USN, along with eleven other crew members, was lost at sea in a US Navy PBM3S patrol seaplane, Bu. No.6545, Sqd VPB2-OTU#3, in the Bermuda Triangle. They left Naval Air Station, Banana River, Florida, at 7:07 p.m. on July 9, 1945, for a radar training flight to Great Exuma, Bahamas. Their last radio position report was sent at 1:16 a.m., July 10, 1945, with a latitude/longitude of 25.22N 77.34W, near Providence Island, after which they were never heard from again. An extensive ten-day surface and air search, including a carrier sweep, found nothing.
- 1945: December 5, Flight 19 (five TBF Avengers) lost with 14 airmen, and later the same day PBM Mariner BuNo 59225 lost with 13 airmen while searching for Flight 19.
- 1948: January 30, Avro Tudor G-AHNP Star Tiger lost with six crew and 27 passengers, en route from Santa Maria Airport in the Azores to Kindley Field, Bermuda.
- 1948: December 28, Douglas DC-3 NC16002 lost with three crew and 36 passengers, en route from San Juan, Puerto Rico, to Miami, Florida.
- 1949: January 17, Avro Tudor G-AGRE Star Ariel lost with seven crew and 13 passengers, en route from Kindley Field, Bermuda, to Kingston Airport, Jamaica.
- 1965: June 9, A USAF C-119 Flying Boxcar of the 440th Troop Carrier Wing missing between Florida and Grand Turk Island The last call from the plane came from a point just north of Crooked Island, Bahamas, and 177 miles from Grand Turk Island. On July 18, 1965, debris from the plane was found on the beach of Gold Rock Cay just off the northeastern shore of Acklins Island.
- 1965: December 6, Private ERCO Ercoupe F01 lost with pilot and one passenger, en route from Ft. Lauderdale to Grand Bahamas Island.
- 2005: June 20, A Piper PA-23 disappeared between Treasure Cay Island, Bahamas and Fort Pierce, Florida. There were three people on board.
- 2017: February 23, The Turkish Airlines flight TK183 (an Airbus A330-200) was forced to change its direction from Havana, Cuba to Washington Dulles airport after some mechanical and electrical problems occurred over the triangle.
- 2026: October 3, Heartbeat 104, medical transport aircraft on the way from Bermuda to Boston vanished. Four Canadian nationals and two Bermudan nationals were onboard.After debris belonging to the plane was found the same evening, all passengers were presumed dead.

== Incidents at sea (13) ==
- 1800: USS Pickering, on course from Guadeloupe to Delaware, lost with 91 people on board. (Possibly lost in a gale)
- 1814: USS Wasp, last known position was the Caribbean, lost with 140 people on board. (Possibly lost in a storm)
- 1824: USS Wild Cat, on course from Cuba to Tompkins Island, lost with 14 people on board. (Lost in a gale with 31 on board)
- 1840: Rosalie, found abandoned. (Possibly the "Rossini" found derelict)
- 1881: According to legend, a sailing ship, the Ellen Austin, found a derelict vessel and placed a crew to sail the vessel to port. Two versions of what happened to the vessel are: the vessel was either lost in a storm or was found again without a crew. Lawrence David Kusche author of "The Bermuda Triangle Mystery-Solved" found no mention in 1880 or 1881 newspapers of this alleged incident-he did trace the legend to a book by Rupert Gould "The Stargazer Talks" published in 1943. The Ellen Austin did exist; a check from Lloyd's of London records proved the existence of Meta, built in 1854, and that in 1880, Meta was renamed Ellen Austin. There are no casualty listings for this vessel, or any vessel at that time, that would suggest a large number of missing men were placed on board a derelict that later disappeared although one website includes the alleged derelict vessel incident it does find that Rupert Gould talked about the legend on radio in the 1930s; likewise the website traces the derelict story to a June 1906 newspaper story-which claims the derelict ship incident took place in 1891; however the 1906 story does not give a reference of where this story came from.
- 1918: USS Cyclops, collier, left Barbados on March 4, lost with all 306 crew and passengers en route to Baltimore, Maryland.
- 1921: January 31, Carroll A. Deering, five-masted schooner, Captain W. B. Wormell, found aground and abandoned at Diamond Shoals, near Cape Hatteras, North Carolina.
- 1925: December 1, SS Cotopaxi, having departed Charleston, South Carolina two days earlier bound for Havana, Cuba, radioed a distress call reporting that the ship was sinking. She was officially listed as overdue on 31 December. In 1985 an unknown shipwreck was found off St Augustine, Florida; in 2020 it was identified as the remains of the SS Cotopaxi.
- 1941: USS Proteus (AC-9), lost with all 58 persons on board in heavy seas, having departed St. Thomas in the Virgin Islands with a cargo of bauxite on 23 November. The following month, her sister ship USS Nereus (AC-10) was lost with all 61 persons on board, having also departed St. Thomas with a cargo of bauxite, on 10 December. According to research by Rear Admiral George van Deurs, USN, who was familiar with this type of ship from their service in the USN, the acidic coal cargo would seriously erode the longitudinal support beams, making these aging and poorly constructed colliers extremely vulnerable to breaking up in heavy seas. They were both sister ships of the USS Cyclops.
- 1958: Revonoc. A 43-foot racing yawl was lost with owner Harvey Conover and four others aboard, between Key West and Miami in a hurricane. The only trace found was the Revonoc's 14-foot skiff, near Jupiter, Florida.
- 1967: December 22, Miami hotel owner and yachtsman Dan Burack set out on his cabin cruiser Witchcraft with a priest named Patrick Horgan. The ship was taken one mile off the Miami coastline so that Burack and Horgan could view the Christmas lights visible from the shore. That night, Burack radioed a distress call to the Coast Guard, informing them that the boat's propeller had struck something underwater, and that the vessel would need to be towed in. The Coast Guard requested that he send up a flare in roughly 20 minutes so that the boat could be more easily located. The official who received the call reportedly later noted that Burack did not seem too concerned about the Witchcraft, a boat that Burack had fitted with a special floatation device in its hull. When the Coast Guard arrived at the location from which Burack called, he, Horgan, and the Witchcraft were nowhere to be found. Over the following days, a search was conducted over hundreds of square miles of ocean, but the boat and its passengers were never found.
- 2015: Late July, two 14-year-old boys, Austin Stephanos, and Perry Cohen went on a fishing trip in their 19-foot boat. Despite the 15,000 square nautical mile wide search by the US Coast Guard, the pair's boat was found a year later off the coast of Bermuda, but the boys were never seen again.
- 2021: January 3. The 29ft Mako Cuddy Cabin boat, carrying 20 people disappears. It was travelling from Bimini in the Bahamas to Lake Worth Beach, Florida. After failing to locate family members onboard, a relative contacts the coast guard. Having searched for a day, the search is suspended without trace.

== Incidents on land ==
- 1969: August, Great Isaac Lighthouse (Bimini, Bahamas), during a hurricane, two lighthouse keepers disappeared and were never found.
