= Flight 967 =

Flight 967 may refer to the following commercial aviation accidents:

- National Airlines Flight 967, explosion on 16 November 1959
- Varig Flight 967, on 30 January 1979, it has never been found
- Armavia Flight 967, crashed on 3 May 2006
