= 2003 Angola Boeing 727 disappearance =

Stolen aircraft incident at Quatro de Fevereiro Airport

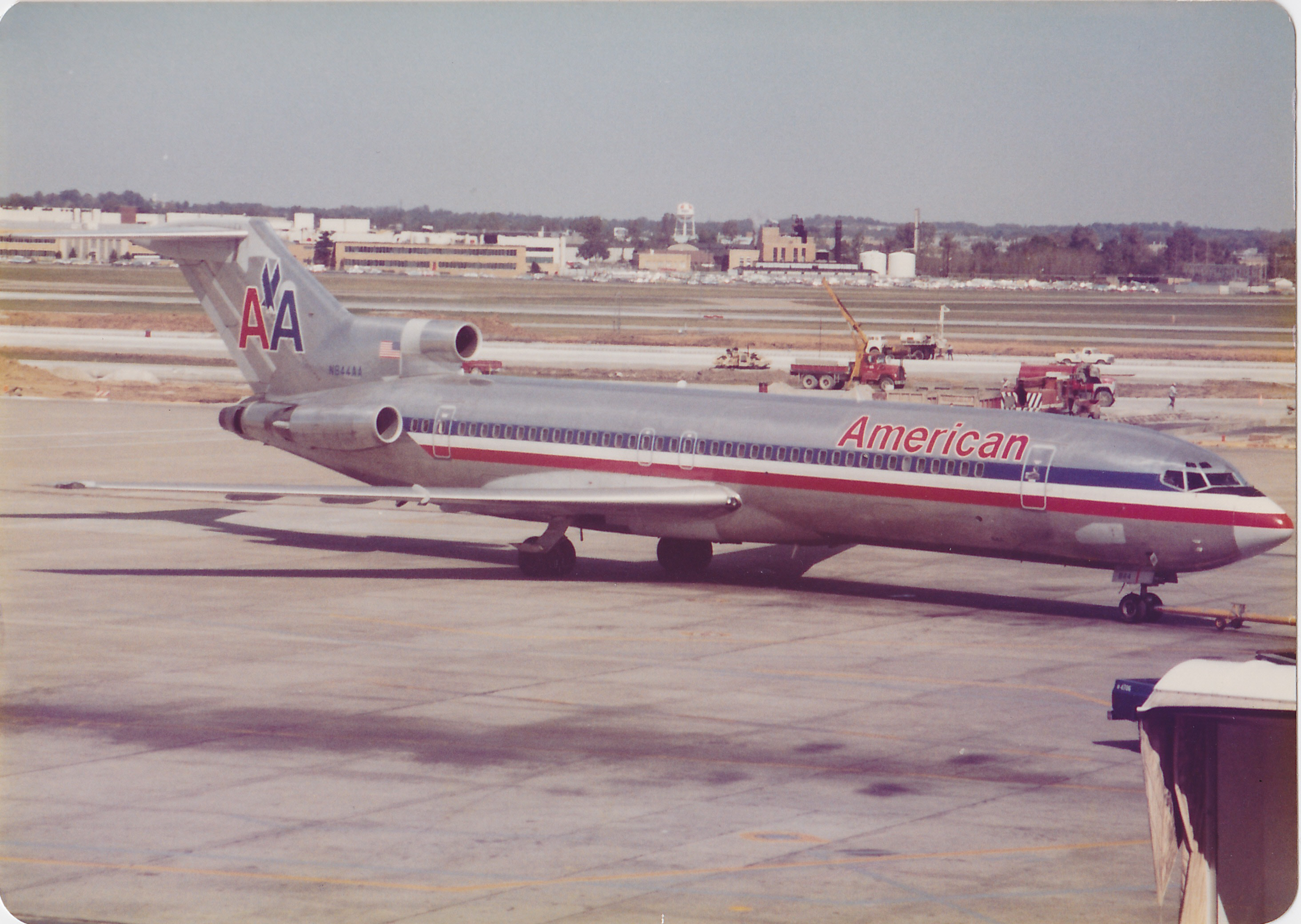
- N844AA, the aircraft involved in the disappearance, when still in service with American Airlines in 1981

Disappearance
- Date: 25 May 2003
- Summary: Disappearance; presumed theft, but whereabouts unknown
- Site: Quatro de Fevereiro Airport, Luanda, Luanda, Angola; 08°51′30″S 13°13′52″E

Aircraft
- Aircraft type: Boeing 727-223
- Operator: Aerospace Sales & Leasing
- Registration: N844AA
- Flight origin: Quatro de Fevereiro Airport, Luanda, Angola
- Occupants: 2 (unconfirmed)
- Passengers: 0
- Crew: 2
- Missing: 2

On 25 May 2003, a Boeing 727 airliner, registered as N844AA, was stolen at Quatro de Fevereiro Airport in Luanda, Angola, on the west-central coast of Southern Africa, prompting a worldwide search by law enforcement and intelligence agencies in the United States. No trace of the aircraft has ever been found.

== Background ==
The incident aircraft was a Boeing 727-223 airliner, serial number 20985, manufactured in 1975 and operated by American Airlines for 25 years until 2000. Its last owner was reportedly a US company called Aerospace Sales & Leasing. The aircraft had been grounded at Quatro de Fevereiro Airport in March 2002 and sat idle for fourteen months, accruing more than US$50,000 in unpaid airport fees. It was one of two aircraft there in the process of being converted for use by Nigerian IRS Airlines.

The United States Federal Bureau of Investigation (FBI) described the aircraft as "unpainted silver in color with a stripe of blue, white, and red. The aircraft was formerly in the air fleet of a major airline, but all of the passenger seats had been removed. It was outfitted to carry diesel fuel."

== Incident ==
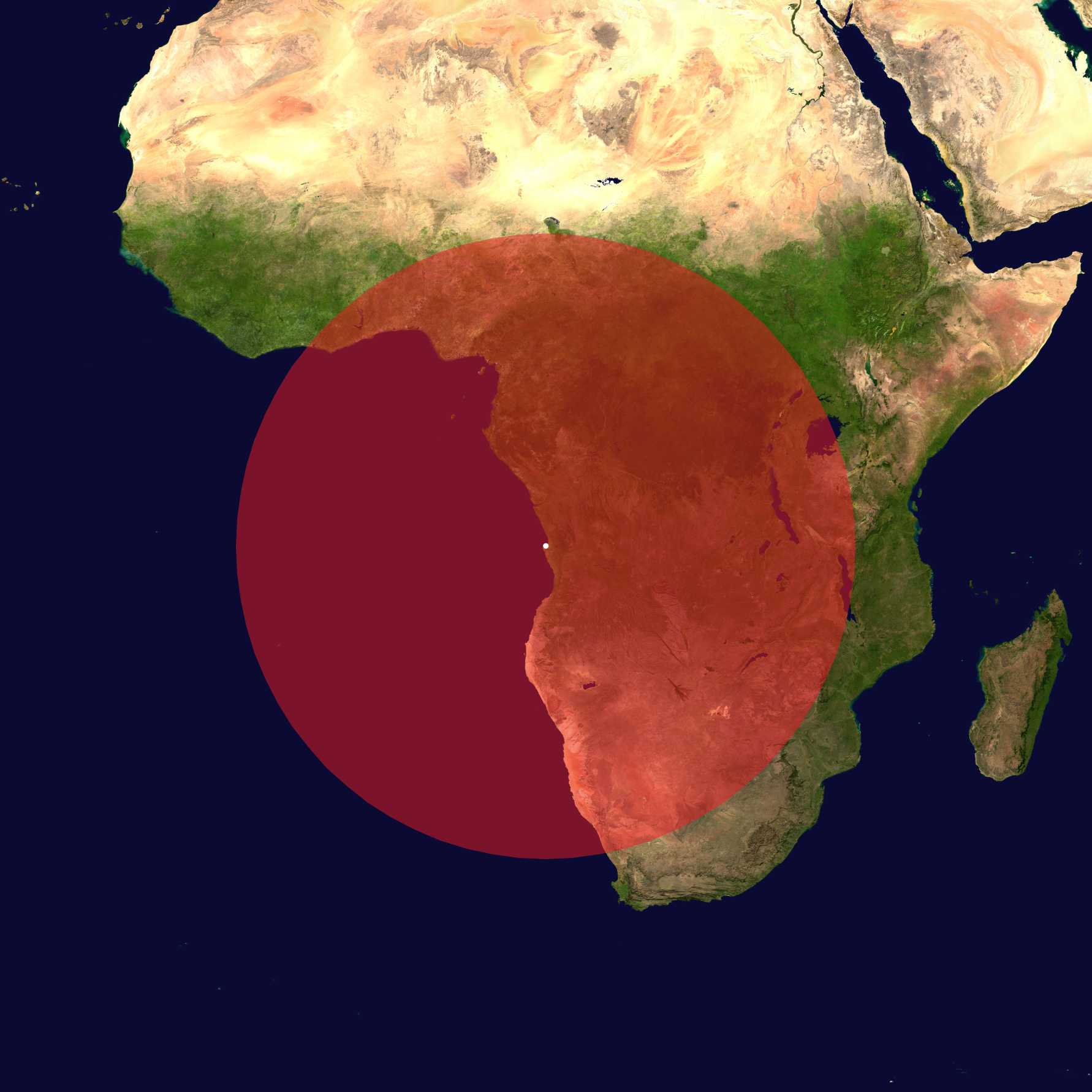
The approximate range of the 727 on the day it disappeared

On 25 May 2003, shortly before sunset (likely to be 17:00 WAT), it is believed that two men, Ben C. Padilla and John M. Mutantu, boarded the aircraft. Padilla was a pilot and flight engineer from the United States, while Mutantu was a French-Congolese citizen hired mechanic from the Republic of the Congo. A crew of three is required to fly a Boeing 727, and neither of the two were certified to fly it. U.S. authorities believed Padilla was at the controls. An airport employee reported seeing only one person on board the aircraft at the time; other airport officials stated two men boarded the aircraft before the incident.

The aircraft began taxiing without communicating with the control tower. It maneuvered erratically and entered a runway without clearance. Air traffic controllers tried to make contact, but there was no response. With no lights, the aircraft took off, heading southwest over the Atlantic Ocean before disappearing. Before the incident, the aircraft was filled with 53,000 litres (14,000 US gal) of fuel, giving it a range of about 2,400 kilometres (1,500 mi; 1,300 nmi). Neither the aircraft nor the two men were seen since, and no debris from the aircraft was found.

== Hypotheses ==
Padilla's sister, Benita Padilla-Kirkland, told the South Florida Sun-Sentinel in 2004 that her family suspected that he had been flying the aircraft and feared that he subsequently crashed somewhere in Africa or was being held against his will, a hypothesis shared by Aerospace Sales & Leasing president Maury Joseph, who had examined the plane two weeks before its disappearance. However, U.S. authorities suspected that the history of accounting fraud of Maury Joseph, the president of the company that owned the plane, played a part, believing that the plane's theft was either caused by a business feud or resulted from a scam.

In July 2003, a possible sighting of the missing aircraft was reported in Conakry, Guinea, but this claim was conclusively dismissed by the U.S. State Department.

An extensive article published in Air & Space/Smithsonian magazine in September 2010 was unable to draw any conclusions on the fate of the aircraft, despite research and interviews with persons knowledgeable of details surrounding the disappearance.

== See also ==
- List of missing aircraft
- List of people who disappeared mysteriously: post-1970
- 2018 Horizon Air Q400 incident, in which a Bombardier Dash 8-Q400 was stolen from Seattle-Tacoma International Airport and crashed into Ketron Island
- 1990 Faucett Perú Boeing 727 disappearance, another instance of a 727 disappearance
- Varig Flight 967
- Malaysia Airlines Flight 370
- Flying Tiger Line Flight 739
