= Wake Island Airfield =

US Air Force airfield located on Wake Island in the Pacific Ocean

- Wake Island in United States Minor Outlying Islands
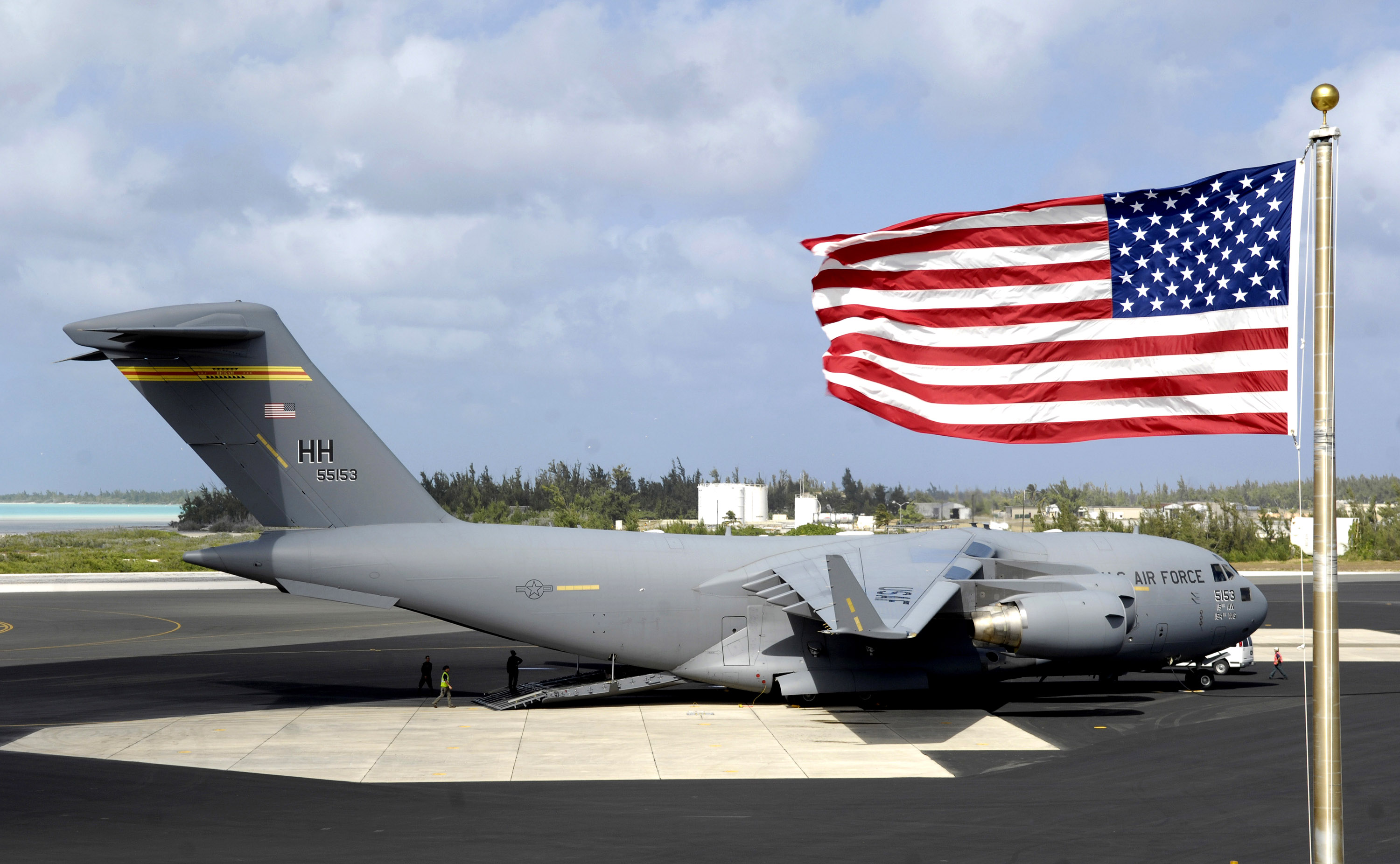
- A C-17A Globemaster III of the 15th Wing sits on the flight line at Wake Island Airfield in January 2008.

Site information
- Type: Military (United States Air Force) airfield
- Owner: Department of Defense
- Operator: US Air Force
- Controlled by: Pacific Air Forces (PACAF)
- Condition: Operational

Location
- Location in the Pacific Ocean
- Coordinates: 19°16′57″N 166°38′12″E
- Area: 2,600 acres (1,100 ha)

Site history
- Built: 1935
- In use: 1935 – present
- Battles/wars: Battle of Wake Island (1941)

Garrison information
- Garrison: Pacific Air Forces Regional Support Center

Airfield information
- Identifiers: IATA: AWK, ICAO: PWAK, FAA LID: AWK, WMO: 91246
- Elevation: 7 metres (23 ft) AMSL
Runways
Direction	Length and surface
10/28	3,000.4 metres (9,844 ft) Asphalt

Wake Island Airfield (IATA: AWK, ICAO: PWAK, FAA LID: AWK) is a U.S military air base located on Wake Island, which is known for the Battle of Wake Island during World War II. It is owned by the U.S. Air Force and operated by the 611th Air Support Group. The runway can be used for emergency landings by commercial jetliners flying transpacific routes and has been used in the past by airlines operating jet, turboprop, and prop aircraft on scheduled flights.

The airport was used until the 1970s as a refueling stopover for airliners crossing the Pacific Ocean, but longer range jet aircraft made this purpose fall out of favor as the airliners could fly direct without stopping. The earlier seaplane base at Wake was used for the first passenger and mail air transits across the Pacific Ocean in the late 1930s.

== History ==
=== Seaplane base ===
The first intention to build an air base surfaced in 1935, when Pan American World Airways (PAA) selected Wake Island as an intermediate support base for their seaplane routes to the Far East, especially the Philippines. A year prior, jurisdiction over Wake Island was passed to the Navy Department, which cooperated with PAA in updating topographical surveys, due to the potential military value of having a suitable mid-Pacific air base. It was a key element in the first South Pacific air ferry route to be used in flying aircraft from the U.S. to the Philippines. With the war, that route through the Japanese administered islands of the central Pacific was not possible, and Wake, along with the next stop, Guam, were lost, forcing the development of the route skirting Japanese held areas.

Between 5 and 29 May 1935, Pan American's air base construction vessel, North Haven, landed supplies and equipment on Wilkes Islet for eventual rehandling to Peale Islet which, because of its more suitable soil and geology, had been selected as the site for the PAA seaplane base. By the time of North Haven's return to Wake, after a month's voyage westward to Manila, the project was well underway, and, three months later, on 9 August 1935, a Pan American Sikorsky S-42 flying boat made the first aerial landing at the atoll.

From 1935 until 1940, when two typhoons swept Wake with resultant extensive damage to the now elaborately developed Pan American facilities, development and use of the base were steady but uneventful. A hotel was built, farm animals imported, and hydroponic truck farming commenced.

=== Naval air station ===
The seaplane base on Peale Island was too limited to support realistic military activity on the atoll, thus supporting plans for developing a full-scale military air base with a runway for land-based aircraft. On 26 December 1940, implementing the Hepburn Board's recommendations, a pioneer party of 80 men and 2,000 short tons (1,800 t) of equipment sailed for Wake Island from Oahu. This advanced detachment established a naval air station on Wake Island. Construction plans included a runway to be used by F4F Wildcat airplanes and commercial airliners of greater size, which could not land on water. Support craft arrived at Wake on 9 January 1941, laid to off Wilkes Islet, and the next day commenced landing naval supplies and advance base equipment for the development of the base. The company contracted to build the base was Morrison-Knudsen Co. (later acquired by Washington Group International) which, together with seven other companies, built many of the U.S. naval bases throughout the Pacific Ocean. During the construction, several military personnel were already deployed. The Battle of Wake Island began nearly a year later. Wake Island was held by Japan until September 1945.

=== Postwar service ===
Map of Wake Island

In 1950, Wake Island was a stop on Pan Am's round-the-world service between San Francisco and New York City, with the airline operating double-decker Boeing 377 Stratocruiser propliners into the airfield. Westbound Pan Am flights continued on to Guam, Tokyo, and other destinations in Asia before proceeding to Europe and New York City while eastbound flights operated a Henderson Field (Midway Atoll)-Honolulu-San Francisco routing.

During the Korean War, the airfield was the site of a face-to-face meeting between President Harry Truman and General Douglas MacArthur in October 1950, which presaged Truman's dismissal of MacArthur in April 1951.

By 1969, Wake Island was a scheduled stop on a round trip transpacific flight operated by Pan Am between San Francisco and Saigon in the former country of South Vietnam. This passenger service was operated twice a week with a Boeing 707 intercontinental jetliner. These flights also served Honolulu and Guam nonstop from Wake Island.

At the same time, Pan Am was operating daily all cargo flights into Wake Island with a Boeing 707 jet freighter. Depending on the day of the week, this all cargo service was flown into Wake Island on a westbound route that included New York City, Los Angeles, Travis Air Force Base in northern California (which was a flag stop for military cargo and mail), San Francisco and Honolulu. The Pan Am 707 jet freighter operated continuing all cargo service westbound from Wake Island to Guam, Tokyo, Saigon, and Hong Kong.

Pan Am subsequently discontinued all flights into Wake Island by the early 1970s, thus ending many years of passenger and cargo air service. Wake Island was one of the smallest destinations, population-wise, to receive scheduled Pan Am jet service. A Pan Am Boeing 747 visited the airfield in November 1985 on a transpacific tour to commemorate the first China Clipper flight.

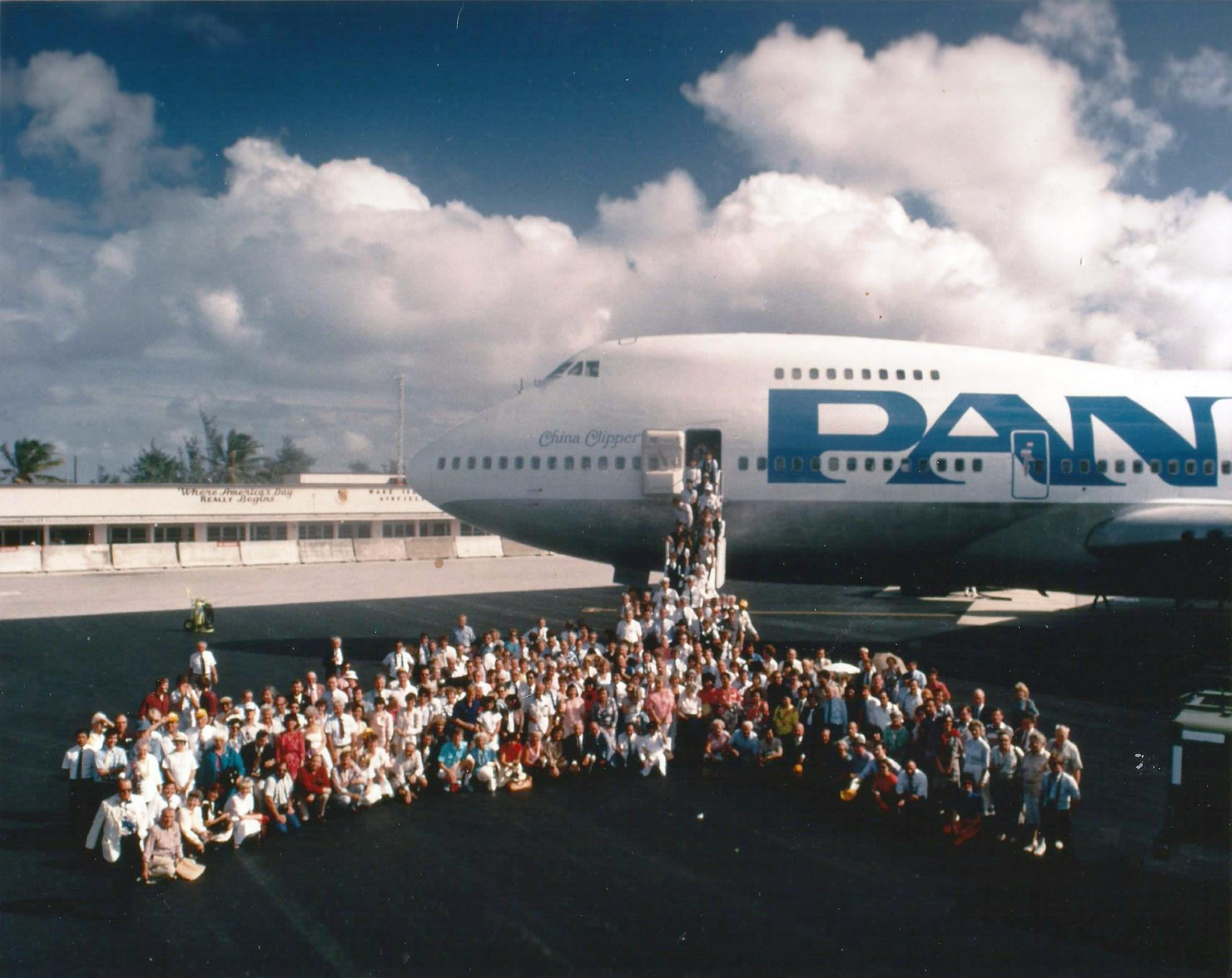
Passengers and crew of Pan Am's China Clipper II Boeing 747 at Wake Island during a 1985 trip across the Pacific to commemorate the 50th anniversary of the first China Clipper flight

Japan Airlines (JAL) used both Wake Island and Honolulu as stops on its initial Tokyo-San Francisco service flown with Douglas DC-6 prop aircraft in the mid-1950s. The Wake Island technical stop on this route was discontinued with the introduction of Douglas DC-8 jetliners by JAL.

British Overseas Airways Corporation (BOAC, which subsequently became British Airways) also used Wake Island as a refueling stop. During the late 1950s, BOAC operated Bristol Britannia turboprop aircraft on their twice-a-week westbound service between the U.K. and Asia via the U.S. The routing of these flights was London-New York-San Francisco-Honolulu-Wake Island-Tokyo-Hong Kong. The Wake Island stop was discontinued when BOAC replaced the Britannia propjet with Boeing 707 aircraft on the same route as part of their around-the-world services.

Transocean Air Lines, a U.S. air carrier based in Oakland, California, was operating Lockheed Constellation propliner service into the airport in 1958 on a routing of Oakland-Honolulu-Wake Island-Guam-Okinawa with round trip flights being operated twice a week.

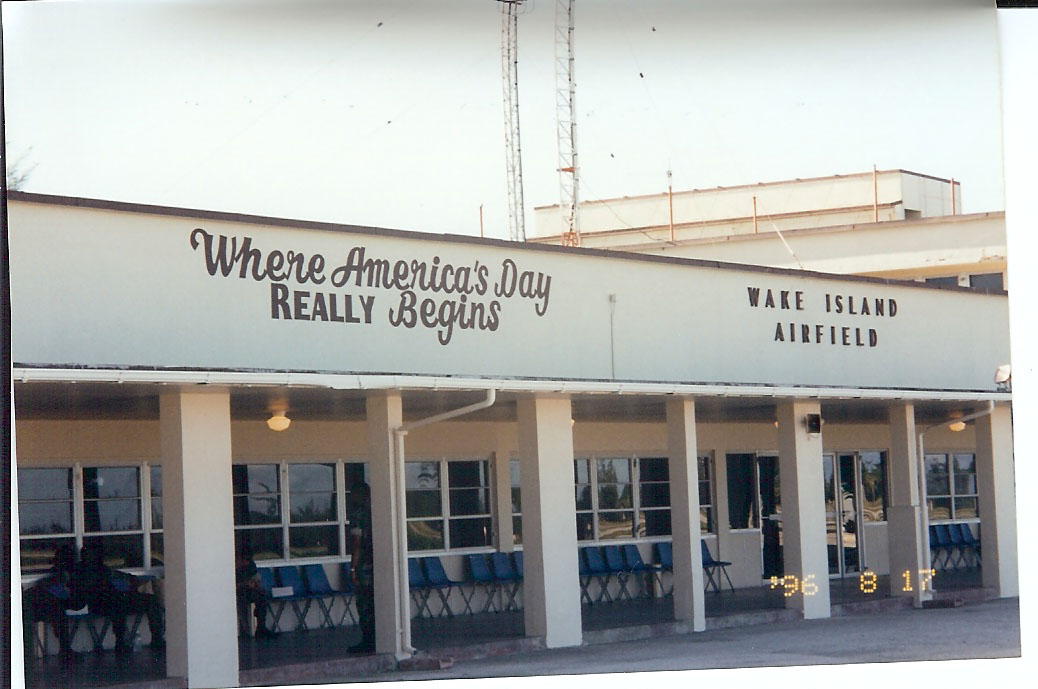
Wake Island Air Terminal Building

Real Transportes Aereos, a Brazilian airline, also used the airfield as a technical stop for its flights between South America and Japan during the early 1960s. In 1961, Real was operating weekly Douglas DC-6B round trip service with a routing of São Paulo-Rio de Janeiro-Manaus-Bogota-Mexico City-Los Angeles-Honolulu-Wake Island-Tokyo.

Another airline that operated on Wake Island was Philippine Airlines with Douglas DC-8 jetliners on a daily westbound service from San Francisco and Honolulu to Manila during the early 1970s. The airfield was a technical stop for fuel for this Philippine Airlines flight as the DC-8 did not have the range to fly nonstop from Honolulu to Manila.

=== Super typhoon Ioke ===
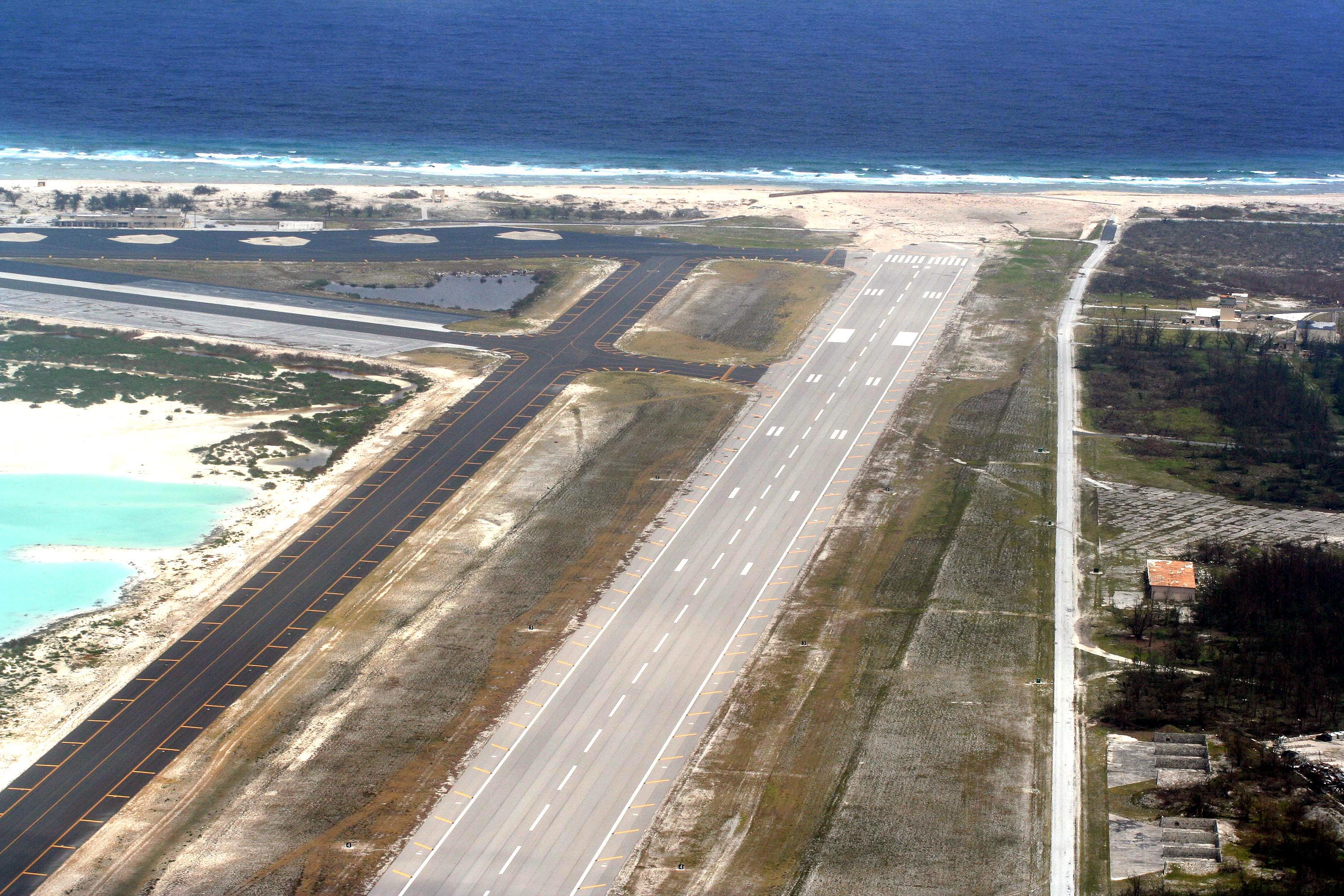
Wake Island airport runway after Typhoon Ioke

On 31 August 2006, the super typhoon Ioke (class 5) struck Wake Island. Significant damage was expected to all structures and infrastructure, including the runway. Members of the 36th Contingency Response Group at Andersen Air Force Base in Guam were estimating large costs to repair the airfield facility. On 8 September 2006, 16 members of the Group arrived at Wake to make the initial assessments and found that the runway and taxiways were still in an acceptable operational condition, with just a requirement to clear debris. Other structures were damaged and were repaired in five days. With the base up and running again, another 53 members arrived by air to support continued reconstruction.

=== 21st century ===
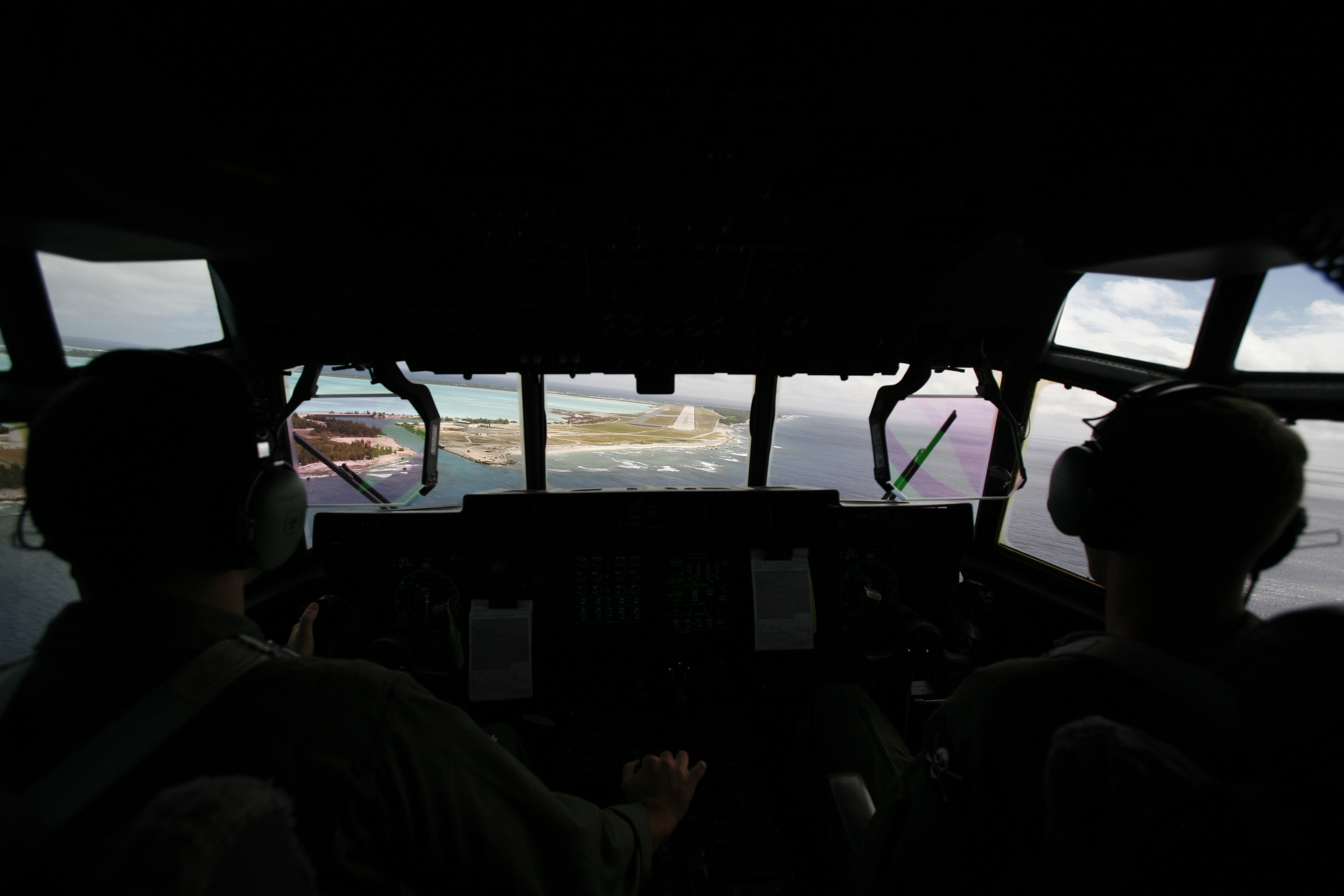
C-130 on approach to the Wake airfield

In May 2014, a Delta Air Lines Boeing 767-300ER conducted an emergency landing at Wake Island after encountering an issue with one engine. The flight departed from Honolulu bound for Nagoya, Japan. After landing, passengers were transferred to another aircraft.

On 12 December 2016, a China Airlines Airbus A330-300 with engine problems landed at Wake Island. The flight was heading from Honolulu to Tokyo.

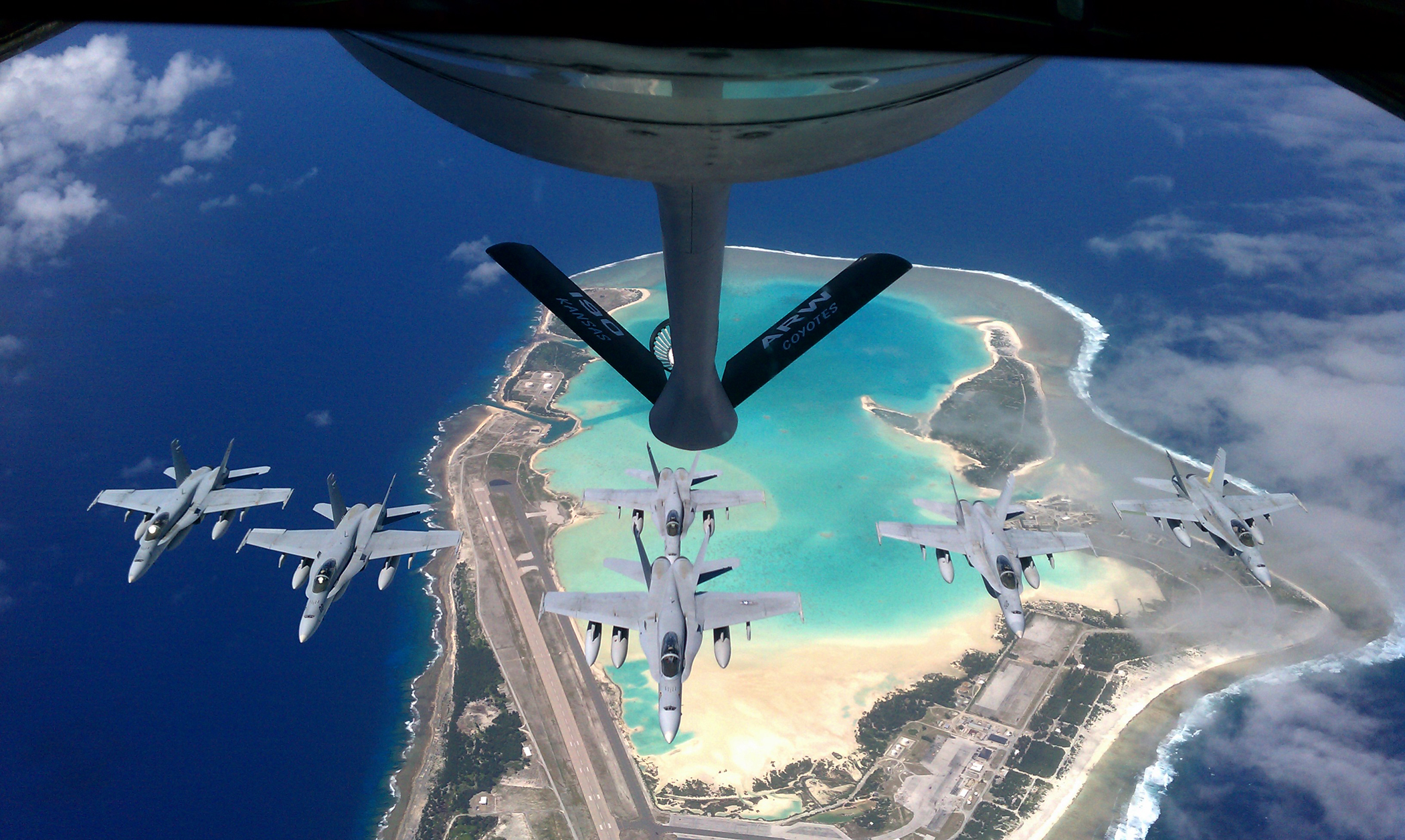
F/A-18 Hornets as seen from an air-to-air refueling aircraft over Wake

As of 2018, four active duty Air Force airmen and around 100 contractors were stationed at Wake Island, supporting refueling stops and missile defense system development and testing. The airfield can support about twice as many personnel during transpacific military deployments.

In 2020-21, the runway and support facilities were modernized, including lighting, drainage, surface repairs, and other enhancements.

== Airlines and destinations ==
Airlines	Destinations
Air Transport International	Charter: Travis AFB, Honolulu
Mid-Pacific Jets	Charter: Honolulu

== Accidents and incidents ==
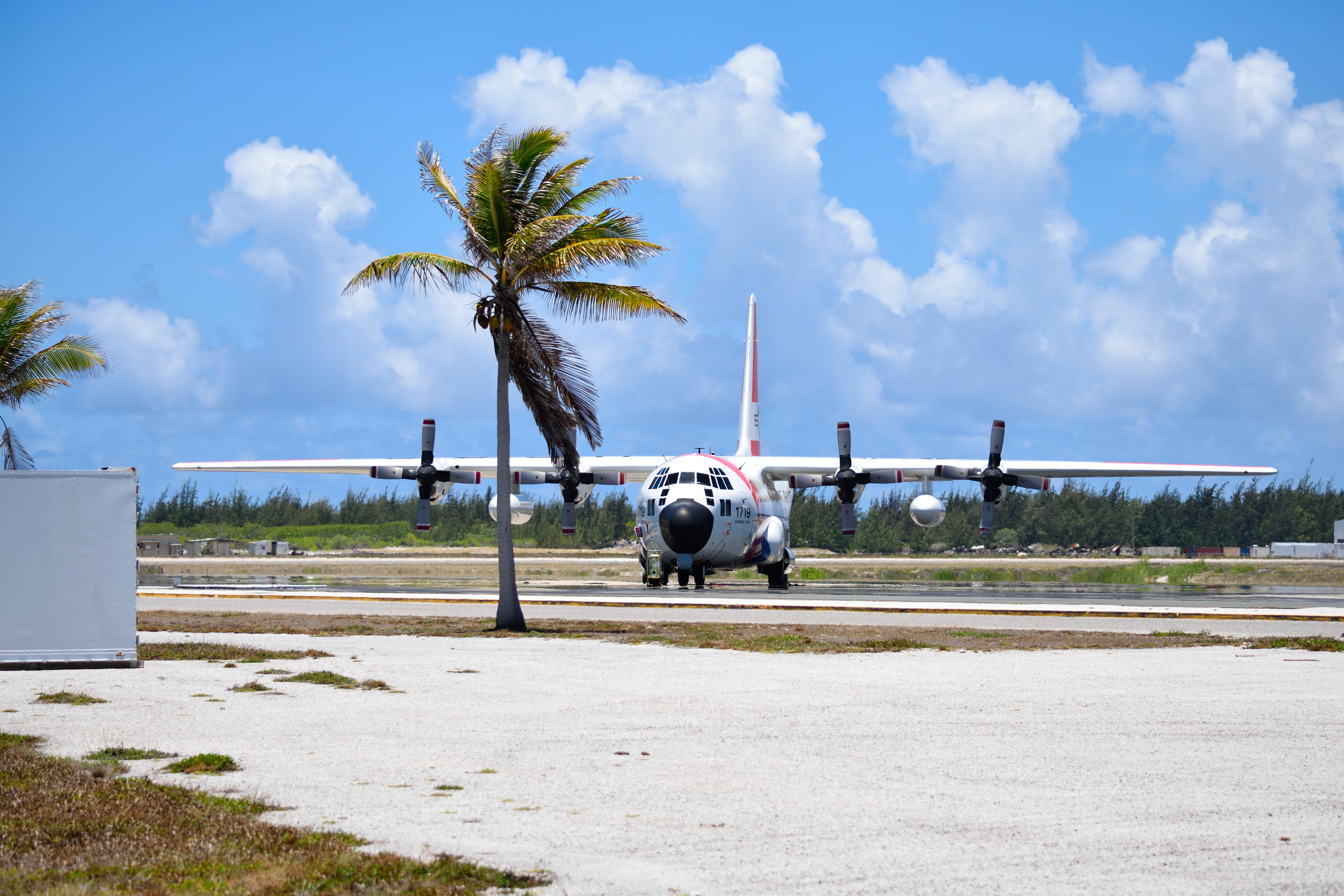
C-130 at Wake Island Airfield, 2015

- On 15 November 1948, a Douglas DC-6 (PI-C291) of Philippine Airlines overran the runway on landing and was damaged beyond repair. There were no fatalities.
- On 11 January 1965, a Douglas C-133A Cargomaster (54-0140) of the USAF crashed 4.5 km (2.8 miles) off of Wake Island during night hours at 500 feet altitude on initial climb for Kadena, killing all 6 occupants.
- On 19 April 1967, a Boeing KC-135A Stratotanker (55-3140) of the USAF exploded while the landing gear was being serviced; the plane was damaged beyond repair and no one was killed.
- On 24 September 1968, a Boeing KC-135A Stratotanker (55-3133) of the USAF was flying from Andersen to Hickam but diverted to Wake due to engine issues; during final approach the plane contacted the surface of the water, bounced onto the east end of the runway and burst into flames, killing 11 passengers of the 56 occupants. The plane was carrying 509th Bomb Wing personnel back from U-Tapao, Thailand to California.
- On 21 June 1977, a Lockheed EC-130Q Hercules (156176) of the US Navy crashed into the sea 1.5 km (0.9 miles) from Wake at 21:30 during initial climb for Agana, killing all 16 occupants.
