= Disappearance of Perry Cohen and Austin Stephanos =

2015 missing person case in Florida, United States

Perry Cohen
- Born: January 30, 2001
- Disappeared: July 24, 2015 (aged 14); Atlantic Ocean off of Tequesta, Florida
- Status: Missing for 11 years and 25 days
- Height: 5 ft 2 in (1.57 m)

Austin Stephanos
- Born: December 1, 2000
- Disappeared: July 24, 2015 (aged 14); Atlantic Ocean off of Tequesta, Florida
- Status: Missing for 11 years and 25 days
- Height: 5 ft 2 in (1.57 m)

Perry Cohen (born January 30, 2001) and Austin Stephanos (born December 1, 2000) went missing from Tequesta, Florida on July 24, 2015. The two departed together for a fishing trip and did not return after a storm hit the area. They are both believed to have died in this storm.

== Background ==
Perry Cohen and Austin Stephanos were 14 year old friends and both avid fishermen. According to their families, the two boys went boating together frequently, often without adults, but would check in with their parents regularly. Stephanos's grandfather told reporters that Austin had operated the boat about twenty times before, and that family members were comfortable with him operating the boat. About a week prior to the boys' disappearance, Austin had been stopped by a Marine Patrol Officer for a routine check, and all safety equipment mandated by Florida law was aboard the boat at that time.

On July 23, 2015, Perry Cohen sent a message to another friend via Instagram that read: "Me and Austin are crossing to the Bahamas tomorrow. Come with us, we wouldn't check in." Another friend reportedly spoke to Stephanos about plans to sail to the Bahamas prior to July 24, however Stephanos told him that the weather was too rough. Cohen reportedly asked his step-father that night if he could borrow his GPS to use on Stephanos's boat.

== Disappearance ==
Cohen spent the night of July 23, 2015 at Stephanos's home. Cohen had told a friend that the two of them were planning to go fishing in the inlet the following morning. On the morning of July 24, 2015, Cohen and Stephanos traveled to the Jupiter Island marina to go fishing on a nineteen-foot, single engine 1978 SeaCraft that was registered to Stephanos's mother. They were last seen at the Jib Yacht Club and Marina where they spent about $100 USD on gas. Stephanos texted his parents around 11:25 AM. They left the marina sometime before noon.

Shortly after they left, as a line of thunderstorms moved towards the area, the National Weather Service issued a special marine warning advising that heavy rains and winds exceeding 40 mph may reach the inlet. Stephanos's cellphone was disconnected from the Internet around 1:15 PM. His last social media posts were from his Snapchat account, with one of the posts being a photo of the boys on the boat with fishing poles and a message stating: "Peace Out Jup". Friends of Cohen and Stephanos claim the message meant the boys were planning to go to the Bahamas. A friend told reporters that another post from that day from Stephanos's account was a video of the fast-moving storm headed towards the boat along with the text, "We're f-cked".

== Search efforts ==
A fund was created to pay for private searches for the boys and within a few hours had raised thousands of dollars. Dozens of people, including NFL Hall-of-Famer Joe Namath, joined the search and participants followed shorelines and beaches looking for any debris washed ashore.

Due to the vast sea area to be searched, multiple boats and aircraft were used to search for the missing boys. A Coast Guard C-130 airplane, a Miami helicopter crew, an HR 144 plane, two US Customs and Border Protection planes and two Coast Guard Cutters were used along with multiple private boaters and pilots offering their help. The search was made difficult as it was determined that the boat was not equipped with an emergency positioning beacon or any other safety equipment, such as a radio or GPS.

The boat that the boys were operating was originally discovered on July 26, 2015 near Daytona Beach, Florida and the Coast Guard attached a data-marker buoy to the boat and left to continue to search for Cohen and Stephanos. It was re-discovered on March 18, 2016 about one hundred miles from Bermuda. An iPhone and other personal effects were found on board the boat. The search for the boys was called off on July 31, 2015.

== Investigation ==
Due to the storm that occurred shortly after the boys left the marina, the boys were declared missing; they were generally believed to be victims of the violent storm. However, with the rediscovery of the boat on March 18, 2016 the parents of Cohen believed that there was potentially additional information on the fate of the children. The boat was discovered to have the ignition and the battery switched to the off position, which could potentially indicate foul play.

However, as there is no other evidence of foul play, all the items found in the boat were turned over to the boys' families, without investigation into the objects. Cohen's parents filed a lawsuit against an iPhone being returned to Stephanos's parents as they felt it would break the chain of custody and any evidence would be tainted by potential bias.

== Legal ==
In 2016, Cohen's parents filed a lawsuit to prevent an iPhone that was discovered in the boat being returned to Stephanos's family. Cohen's parents argued that the phone being returned to Stephanos's family would potentially taint any evidence found on the iPhone. Despite multiple motions for an emergency injunction against the Stephanos family and the Florida Fish and Wildlife Conservation Commission, the phone was turned over to the Stephanos family. It was later sent to Apple per a judge's order to be investigated by the company for the court.

In 2017, Cohen's family filed a wrongful death lawsuit against Stephanos's family alleging that Stephanos and other family members were negligent for allowing the children to venture into the Atlantic Ocean with an unworthy vessel and no communication devices on board. Specific charges were filed against Stephanos's father, William "Blu" Stephanos, who the Cohen's alleged delayed rescue efforts by proper authorities by undertaking his own search instead of calling 911 when he learned of the boys' disappearance from his ex-wife.

In September 2020, a Palm Beach County judge ruled that William "Blu" Stephanos was not liable in the disappearance of his son and Cohen. The judge stated that the personal search did not increase the boys' risk of harm, and that the risk the boys faced were the dangerous conditions at sea.

== Vigils and memorials ==
Shortly after their disappearance, a makeshift memorial was created out of seashells and candles to honor the boys. Artist Shepard Fairey painted a mural of Cohen at Jupiter High School in 2017. A statue to honor the boys and others lost at sea was dedicated on July 22, 2021, at the south jetty of the Jupiter Inlet memorial site. A combined effort by the AustinBlu Foundation and the Jupiter Inlet District, the bronze statue was created by a West Palm Beach artist’s studio, Robert St. Croix Sculpture Studio & Foundry. The memorial does not feature the missing boys. Instead, a pair of life-size figures, one male and one female, stand looking out over the inlet. The female, wearing a wind-blown dress, shades her eyes with her hands while the male’s left hand rests supportively on her upper back. According to Blu Stephanos, the statue not only represents everyone who has lost someone at sea but also commemorates the Jupiter-Tequesta community that assisted in searching for Austin and Perry and supported their families.

A teak plaque, crafted by Jupiter resident Craig Brown, is attached to the railing at the jetty. It is topped with a clear lighthouse with a flashing LED light. An inscription reads, "Keep the Light Shining for Austin & Perry.”

The fifth anniversary of their disappearance was marked in 2020, with both families engaging in separate memorials due to the ongoing legal battle.

== Legacy ==
Both families set up foundations in honor of their sons. The Perry J. Cohen Foundation has donated to local organizations and schools with the Jupiter High School's new Wetlands Laboratory named after Cohen. The laboratory works with students in an outdoor environment to teach art, photography, environment, and agriculture students. The AustinBlu Foundation has held annual fishing tournaments and helped the "Beacon Bill" to be signed into state law in 2016, which incentivizes the use of an EPIRB by discounting boat registration by 25%.

== See also ==
- List of people who disappeared mysteriously: post-1970
