= 1953 Skyways Avro York disappearance =

Aircraft disappearance

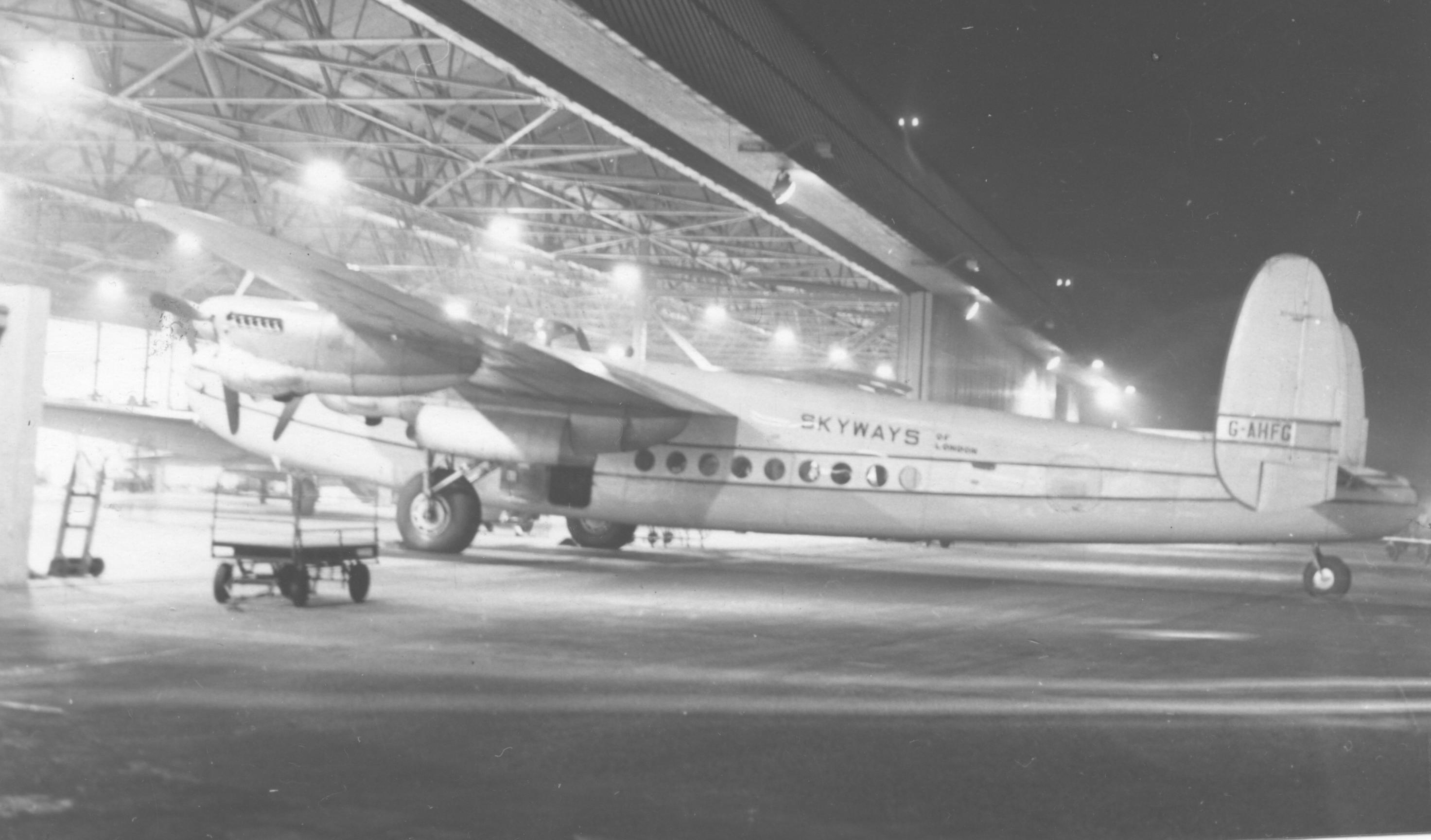
- Sister aircraft G-AHFG in 1952

Incident
- Date: 2 February 1953
- Summary: Unexplained disappearance
- Site: North Atlantic

Aircraft
- Aircraft type: Avro York
- Operator: Skyways
- Registration: G-AHFA
- Flight origin: Stansted Airport, Stansted, United Kingdom
- Destination: Jamaica
- Occupants: 39
- Passengers: 33
- Crew: 6
- Fatalities: 39
- Survivors: 0

On 2 February 1953, an Avro York four-engined piston airliner registered G-AHFA of Skyways disappeared over the North Atlantic on a flight from the United Kingdom to Jamaica. The aircraft had 39 occupants including 13 children.

It is one of the deadliest aircraft disappearances.

== Accident ==
The Avro York was a military trooping flight for the British Air Ministry from Stansted Airport in the United Kingdom to Jamaica with six crew and 33 passengers, including soldiers with their families. The aircraft had stopped at Lajes Field in the Azores and departed at 23:25 on 1 February 1953 for Gander Airport in Newfoundland. The aircraft transmitted Positional Operational Meteorological Reports at approximately one-hour intervals from 00:10 to 04:25 on 2 February. At 04:10 the aircraft position was given as 44°32'N 41°38'W. At 05:31 Gander heard an Urgency signal from the aircraft giving a position of 46°15′N 46°31′W. The urgency signal was followed by a distress message "SOS, SOS, SOS DE G-A" the message stopped abruptly and no further communications from the aircraft were heard.

An extensive air and sea search failed to find any trace of the aircraft or the 39 occupants. The following day (3 February) United States Coast Guard cutter Campbell reported several large oil patches and dye markers about 120 miles south-west of the last reported position of the aircraft; the Campbell reported that the search area had snow squalls.

== Aircraft ==
The Avro York (registration: G-AHFA) had been built in 1946 and had completed 6,418 hours total flying time. It had a valid certificate of airworthiness issued three days before the disappearance and had been completely overhauled in November 1952. The aircraft was owned by the Lancashire Aircraft Corporation and operated by Skyways.

The aircraft was first registered to the Ministry of Supply and Aircraft Production on 20 March 1946. It was registered to British South American Airways (BSAA) on 20 August 1946 and operated with the name "Star Dale". It was sold to British Overseas Airways Corporation (BOAC) on 3 September 1949. BOAC sold the aircraft in 1951 and it was registered to the Lancashire Aircraft Corporation on 11 December 1951.

== Investigation ==
A public inquiry was opened in London at Holborn Town Hall on 2 July 1953 to consider possible causes of the loss of the York. The Solicitor General representing The Crown absolved the crew from blame; he also ruled out sabotage or contaminated fuel. On the second day the Chief Investigation Officer of the Accidents Investigation Branch (AIB) gave an opinion that it may have been an uncontrollable fire in one of the aircraft's engines.

The report of the inquiry was issued on 3 December 1953 and stated that the cause was unascertainable. The court found the loss was not contributed by any wrongful act or default of any person or party. It was concluded that the urgency signal was transmitted at a normal speed and possibly not an indication that urgent assistance was required, quickly followed by a hasty distress signal indicated that whatever the trouble it developed in a sudden and violent manner.
