= 1990 Faucett Perú Boeing 727 disappearance =

Airliner disappearance

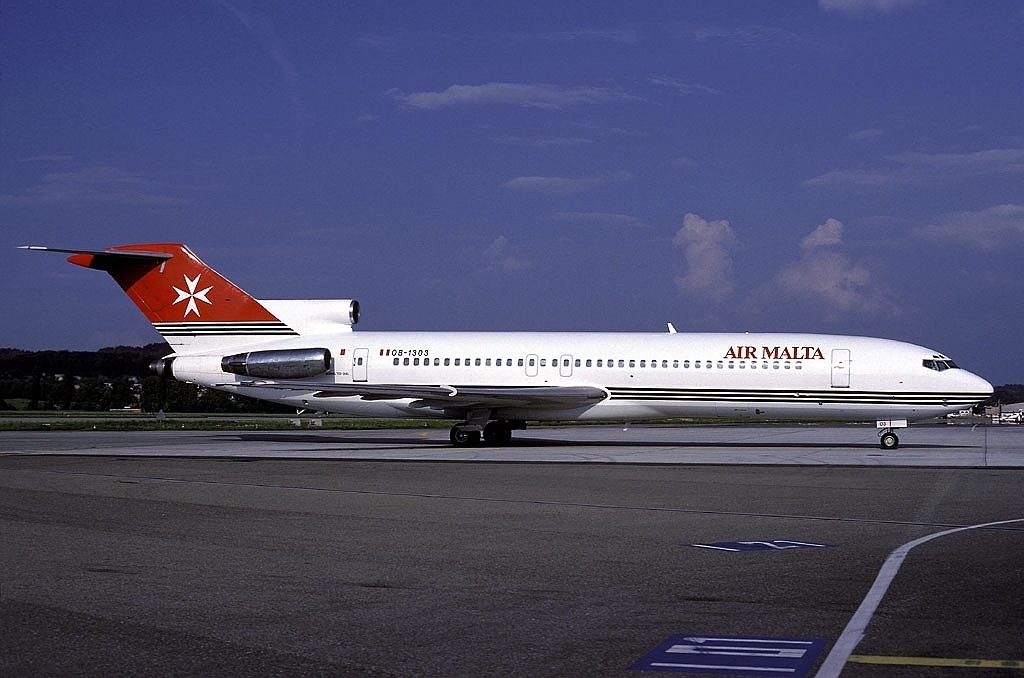
- OB-1303, the aircraft involved in the accident, in May 1990

Disappearance
- Date: 11 September 1990
- Summary: Disappearance; Pilot navigational error leading to fuel exhaustion; subsequent ditching
- Site: Approximately 180 miles (160 nmi; 290 km) southeast of Cape Race, Newfoundland, Canada

Aircraft
- Aircraft type: Boeing 727–247
- Operator: Faucett Perú (transferral flight from Air Malta)
- Registration: OB-1303
- Flight origin: Malta International Airport, Luqa, Malta
- 1st stopover: London, England or Milan Malpensa Airport Italy (Note: It is not known what London airport was used, if any. According to some contemporary sources, the first stopover was at Milan, not London.)
- 2nd stopover: Keflavík International Airport, Keflavík, Iceland
- 3rd stopover: Gander International Airport, Gander, Newfoundland, Canada
- Last stopover: Miami International Airport, Miami, Florida, U.S.
- Destination: Jorge Chávez International Airport, Lima, Peru
- Occupants: 16 (Note: Originally, it was reported that a total of eighteen people were on board the plane at the time of its disappearance, but Faucett officials later changed the number to fifteen because it was believed that three people had left the plane when it refuelled in Iceland. Records now show that there was a total of sixteen people on board the aircraft when it disappeared.)
- Passengers: 10
- Crew: 6
- Fatalities: 16 (presumed)
- Survivors: 0 (presumed)

On 11 September 1990, a Faucett Perú Boeing 727 airliner, registered OB-1303, disappeared in an area of the Atlantic Ocean approximately 180 miles (160 nmi; 290 km) southeast of Cape Race, Newfoundland, Canada. The aircraft was being ferried back from Malta to Peru after having been leased to Air Malta, and had six crewmembers on board as well as ten passengers consisting of airline employees and their families. The last contact with the crew was a distress message stating that the aircraft had run out of fuel and that they were preparing to ditch. The aircraft was hundreds of miles off course at the time. Nothing more was heard from the flight, and no trace of the aircraft or any of the occupants has since been found.

== Background ==
The aircraft involved was a 21-year-old Boeing 727-247, registered OB-1303, which first flew in 1969. The aircraft had been leased to European carrier Air Malta for the summer season of 1990 by its owner Faucett Perú, and on the day of the disappearance was being ferried back from Malta to Peru at the end of its lease.

On board were six crewmembers and ten passengers consisting of airline employees and their families. The employees included mechanics and other ground crew personnel who had been working in Malta. It is believed an infant was on board and up to four women. All of those on board were Peruvian nationals.

The aircraft was scheduled to make refuelling stops during its journey at London in the United Kingdom (or possibly Milan Malpensa Airport in Italy); Keflavík International Airport in Iceland; Gander International Airport in Newfoundland, Canada; and finally Miami International Airport in the United States before arriving at Lima International Airport in Peru. The aircraft made its first two stops without incident, with the disappearance occurring on the Keflavík-Gander leg.

== Incident ==
Location of the last transmission (approximate) and the departure/destination airports

At around noon, en route from Malta, the aircraft landed at Keflavík International Airport to refuel. The aircraft received weather information and took on about 20 tonnes (44,000 lb) of fuel.

Having refuelled at Keflavík, the aircraft left Iceland at 13:16 local time without incident. The flight to Gander was estimated to take around 3 hours and 38 minutes. The flight had requested permission to climb to 28,000 ft (8,500 m), first climbing to 24,000 ft (7,300 m) and 27,000 ft (8,200 m). At 14:50, the aircraft left Icelandic air traffic control.

However, the aircraft did not arrive in Gander at its expected arrival time. Thirty minutes after it was due in Gander, at 15:20, two nearby flights, TWA Flight 851 and American Airlines Flight 35, picked up a transmission from the aircraft declaring a low-fuel emergency. The pilots had stated that they were at 10,000 ft (3,000 m) and were preparing to ditch the aircraft into the Atlantic Ocean. The message was relayed by the two U.S. aircraft to air traffic control. This was the last message received from the aircraft.

The aircraft's last known location was around 250 mi (220 nmi; 400 km) southeast of the city of St. John's, Newfoundland, and 180 mi (160 nmi; 290 km) southeast of Newfoundland at its nearest point. This suggested that the aircraft had unknowingly strayed off course, since this was far from the planned route to Gander. It is presumed that no one survived the ditching.

== Search ==
After not hearing from the flight for hours, a rescue attempt was launched by the Canadian Armed Forces, with three CP-140 Aurora airplanes and three CH-113 Labrador helicopters being dispatched to the area where the plane was last heard from. Two Canadian Coast Guard vessels, two fisheries patrol vessels and two naval destroyers were also dispatched to the search area. A weak signal was reportedly detected from the jet's emergency transmitter by a satellite after radio contact with the plane was lost, although an exact location of the signal's source could not be identified. Authorities also stated that "unusual signals" had been picked up by satellites, and did not know if these unexplained signals had come from a plane or a life raft. In January 1991, the National Transportation Safety Board reported that the aircraft was not equipped with an emergency locator transmitter (ELT) which would have activated upon any impact.

It was assumed that the aircraft had ditched at sea and could be found floating in the water. The weather at the time of the disappearance was described as good and the seas were calm, and it was thought that the plane had the ability to withstand a landing at sea and float for several hours. Visibility was also found to be good at the presumed crash site. The plane was reportedly equipped with emergency lifeboats, lifevests and other safety devices to be used in the event of a ditching.

Despite the search effort, the search aircraft reported finding no trace of the missing plane, and nothing was ever found from the flight. Officials stated that the search was hampered by the plane's white colour, which made it difficult to spot it from the air.

== Aftermath ==
Originally, it was reported that a total of 18 people were on board the plane at the time of its disappearance; however, Faucett officials later changed the number to 15 because it was believed that three people had left the plane when it refuelled in Iceland. Records now show that there were a total of 16 people on board the aircraft when it disappeared.

Transport Canada spokesperson Lily Abbass stated in the aftermath that the jet was off course at the time of last contact, and officials speculated that the aircraft "got lost" during its journey. The jet had strayed hundreds of miles from its intended route to Gander, and a reason for this could not be established. Despite the pilots reporting that they did not have enough fuel, officials at Keflavík insisted there was no problem during the stopover there. Officials from the Transportation Safety Board of Canada (TSB) stated that they believed the aircraft had indeed ditched in the sea.

An investigation into the disappearance by the Peruvian government was ongoing as of January 1991, but its findings are unknown. According to the Hindustan Times, the accident was attributed to poor pilot planning.

The story of the aircraft's disappearance briefly resurfaced after the much-publicised disappearance of another airliner in 2014, Malaysia Airlines Flight 370, which vanished with 239 passengers on board and most likely crashed into the Indian Ocean.

Faucett Peru ceased operations in 1997 after several years of financial struggle.

== See also ==
- 2003 Angola Boeing 727 disappearance – another Boeing 727 that disappeared after being stolen
- List of missing aircraft
- List of people who disappeared mysteriously at sea
