= 1948 Airborne Transport DC-3 disappearance =

Early aircraft disappearance

1948 DC-3 disappearance
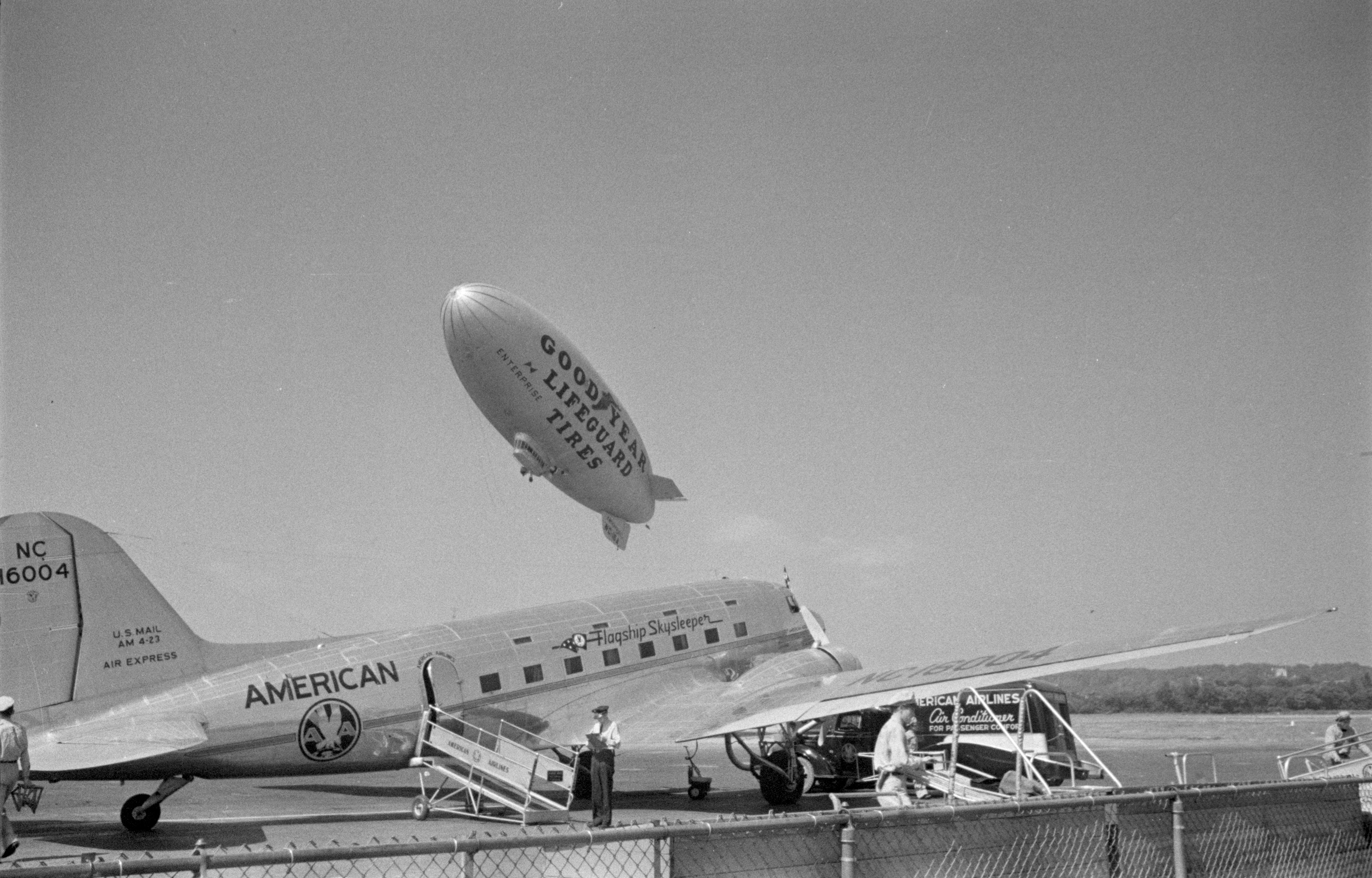
- A Douglas DST from the same production batch and initial operator (American Airlines) as the accident aircraft

Occurrence
- Date: 28 December 1948
- Summary: Disappearance
- Site: Off the eastern coast of Florida

Aircraft
- Aircraft type: Douglas DST-144
- Operator: Airborne Transport
- Registration: NC16002
- Flight origin: San Juan International Airport, Puerto Rico
- Destination: Miami International Airport, Florida
- Occupants: 32
- Passengers: 29
- Crew: 3
- Missing: 32

The disappearance of a Douglas DC-3 airliner, registered NC16002, occurred on the night of 28 December 1948 near the end of a scheduled flight from San Juan, Puerto Rico, to Miami, Florida. The aircraft carried 29 passengers and three crew members. No probable cause for the loss was determined by the official investigation and it remains unsolved.

== Final flight ==
Captained by pilot Robert Linquist, assisted by co-pilot Ernest Hill and stewardess Mary Burke, the aircraft ended its Miami-San Juan leg at 19:40 EST on 27 December. Linquist informed local repair crewmen that a landing gear warning light was not functioning and that the aircraft batteries were discharged and low on water. Unwilling to delay the aircraft's scheduled takeoff for Miami for several hours, Linquist said the batteries would be recharged by the aircraft's generators en route.

Linquist taxied NC16002 to the end of runway 27 for takeoff, but stopped at the end of the apron due to lack of two-way radio communication. Although capable of receiving, Linquist reported to the head of Puerto Rican Transport, who had driven out to the aircraft, that the radio could not transmit because of the low batteries. After agreeing to stay close to San Juan until they were recharged enough to allow two-way contact, NC16002 finally lifted off at 22:03. After circling the city for 11 minutes, Linquist received confirmation from Civil Aeronautics Administration (CAA) at San Juan and told the tower that they were proceeding to Miami on a previous flight plan.

The weather was fine with high visibility, but the aircraft did not respond to subsequent calls from San Juan. At 23:23, the Overseas Foreign Air Route Traffic Control Center at Miami heard a routine transmission from NC16002, wherein Linquist reported they were at 8,300 ft (2,500 m) and had an ETA of 04:03. His message placed the flight about 700 miles (1,100 km) from Miami. Transmissions were heard sporadically throughout the night by Miami, but all were routine.

At 04:13, Linquist reported he was 50 miles (80 km) south of Miami. The transmission was not heard at Miami but was monitored at New Orleans, Louisiana, some 600 miles (970 km) away, and was relayed to Miami. The accident investigation report issued by the Civil Aeronautics Board (CAB) said the pilot may have incorrectly reported his position. At this time the plane only had enough fuel for 1 hour and 20 minutes of flying time left.

Miami weather was clear, but the wind had moved from northwest to northeast. The accident investigation report said that Miami transmitted the wind change information, but neither Miami nor New Orleans "was able to contact the flight". It is therefore unknown whether NC16002 received the information. Without this knowledge the aircraft could have drifted 40–50 miles (64–80 km) off course, which widened the search area to include hills in Cuba, the Everglades and even Gulf of Mexico waters.

On 4 January 1949, two bodies were found 80–90 kilometres (50–56 mi) south of Guantánamo Bay, Cuba. It is unknown if this was connected to the missing plane. (Since the last message from the missing DC-3 was heard not in Miami but New Orleans, if the bodies did come from the missing plane it could indicate the missing plane actually went down somewhere in the Straits of Florida between Florida and Cuba.)

Nothing further was heard from Linquist and the aircraft has never been found. In subsequent years, researchers into unexplained disappearances have included the flight among others said to have disappeared in what came to be termed the Bermuda Triangle.

A plane similar to the DC-3 has been found by divers in the Bermuda Triangle. It is possible that this is the lost aircraft, but this has not been verified.

== Investigation ==
In a report released 15 July 1949, the board convening the investigation filed several factors about the aircraft:

- The aircraft was originally built on 12 June 1936, and had a total of 28,257 flying hours prior to the landing in San Juan. It had been inspected several times in the previous two years and certified to be airworthy.
- The aircraft was given a partial overhaul, including the replacement of both engines, in November 1948. An in-flight test was conducted to judge the results of the overhaul, including flying to New Jersey and back. Again, the aircraft was certified to be airworthy.
- The report noted that although the carrier, aircraft, and crew were certified, at the time of takeoff, the aircraft did not meet the requirements of the operating certificate.
- The company's maintenance records were incomplete. In one case, a subcontractor working on an engine in October 1948 completed the task but did not save any records proving it.

As far as human error, the report cited several occurrences:

- Captain Linquist told San Juan that his landing gear down indicator lamps did not work. This led to the discovery that his batteries were low on water and electrical charge. While he ordered the refilling of the batteries with water, he ordered the reinstallation of the batteries on board the aircraft without recharging them.
- The aircraft left with the batteries charged only enough to satisfy two-way radio communication with the tower, with the understanding that an in-flight flight plan would be filed before they left the vicinity of San Juan. This was not done, and the plane continued on a course for Miami. It was noted in the report that the plane's radio transmitter did not function properly due to the low battery charge.
- The aircraft left San Juan with a cargo/passenger weight 118 lb (54 kg) over the allowable limit.
- A message was sent to the plane concerning a change in wind direction that could have been strong enough to push the plane off course. It was not known if the plane received the message.
- The plane's electrical system was not functioning normally prior to departing San Juan.
- The aircraft had fuel for 7 1/2 hours of flight; at the time the last transmission was intercepted, the flight had gone on for 6 hours and 10 minutes after takeoff, and thus "an error in location would be critical."

Because of a lack of wreckage and other information, probable cause for the loss of the aircraft could not be determined.

== See also ==
- List of Bermuda Triangle incidents
- List of missing aircraft
- List of people who disappeared

== Newspaper references ==
- "30-Passenger Airliner Disappears in Flight From San Juan To Miami," The New York Times, 29 December 1948.
- "Check Cuba Report of Missing Airliner," The New York Times, 30 December 1948.
- "Airliner Hunt Extended," The New York Times, 31 December 1948.
