= List of aircraft (G–Gn) =

This is a list of aircraft in alphabetical order beginning with 'G', up to those beginning with 'Gn'.

== G–Gn ==
=== G-Aerosports ===
- G-Aerosports Archon SF/1
- G-Aerosports Archon SF-2T
- G-Aerosports G-802 Atairon

=== G/B Aircraft ===
(Glenn Beets) does not fly well

- Beets G/B Special

=== G1 Aviation ===
(Le Thor, France)

- G1 Aviation G1

=== Gabardini ===
(Aeroplani Gabardini / Società Anonima Gabardini per l'Incremento dell'Aviazione) also see:SIA

- Gabardini Hydravion 1910 (Monaco-monoplano)
- Gabardini Monoplano Gabarda 1913
- Gabardini Monoplano Checca ('Francesca') Ground trainer
- Gabardini Monoplano ground trainer
- Gabardini Monoplano Scuola (School)
- Gabardini Monoplano Vuolo (Flight)
- Gabardini Idrovolante 1913 'Gabarda' on twin, wooden float gear
- Gabardini HD - Hanriot HD.1 used at the Scuola Aviazione di Cameri
- Gabardini A.300/6 - 3-seat recce biplane, mod. Ansaldo A.300/4*
- Gabardini G.3 1914 'Biplano' 1-/2-seat biplane trainer
- Gabardini G.4
- Gabardini G-4 bis: Single-seat vers. 1 x 120 hp Le Rhone
- Gabardini G-4 bis dc: 'Doppio Comando' dual-control 2-seater
- Gabardini G.5
- Gabardini G.50 Single-seat biplane, a.k.a. (G.50 mc (monocomando))
- Gabardini G.51: Single-seat biplane, 1 x 80 hp Le Rhône 9C rotary
- Gabardini G.51 bis Single-seat biplane, 1 x 110 hp Le Rhône 9J
- Gabardini G.51 dc Doppio Comando
- Gabardini G.6 2-seat biplane advanced trainer, 1 x 120 hp Le Rhone
- Gabardini G.7 2-seat biplane trainer,
- Gabardini G.8 trainer: unarmed, 1 x 140 hp Hispano-Suiza 8A V8 - Unarmed version with lower-rated engine
- Gabardini G.8 fighter: 2 x 7.7mm Vickers mgs, 1 x 200 hp HS 8A V-8
- Gabardini G.8bis
- Gabardini G.9
- Gabardini G.9bis
- Gabardini G.9bis
- Gabardini Lictor 90 1 x 90 hp Fiat A.50S 7-cyl radial, x 1 (MM.345)
- Gabardini Lictor 130 130 hp Alfa Romeo 110 4-cyl inline, x 1 (MM.304)

=== Gabriel ===
(Antoni Gabriel)

- Gabriel Śląsk

=== Gabriel ===
(Pavel & Jan Gabriel)

- Gabriel L7A
- Gabriel P 5
- Gabriel P 6
- Gabriel P 7

=== Gadfly ===
- Gadfly HDW.1

=== GAF ===
(Government Aircraft Factories)

- GAF Jindivik
- GAF Nomad
- GAF Pika

=== Gage ===
(1911: Jay Gage Flying School, Griffith Park, Los Angeles, CA, c.1912: Gage-McClay Co.)

- Gage 1912 Biplane

=== Gail ===
(Gail Aircraft Engineering Co, Sacramento, CA)

- Gail 202 Mantis
- Gail 202A Gold'uster

=== Gaines ===
(Albert B Gaines, New York, NY)

- Gaines 1927 Monoplane

=== Gakkel ===
(Yakov Modestovich Gakkel)

- Gakkel I (a.k.a. YaMG)
- Gakkel II
- Gakkel III
- Gakkel IV
- Gakkel V
- Gakkel VI
- Gakkel VII Rosja
- Gakkel VIII
- Gakkel IX

=== Galaxie ===
- Galaxie G-100
- Galaxie G-100A

=== Galaxy Aerospace ===
(see List of aircraft (I)#IAI)

=== GALCA ===
(Groupement d'Aviation Légère de Casablanca / Messieurs Barzado, Belicha, Sairand, Domecq, Rousseau and Saunier)

- GALCA biplan à fente (biplan à fente - biplane with slot)

=== Gallatin ===
(Harold & Oscar Gallatin, Milwaukee & Waukesha, WI)

- Gallatin 1935 Monoplane
- Gallatin A

=== Gallaudet ===
(Gallaudet Aircraft Corporation)

- Gallaudet Hydroplane
- Gallaudet Wing-Warping Kite
- Gallaudet Hydro-Bike
- Gallaudet 1911 Monoplane
- Gallaudet A-1 Bullet
- Gallaudet A-2 Bullet
- Gallaudet B
- Gallaudet Big Boy
- Gallaudet C-1
- Gallaudet C-2 a.k.a. Military Tractor
- Gallaudet C-3 Tourist
- Gallaudet Chummy
- Gallaudet D-1
- Gallaudet D-2
- Gallaudet D-4
- Gallaudet DB-1
- Gallaudet DB-1B
- Gallaudet Flying Boat
- Gallaudet PW-4
- Gallaudet Twin Hydro
- Gallaudet CO-1
- Gallaudet CO-2
- Gallaudet CO-3
- Gallaudet P-234 (Wright Field)
- Gallaudet P-255 (Wright Field)

=== Galvin ===
(Lincoln School of Flying, 2415 O St, Lincoln, NE)

- Galvin Sky-Lark

=== Galvin ===
- Galvin HC (Hydravion de Chasse)

=== Game Composites ===
- Game Composites GB1 GameBird

=== Gammeter ===
(Harry C Gammeter, Cleveland, OH)

- Gammeter 1907 Ornithopter

=== Gannet ===
(Gannet Aircraft Inc, Sun Valley, CA)

- Gannet Super Widgeon

=== Ganzavia ===
(Ganzavia GT)

- Ganzavia GAK-22 Dino

=== Garbrick ===
(J Lester Garbrick, Centre Hall, PA)

- Garbrick 1941 Biplane
- Garbrick Lark

=== Gardan ===
(Yves Gardan)

- Gardan GY-20 Minicab
- Gardan GY-201
- Gardan GY-30 Supercab
- Gardan GY-80 Horizon
- Gardan GY-90 Mowgli
- Gardan GY-100 Bagheera
- Gardan GY-110 Sher Khan
- Gardan GY-120
- Gardan-Laverlochère GL.10

=== Garland Aerospace ===
(Camden, New South Wales, Australia)

- Garland Vampire

=== Garland-Bianchi ===
- Garland-Bianchi Linnet

=== Garland-Lincoln ===
(Garland Lincoln & Claude Flagg, Van Nuys, CA, E Los Angeles, CA, Glendale, CA)

- Garland-Lincoln N28
- Garland-Lincoln LF-1

=== Garner ===
(Bill Garner, St. Anthony, ID)

- Garner D-260 Senior Aero Sport

=== Garrett ===
(Don Garrett)

- Garrett Pokie Okie

=== Garrison ===
(Peter Garrison, Los Angeles, CA)

- Garrison OM-1 Melmoth
- Garrison OM-2 Melmoth 2

=== Garrow Aircraft ===
(Garrow Aircraft LLC)

- Verticopter

=== Gary ===
(1909: William Pierce Gary, 75 Lincoln Ave, Totowa, NJ, 1910: Non-Capsizable Aeroplane Co, Paterson, NJ)

- Gary Hoople

=== Gaslov ===
(Vladimir Gaslov)

- Gaslov I-2 Impuls

=== Gasne ===
(René Gasne)

- Gasne RG-3

=== Gastambide-Levavasseur ===
(Robert Gastambide et Léon Levavasseur)

- Gastambide-Levavasseur No.1
- Gastambide-Levavasseur No.2 variable area wings

=== Gastambide-Mengin ===
(Jules Gastambide et Gabriel Mengin)

- Gastambide-Mengin monoplane

=== Gasuden ===
(Tokyo Gasu Denki Kogyo KK - Tokyo Gas & Electrical Industry Co. Ltd.)

- Gasuden KR-1 Small Passenger Transport
- Gasuden KR-2 Small Passenger Transport
- Gasuden Model 1 Trainer
- Gasuden Model 2 Trainer
- Gasuden Model 3 Trainer
- Gasuden Koken Long-range research aircraft
- Gasuden TR-1 Medium Passenger Transport
- Gasuden TR-2 Medium Passenger Transport

=== Gatard ===
- Gatard Statoplan AG-01 Alouette
- Gatard Statoplan AG-02 Poussin
- Gatard Statoplan AG-03 Hirondelle
- Gatard Statoplan AG-04 Pigeon
- Gatard Statoplan AG-05 Mésange

=== Gates ===
(B L Gates, Chicago, IL)

- Gates 1910 Aeroplane

=== Gates ===
((Ivan R) Gates Aircraft Corp, 1440 Broadway, New York, NY)

- Gates RSV Convertiplane

=== Gatling ===
(James Henry Gatling, Maney's Neck, NC)

- Gatling 1872 Aeroplane

=== Gaucher ===
(Remy Gaucher)

- Gaucher TRG-662
- Gaucher RG.40 Week-End
- Gaucher RG.40T
- Gaucher RG-45 Club-45
- Gaucher GA-620 Gaucho

=== Gaunt (aircraft constructor) ===
- Gaunt biplane no.2

=== Gauthier ===
(David Gauthier, Seattle, WA)

- Gauthier Sport Model 1

=== Gavilán ===
(Gavilán SA, Columbia)

- Gavilán G358

=== Gaviota ===
(Donald W Whittier, Los Angeles, CA)

- Gaviota ST-1A

=== Gazda ===
(Antoine Gazda, Wakefield, RI, Helicopter Engr & Construction Co.)

- Gazda Helicospeeder
- Gazda 100
- Gazda 101

=== Gazuit-Valladeau ===
(Georges Gazuit & Roger Valladeau)

- Gazuit-Valladeau GV-1020 Gazelle
- Gazuit-Valladeau GV-1031 Gazelle
- Gazuit-Valladeau GV-1032
- Gazuit-Valladeau GV-103

=== Gdecouv'R ===
(Fontaine Lès Dijon, France)

- Gdecouv'R 582

=== GCA ===
(Grupo Construzione Aeronautiche)

- GCA.1 Pedro
- GCA.2 Dumbo
- GCA.3 Etabeta
- Gripo G.G.7

=== GECI International ===
- GECI SK-105 Skylander

=== Gee Bee ===
see List_of_aircraft (Go–Gz) – Granville Brothers

=== Geest ===
(Geeste Flugzeugbau - Waldemaar Geest)

- Geest-Wolfmüller Motorflugzeug (1910)
- Geest Möwe I
- Geest Möwe II
- Geest Möwe III
- Geest Möwe IV
- Geest Möwe V
- Geest Möwe VI
- Geest 1916 single-seat fighter

=== Geffroy ===
- Geffroy 1948 aeroplane

=== Geide ===
(Richard F Geide, Wichita, KS)

- Geide Headwind
- Geide Model A Sport

=== Geiger ===
(Robert V Geiger, Wewaka, IN)

- Geiger 1932 Monoplane

=== Geltz ===
(Roy K Geltz, Lancaster, PA)

- Geltz Bluebird
- Geltz Deluxe

=== Gem ===
(Gem Aircraft)

- Gem Sky Gem

=== Gemini ===
(Gemini International)

- Gemini Hummingbird

=== Gemini Powered Parachutes ===
(Culver, IN)

- Gemini Classic
- Gemini Star
- Gemini Twin
- Gemini Ultra Star
- Gemini Viper

=== GEN ===
(Gennai Yanagisawa / GEN Corporation)

- BDH-1 Boy's Dream Helicopter
- BDH-2
- BDH-3
- BDH-4
- GEN H-4

=== Genair ===
- Genair Aeriel II

=== Genairco ===
- Genairco Biplane

=== General ===
(General Aircraft Corporation, Lowell, MA)

- General Skyfarer

=== General ===
(General Aeronautic Co, 110-112 W 40 St, New York, NY)

- General 1916 Biplane

=== General ===
(General Aeroplane Co, 1507 Jefferson Ave, E Detroit, MI)

- General 1916 Flying Boat
- General 1916 Gamma S Seaplane
- General 1916 Gamma L Landplane

=== General ===
(General Aircraft Corp (Conrad & John W Dietz), Cincinnati, OH)

- GAC Nighthawk

=== General ===
(Hazleton General Aircraft Corp (Pres: George B Markle), Hazleton, PA; (built at Berwyck, PA))

- General Navigator
- General Pilot

=== General ===
(General Airplanes Corp, 553 Abbott Rd, Buffalo, NY (founders: Charles S Rieman, A Francis Arcier))

- General 101 Surveyor (a.k.a. Observer)
- General 102 Aristocrat
- General 107 Mailman
- General 111-C Cadet

=== General ===
(General Airplane Services (Jack Yentzer), Sheridan, WY)

- General Model 11

=== General ===
- General Aircraft Corporation GAC-100

=== General Aircraft Ltd ===
- General Aircraft Monospar ST-4
- General Aircraft Monospar ST-6
- General Aircraft Monospar ST-10
- General Aircraft Monospar ST-11
- General Aircraft Monospar ST-12
- General Aircraft Monospar ST-18 Croydon
- General Aircraft Monospar ST-25
- General Aircraft GAL.26
- General Aircraft GAL.33 Cagnet
- General Aircraft GAL.38 Fleet Shadower
- General Aircraft GAL.41
- General Aircraft GAL.42 Cygnet II
- General Aircraft GAL.45 Owlet
- General Aircraft GAL.47
- General Aircraft GAL.48 Hotspur
- General Aircraft G.A.L.48B Twin-Hotspur
- General Aircraft GAL.49 Hamilcar
- General Aircraft GAL.50 1/2 scale Hamilcar
- General Aircraft GAL.55
- General Aircraft GAL.56
- General Aircraft GAL.58 Hamilcar X powered Hamilcar (2x Bristol Mercury)
- General Aircraft GAL.60 Universal Freighter
- General Aircraft GAL.61

=== General Atomics ===
- General Atomics GNAT 750
- General Atomics RQ-1 Predator

=== General Avia ===
- General Avia Picchio
- General Avia Delfino
- General Avia Pegaso
- General Avia Jet Condor
- General Avia Pinguino
- General Avia Airtruck
- General Avia Canguro
- General Avia Sparviero

=== General Aviation ===
(General Aviation Manufacturing Corporation, Baltimore, MD)

- General Aviation AF-15
- General Aviation PJ
- General Aviation GA-43
- General Aviation XFA

=== General Aviation Design Bureau of Ukraine ===
(Kyiv, Ukraine)

- General Aviation Design Bureau T-2 Maverick
- General Aviation Design Bureau T-32 Maverick

=== General Dynamics ===
- McDonnell Douglas/General Dynamics A-12 Avenger
- General Dynamics F-16 Fighting Falcon
  - F-16 VISTA
- General Dynamics F-111 Aardvark
- General Dynamics Model 100
- General Dynamics A-8

=== General Motors ===
(Eastern Div, General Motors Corp.)

- General Motors FM Wildcat
- General Motors FM-2 Wildcat
- General Motors F3M Bearcat
- General Motors TBM Avenger
- Fisher P-75A Eagle

=== General-Western ===
(General-Western Aero Corp Ltd (founders: Albin Peterson & L F Vremsak), Burbank, CA)

- General-Western Bantam
- General-Western Phantom
- General-Western B-6
- General-Western P-1 Meteor
- General-Western P-2 Meteor
- General-Western T-6 Air Coach

=== Georgias Special ===
(Vern Georgia & Herb Hecker, Bloomington, MN)

- Georgias Special

=== Gephart ===
(Harry L Gephart, Silver City, NM)

- Gephart 1930 Monoplane

=== Geraci ===
(Al Geraci, Roselle, IL)

- Geraci Advance Jeep-O-Plane

=== Gérard ===
(André Gérard)

- Gérard RG-45 Club-45
- SIPA-Gérard NC.853G

=== Gerbrecht ===
- Gerbrecht W.3

=== Gere ===
(George W "Bud" Gere Jr, Minneapolis, MN)

- Gere Crusader
- Gere Sport

=== Gerfan ===
- Gerfan RV 02

=== Gérin ===
(Jaques Gérin, France)

- Gérin 1936 Varivol biplane
- Gérin 1938 V.6E Varivol Racer

=== Gerhardt ===
(W F Gerhardt & E L Pratt, Dayton, OH)

- Gerhardt Autogiro
- Gerhardt Cycloplane

=== German Aircraft ===
(German Aircraft GmbH)

- German Aircraft Sky-Maxx

=== German Gyro ===
(German Gyro Safety Aviation GmbH)

- German Gyro Matto

=== Germania ===
(Germania Flugzeugwerke G.m.b.H.)

- Germania DB
- Germania JM
- Germania K.D.D.
- Germania B type 1915
- Germaina B.I
- Germaina C.I
- Germaina C.II
- Germaina C.IV

=== Gerner ===
(Adlerwerke den Flugzeugbau Gerner)

- Gerner G.I
- Gerner G.IIR

=== Germe ===
- Germe 1909 Biplane

=== Geselle ===
(Matilda Geselle, Wichita, KS)

- Geselle 1927 Monoplane

=== Geuther ===
(Gene Geuther, Lansdale, PA)

- Geuther Angel Kitten

=== Ghods Industry ===
- Ghods Saeghe
- Ghods Talash
- Ghods Mohajer

=== GibboGear ===
(Mark Gibson, Winter Haven, FL)

- GibboGear Butterfly

=== Gidroplan ===
(Gidroplan LLC)

- Gidroplan Tsikada
- Gidroplan Tsikada-M
- Gidroplan Sky Wind-1
- Gidroplan Tsikada-M3
- Gidroplan Tsikada-4
- Gidroplan Sky Wind-AT

=== Gidrosamolet ===
(Gidrosamolet LCC / Chernov) see Chernov

=== GIL ===
(GIL - Główny Instytut Lotnictwa - Main Aviation Institute)

- GIL BŻ-4 Żuk

=== Gilbert ===
(Charles Gilbert, Dorset, OH)

- Gilbert Toots (a.k.a. Model 30)

=== Giles ===
See:AkroTech Aviation

=== Gilkey ===
(Lynn W Gilkey, New Castle, PA)

- Gilkey Sport

=== Gillespie ===
(G Curtis Gillespie, Brooklyn, NY)

- Gillespie Aeroplane

=== Gillette ===
(P E Gillette, Salt Lake City, UT)

- Gillette 1910 Aerodyne

=== Gillis ===
((Carl) Gillis Aircraft Co, Battle Creek, MI)

- Gillis Crusader

=== Gilmore ===
(Lyman Gilmore Jr, Grass Valley, CA 1909: Colfax Aeroplane Co. 1910: Gilmore Airship Co.)

- Gilmore 1898 steam-powered Aeroplane
- Gilmore 1908 Pusher-Tractor
- Gilmore 1911 Monoplane

=== Gilpin ===
(Charles W Gilpin, Los Angeles, CA)

- Gilpin 1925 Biplane

=== Gin Gliders ===
(Yongin, South Korea)

- Gin Atlas
- Gin Bandit
- Gin Bobcat
- Gin Bolero
- Gin Bolero Plus
- Gin Bongo
- Gin Boomerang
- Gin Carrera
- Gin Falcon
- Gin Fluid
- Gin Fuse
- Gin Gangster
- Gin GTO
- Gin Nano
- Gin Nomad
- Gin Oasis
- Gin Pegasus
- Gin Rage
- Gin Safari
- Gin Sprint
- Gin Vantage
- Gin Yak
- Gin Yeti

=== Ginnochio ===
(Manlio Ginnochio)

- Ginnochio 1912 flying boat (Argus 100hp)

=== Gippsland ===
- Gippsland GA8 Airvan
- Gippsland GA10
- Gippsland GA200 Fatman

=== Giraud ===
(Wilfrid Giraud)

- Giraud Elytroplan

=== Giraud-Sablier ===
(Wilfrid Giraud & Sablier)

- Giraud-Sablier T.4

=== Giraudet ===
(Giraudet)

- Giraudet DG.01 Loriot

=== Giravia ===
- Giravia LP.10

=== Gittens ===
(David L Gittens, Santa Fe, NM)

- Gittens Ikenga

=== Givaudan ===
- Givaudan 1909 Annular biplane

=== Glanard ===
(Raymond Glanard)

- Glanard Monoplan

=== Glasair ===
(Glasair Acquisitions LLC (Pres: Thomas Wathen), Riverside, CA)

- Glasair I
- Glasair II
- Glasair III
- Glasair Glastar
- Glasair Turbine 250
- Glasair SH
- Arocet AT-9 Stalker
- Glasair Merlin LSA
- Glasair Sportsman

=== Glaser-Dirks ===
See also DG Flugzeugbau GmbH

- Gläser-Dirks DG-100
- Gläser-Dirks DG-101
- Gläser-Dirks DG-200
- Gläser-Dirks DG-200/17
- Gläser-Dirks DG-202
- Gläser-Dirks DG-300
- Gläser-Dirks DG-303
- Gläser-Dirks DG-400
- Gläser-Dirks DG-500
- Gläser-Dirks DG-500/18
- Gläser-Dirks DG-500/22
- Gläser-Dirks DG-505
- Gläser-Dirks DG-600
- Gläser-Dirks DG-600/18

=== Glasflügel ===
- Björn Stender BS-1
- Glasflügel H-30 GFK
- Glasflügel H-201 Standard-Libelle
- Glasflügel 202 Standard-Libelle
- Glasflügel 203 Standard-Libelle
- Glasflügel 204 Standard-Libelle
- Glasflügel 205 Club-Libelle
- Glasflügel 206 Hornet
- Glasflügel 206 Hornet C
- Glasflügel H-301 Libelle
- Glasflügel 303 Mosquito
- Glasflügel 304
- Glasflügel 401 Kestrel (129)
- Glasflügel 402
- Glasflügel 604 Kestrel 22
- Glasflügel 701
- Glasflügel 704

=== Glassic Composites ===
(Glassic Composites, LLC, Sale Creek, TN)

- Glassic SQ2000

=== Glatfelter ===
(Edward W Glatfelter, Newton Square, PA)

- Glatfelter G-100 Glaticopter
- Glatfelter XRG-65

=== Gleek ===
(Albert Gleek Jr, 73 Garfield Ave, Paterson, NJ)

- Gleek 1933 Biplane

=== Glen-Lee ===
(G M Glendenning & A L Kennedy, Ontario, Canada)

- Glen-Lee Special

=== Glenmont ===
(H P "Glen" Warren & John G Montijo, San Luis Obispo, CA)

- Glenmont 1927 Monoplane

=== Glenn ===
(Timothy A Glenn, Detroit, MI)

- Glenn 1929 Monoplane
- Glenn 1931 Monoplane
- Glenn 1935 Monoplane

=== Glenview ===
(Glenview Metal Products Co, Delanco, NJ)

- Glenview GMP-1 Fly-Ride

=== Glidaire ===
(Glidaire Co, 119 E Martin St, San Antonio, TX)

- Glidaire 1931 powered sailplane

=== Glideoplane ===
(Glideoplane & Engine Co Inc, 1220 N Western Ave, Oklahoma City, OK)

- Glideoplane 1931 powered sailplane

=== Global ===
(Global Aircraft Corporation)

- Global GT-3

=== Globe ===
- Globe GC-1 Swift
- Globe BTC-1
- Globe KDG Snipe
- Globe KD2G Firefly
- Globe KD3G Snipe
- Globe KD4G Quail
- Globe KD5G

=== Gloster ===
(Gloster Aircraft Company)

- Gloster II
- Gloster III
- Gloster IV
- Gloster VI
- Gloster AS.31 Survey
- Gloster E.1/44, also known as Gloster Ace
- Gloster E.28/39
- Gloster F.5/34
- Gloster F.9/37
- Gloster Gambet
- Gloster Gannet
- Gloster Gamecock
- Gloster Gauntlet
- Gloster Gladiator
- Gloster Gnatsnapper
- Gloster Goldfinch
- Gloster Goral
- Gloster Gorcock
- Gloster Goring
- Gloster Grebe
- Gloster Grouse
- Gloster Guan
- Gloster Javelin
- Gloster Mars
- Gloster Meteor
- Gloster Meteor F8 "Prone Pilot"
- Gloster Nightjar
- Gloster Sea Gladiator
- Gloster Sparrowhawk
- Gloster TC.33
- Gloster TSR.38

=== Glowin'ski ===
- Głowiński monoplane

=== Gluhareff ===
(E (Eugene) Gluhareff Helicopter Corp, Palm Springs, FL)

- Gluhareff MEG-1X
- Gluhareff MEG-2X
- Gluhareff MEG-3X

=== Gmoser ===
(A T Gmoser Jr, Milwaukee, WI)

- Gmoser Trainer

______
