= Działowski D.K.D.1 =

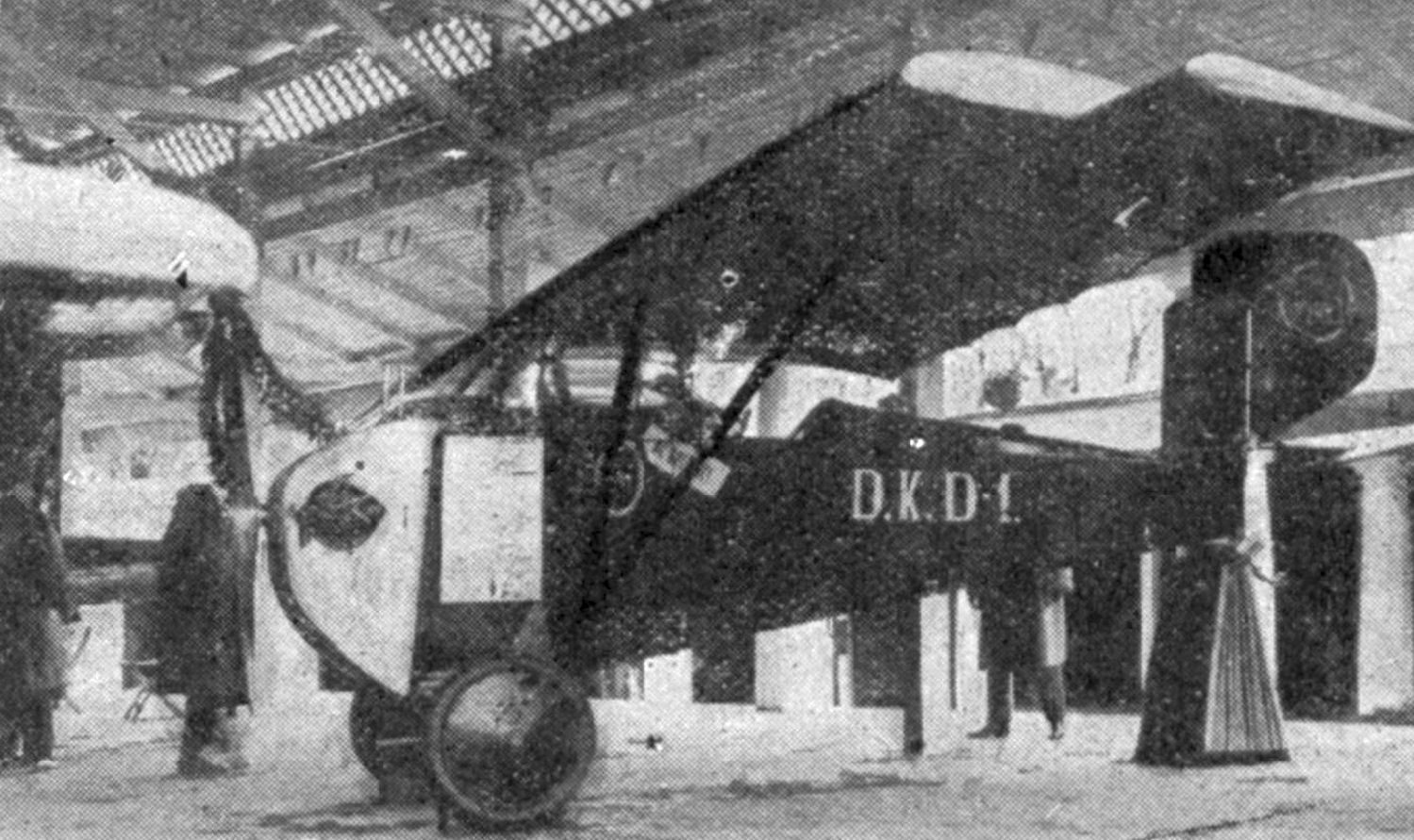

General information
- Type: Two seat cabin monoplane
- National origin: Poland
- Designer: Stanisław Działowski
- Number built: 1

History
- First flight: 1 February 1926

The Działowski D.K.D.1 was the first powered aircraft designed by Stanisław Działowski. It was a low-power high-wing monoplane with a cabin for one passenger. After attending an aviation exhibition in Warsaw in 1927 it was badly damaged when the engine failed as it left and it did not fly again.

== Design and development ==
In the early 1920s Stanisław Działowski was head of aircraft assembly at the military flying school at Bydgoszcz. He and his brother Mieczysław began aircraft design with a glider, the Bydgoszczanka, which flew at the 1925 Second Polish Glider Contest. In the same year they began work on the D.K.D.1. The surname initials D.K.D were those of the two brothers and of Jan Kruger, a local shoemaker who provided some funding and also bought the Gabriel brothers the Haacke engine that had been used in the Gabriel P 5 and P 6. The wing was built in the military workshop but they were later forced out to a cellar in the town.

The D.K.D.1 was a high wing aircraft with an enclosed cabin for one passenger and an open cockpit for the pilot. It had a one-piece wooden wing of trapezoidal plan with an unswept leading edge, built around two spars and fabric covered. The wing was braced with V-struts from the lower fuselage longerons to the spars. The aircraft first flew with the wing centrally fixed directly to the top of the fuselage but flight testing revealed poor forward visibility from the cockpit and the wing was raised a short distance on four vertical, faired struts, allowing the pilot to look forward under the wing. There was a large, deep cut-out in the trailing edge over the cockpit. The generous balances on its ailerons extended beyond the squared wing tips.

The D.K.D.1 was powered by a 22 kW (30 hp) Haacke HFM-2 air-cooled flat twin engine mounted onto the rectangular section steel tube fuselage frame under single-curvature duralumin sheet, with its cylinder heads exposed for cooling. Behind it the deep, flat-sided fuselage was fabric covered apart from its rounded, plywood covered decking. The enclosed, single seat passenger cabin was immediately behind the engine and ahead of the cockpit. It had a small window on each side and was entered by a port-side door.

Both fin and tailplane, the latter located on top of the fuselage, were small and rectangular in shape, mounting large, balanced control surfaces. These were also approximately rectangular but the bottom of the rudder was cut at an angle to allow the one-piece elevator to operate. All the rear surfaces were wooden framed and fabric covered.

Its undercarriage was fixed and of the tailskid type, with mainwheels with rubber cord shock absorbers on a single axle. The axle was mounted on short steel tube V-struts hinged from the lower fuselage longerons, with further steel struts from both the longerons and central fuselage underside to the axle's centre.

== Operational history ==
The D.K.D.1 first flew in February 1926, piloted by Muślewski and the early tests led to the raising of the wing noted above and to other changes to the centre-section. Its designer also flew it and in late April 1927 took it to an aviation exhibition held in Warsaw. His 300 km (190 mi; 160 nmi), bad weather leg from Toruń to Warsaw has been reported as "the first long cross-country flight to be made on a Polish-designed lightplane". Their earlier base at Bydgodaszcz had become unreceptive to civilian flying but another regiment at Kraków was much more sympathetic, so he attempted to take the D.K.D.1 there. Early in the flight the old Haacke engine failed and the D.K.D.1 was badly damaged in the emergency landing. Its remains were taken to Kraków and parts of it were used in the group's next aircraft, the D.K.D.3.

== Specifications ==
Data from Cynk (1971)

General characteristics

- Crew: One
- Capacity: One passenger
- Length: 5.5 m (18 ft 1 in)
- Wingspan: 8.4 m (27 ft 7 in)
- Height: 1.9 m (6 ft 3 in)
- Wing area: 12.1 m^{2} (130 sq ft)
- Aspect ratio: 5.6
- Airfoil: Gôttingen 441
- Empty weight: 220 kg (485 lb)
- Gross weight: 395 kg (871 lb)
- Powerplant: 1 × Haacke HFM-2 air-cooled flat twin engine, 22 kW (30 hp)
- Propellers: 2-bladed

Performance

- Maximum speed: 120 km/h (75 mph, 65 kn) at sea level
- Cruise speed: 100 km/h (62 mph, 54 kn)
- Stall speed: 65 km/h (40 mph, 35 kn)
- Take-off distance: 80 m (260 ft)
- Landing distance: 100 m (330 ft)
