= María de los Ángeles Duarte =

Ecuadorian politician

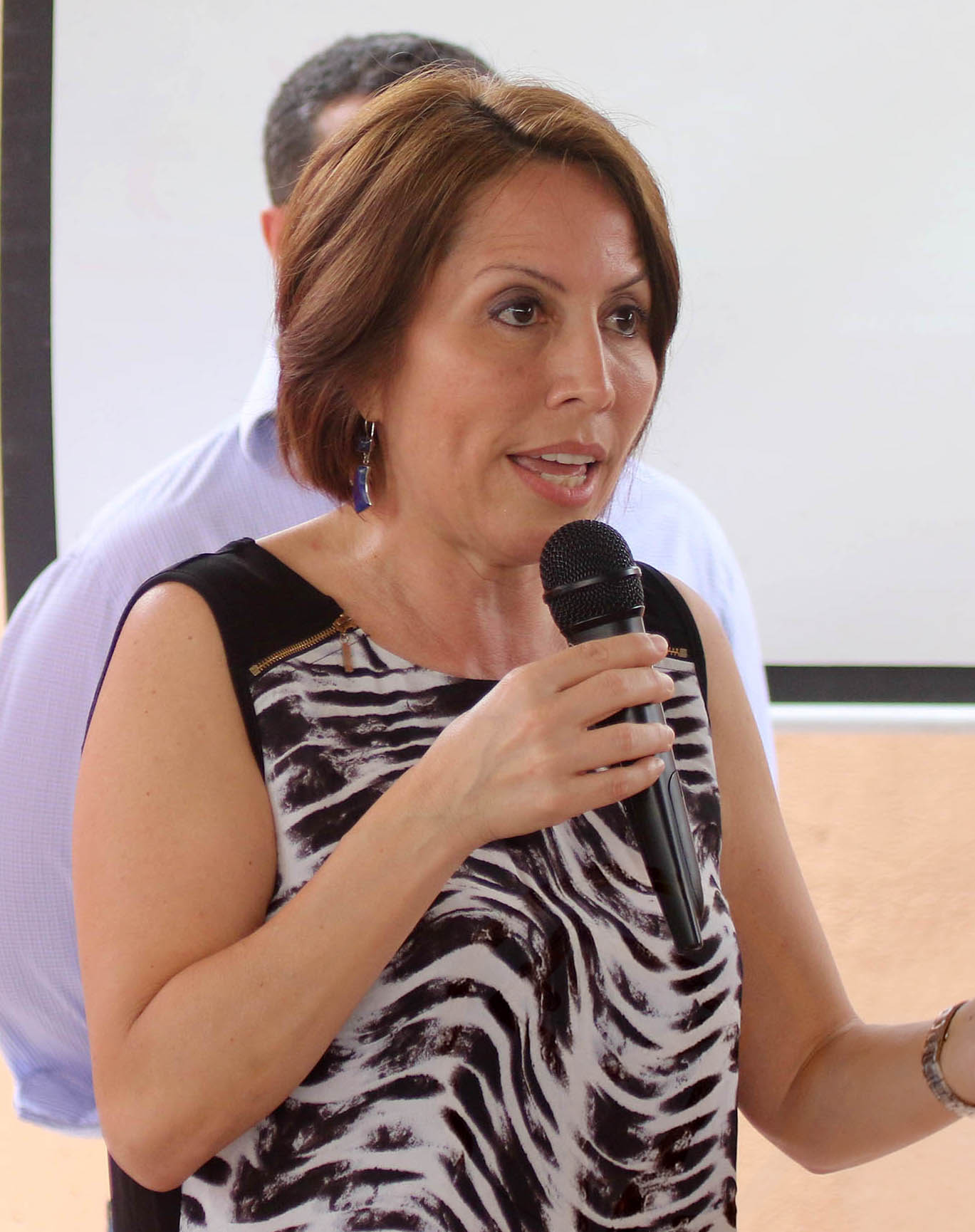
- Born: February 15, 1963 (age 63); Guayaquil
- Occupation: Politician
- Known for: former minister found guilty of bribery

María de los Ángeles Duarte Pesantes (born February 15, 1963) is an Ecuadorian politician and former cabinet minister. She was Minister of Transport and Public Works from 2010 to March 2014, Minister of Economic and Social Inclusion between June 2009 and April 2010, and Minister of Urban Development and Housing from 2007 to 2009. After charges were brought against her for bribery she took refuge in the Argentinian Embassy in Quito in 2020.

== Life ==
Ángeles Duarte was born in Guayaquil in 1963. In 1969, along with her mother and two siblings, she was a passenger on an Ecuatoriana de Aviación flight that was hijacked and diverted to Cuba.

She was Minister of Transport and Public Works from April 5, 2010, to March 10, 2014, Minister of Economic and Social Inclusion between June 2009 and April 2010, and Minister of Urban Development and Housing from 2007 to 2009.

Ángeles Duarte was a former Minister of Public Works when she took refuge in the Argentine Embassy in Quito following a corruption case that implicated the former president Rafael Correa. Some have credited this to "lawfare" where the law is used for political ends. Both Correa and his vice-president, Jorge Glas, were sentenced to prison terms in 2020. In 2021 she was in the embassy facing an eight-year prison sentence. Because she was refusing to wear an electronic anklet she was facing an additional sentence.
