= 1969 in aviation =

This is a list of aviation-related events from 1969.

== Events ==
- The Canadian Snowbirds aerobatic team is formed.
- A fifth annual Harmon Trophy is created to honor the world's outstanding astronaut of the year and is awarded for the first time, honoring the outstanding astronauts of 1968.
- Interflug begins operation of the Tupolev Tu-134, its first jet airliner.

=== January ===
- January 1 – Agrolet is renamed Slov-Air.
- January 2
  - A hijacker commandeers an Olympic Airways Douglas DC-6B during a domestic flight in Greece from Heraklion, Crete, to Athens and forces it to fly to Cairo, Egypt.
  - Three hijackers take control of Eastern Airlines Flight 401, a Douglas DC-8 with 146 people on board flying from John F. Kennedy International Airport in New York City to Miami, Florida, and force it to fly them to Cuba.
- January 5 – The flight crew of Ariana Afghan Airlines Flight 701, a Boeing 727-113C, fails to extend the airliner's flaps while on approach to London Gatwick Airport in heavy fog. The plane crashes short of the runway, striking a house in Horley, Surrey, England, killing 48 of the 62 people on board and two people on the ground. All 14 survivors are injured, as is one person on the ground.
- January 7 – A male passenger hijacks Avianca Flight 654, a Douglas DC-4 (registration HK-1028) making a domestic flight in Colombia from Riohacha to Maicao with 60 people on board, and demands that it fly him to Cuba. After a refueling stop at Barranquilla, Colombia, the airliner continues to Cuba, landing at Santiago de Cuba.
- January 9 – Saying he hates the United States, loves the Soviet Union, and is on the run from the U.S. Federal Bureau of Investigation, 21-year-old Ronald Bohle hijacks Eastern Airlines Flight 831, a Boeing 727 flying from Miami, Florida, to Nassau in the Bahamas with 79 people on board, and demands to be flown to Cuba. He holds a flight attendant hostage with a 7-inch (17.8-cm) switchblade until disembarking in Cuba, where he is imprisoned.
- January 11
  - Believing himself to be a key operative in a large conspiracy by the U.S. Federal Bureau of Investigation and the U.S. Central Intelligence Agency to assassinate Fidel Castro, Robert "Red" Helmey enters the cockpit of United Airlines Flight 459 – a Boeing 727 flying from Savannah, Georgia, to Miami, Florida, with 20 people on board – with a .38-caiber pistol and orders the flight crew to fly him to Havana, Cuba. The Cubans imprison him upon arrival, keeping him in solitary confinement for 109 days before allowing him to return to the United States.
  - A hijacker takes control of an Aérolíneas Peruanas (APSA) Convair CV-990 Coronado flying from Panama City, Panama, to Miami, Florida, and forces it to fly to Cuba.
- January 13
  - With its cockpit crew so occupied with attempting to diagnose the lack of a nose gear green light that they inadvertently allow its rate of descent to increase while on approach to Los Angeles International Airport in Los Angeles, the Scandinavian Airlines McDonnell Douglas DC-8-62 Sverre Viking, operating as Flight 933 with 45 people on board, crashes in Santa Monica Bay 6 miles (9.7 km) short of the runway and breaks into three pieces, two of which sink immediately. Fifteen people die, and 17 of the 30 survivors are injured.
  - Accompanied by his three-year-old son, Kenneth McPeek jams a sawed-off shotgun in the back of a flight attendant aboard Delta Air Lines Flight 297 – a Convair CV-880 flying from Detroit, Michigan, to Miami, Florida, with 77 people on board – and demands that it fly to Cuba. As the flight attendant informs the pilot of the hijacking, she closes the door to the cockpit, locking McPeek out. With McPeek not threatening anyone after that, the captain lands at Miami, where McPeek surrenders quietly.
- January 14
  - The United States Navy announces that the Grumman F-14 Tomcat has won the competition for a new long-range fleet air defense fighter.
  - Off Hawaii, a MK-32 Zuni rocket loaded on a parked F-4 Phantom II aboard the U.S. Navy aircraft carrier USS Enterprise (CVN-65) explodes after being overheated by an aircraft start unit mounted to a tow tractor. The explosion sets off fires and additional explosions across the flight deck, killing 27 and injuring 314 men and knocking the ship out of action until 1 March.
- January 18 – United Airlines Flight 266, a Boeing 727-22C, crashes into Santa Monica Bay off the coast of California four minutes after takeoff from Los Angeles International Airport. All 38 people on board die.
- January 19
  - A hijacker commandeers Eastern Airlines Flight 9, a Douglas DC-8 with 171 people on board flying from John F. Kennedy International Airport in New York City to Miami, Florida, and forces it to fly to Cuba.
  - Ten hijackers take control of an Ecuatoriana Lockheed L-188 Electra during a domestic flight in Ecuador from Guayaquil to Quito, demanding to be flown to Cuba.
- January 22 – The U.S. 9th Marine Regiment begins Operation Dewey Canyon – an operation dependent completely on helicopters – in South Vietnam's Da Krong Valley. It will conclude on March 19, rated as the 9th Marines′ most successful operation of the Vietnam War.
- January 24 – A hijacker commandeers National Airlines Flight 424, a Boeing 727 flying from Key West, Florida, to New York City with 47 people on board, and forces it to fly to Cuba.
- January 28
  - Armed with a .38-caliber revolver and what they claim is dynamite, prison escapees Bryon Vaughn Booth and Clinton Robert Smith hijack National Airlines Flight 64 – a Douglas Super DC-8 flying from New Orleans, Louisiana, to Miami, Florida, with 32 people on board – and force it to fly to Havana, Cuba, where Cuban authorities arrest and imprison them.
  - Armed with a single revolver, Everett White, Noble Mason, and Larry Brooks hijack Eastern Airlines Flight 121 – a Douglas DC-8 flying from Atlanta, Georgia, to Miami, Florida, with 113 people on board – and force it to fly to Cuba. To prevent panic, the captain does not inform the passengers that the airliner is diverting to Cuba.
- January 31 – A hijacker commandeers National Airlines Flight 44, a Douglas DC-8 flying from San Francisco, California, to Tampa, Florida, with 63 people on board, and forces it to fly to Cuba.

=== February ===
- February 3
  - Armed with a paring knife and a can of insect repellent they claim is a bomb, 21-year-old Michael Peparo and his girlfriend, 18-year-old Tamsin Fitzgerald, hijack National Airlines Flight 73, a Boeing 727 flying from New York City to Miami, Florida, with 70 people on board, and demand to be flown to Cuba, where they hope to be together and work in the sugar cane fields. After the captain tells Peparo that the Cubans will imprison them for 25 years, they agree to land in Miami instead, where they release all the passengers. U.S. Federal Bureau of Investigation agents then storm the plane and arrest them.
  - Four hijackers commandeer Eastern Airlines Flight 7, a Boeing 727 flying from Newark, New Jersey, to Miami, Florida, and demand to be flown to Cuba.
- February 4 – The last surviving XB-70 Valkyrie – the U.S. Air Force's XB-70A Air Vehicle 1 (AV-1) – makes its last flight, a subsonic trip from Edwards Air Force Base, California, to Wright-Patterson Air Force Base, Ohio, where it is retired and will be placed on display at what is now the National Museum of the United States Air Force.
- February 5 – A male passenger hijacks SAM Colombia Flight 601, a Douglas C-54G-1-DO Skymaster (registration HK-1065) with 47 people on board, during a domestic flight in Colombia from Barranquilla to Cartagena and forces it to fly him to Santiago de Cuba in Cuba.
- February 8 – Demanding to be flown to Cuba, a hijacker attempts to take control of a Douglas DC-6 airliner during a flight in Mexico from Mexico City to Villahermosa, but is subdued.
- February 10 – Armed with a pistol, Peter Alvarez takes a stewardess hostage aboard Eastern Airlines Flight 950 – a Douglas DC-8 with 119 people on board flying from San Juan, Puerto Rico, to Miami, Florida – and demands that it fly him to Cuba so that he can be with his ailing father. The 230-pound (100 kg) professional wrestler Larry "Abdullah the Butcher" Shreve, a passenger on the plane, moves to subdue the 300-pound (140 kg) Alvarez, but 170-pound (77 kg) steward Vincent Doccolo interposes himself between the two men and manages to talk Shreve out of it. After the plane lands at Havana, Cuba, its passengers are detained for five hours, but then are allowed to depart aboard the same plane – a break from the Cuban policy in the nine previous U.S. airliner hijackings in 1969 and most of the 14 such occurrences in 1968, in which Cuban authorities had required passengers to disembark and await transportation back to the United States aboard a different aircraft.
- February 11 – Three hijackers take control of a Linea Aeropostal Venezolana (LAV) Douglas DC-9 flying from San Juan, Puerto Rico, to Miami, Florida, and force it to fly to Cuba.
- February 18
  - Four members of the Popular Front for the Liberation of Palestine attack El Al Flight 432, a Boeing 720-058B with 28 people on board, with AK-47 assault rifles and hand grenades while it is preparing for takeoff at Zurich Airport in Zürich, Switzerland, mortally wounding the first officer and injuring six other people. An Israeli undercover security guard on the plane opens fire on the attackers from a cockpit window, then gets off the plane and continues to fire on them, killing their leader before Swiss police arrive and arrest him and the three surviving attackers. The incident reveals for the first time that armed security personnel ride aboard Israeli airliners.
  - Hawthorne Nevada Airlines Flight 708, a Douglas DC-3, crashes into a sheer cliff face on Mount Whitney near Lone Pine, California, killing all 35 people on board. The plane's wreckage will not be found until August 8.
- February 24 – Far Eastern Air Transport Flight 104, a Handley Page Dart Herald, suffers the failure of an engine and attempts to make an emergency landing at Tainan Airport in Tainan City on Taiwan. Before reaching the airport, the plane belly-lands in a clearing in a wooded area, skids into a creek, breaks into three pieces, and catches fire, killing all 36 people on board.
- February 25 – Shortly after takeoff from Atlanta, Georgia, a male passenger armed with a .22-caliber pistol hijacks Eastern Airlines Flight 955, a Douglas DC-8 bound for Miami, Florida, and forces it to fly to Havana, Cuba, where he remains after the airliner returns to the United States.

=== March ===
- During March, the Indonesian airline PT Sempati Air Transport begins flight operations, using Douglas DC-3 aircraft. In 1994 it will change its name to Sempati Air.
- March 1
  - The Republic-of-China-government-owned Aerospace Industrial Development Corporation (AIDC), is established in Taiwan.
  - The U.S. Army's 101st Airborne Division (Airmobile) begins Operation Massachusetts Striker, a helicopter-borne assault against North Vietnamese forces in South Vietnam's A Shau Valley. It will continue until May 8.
- March 3 – The United States Navy establishes its Fighter Weapons School at Naval Air Station Miramar, California, to improve its fighter pilots′ dogfighting skills. The school will become popularly known as "TOPGUN."
- March 5 – Black Panther Party member Anthony Bryant hijacks National Airlines Flight 97, a Boeing 727 flying from New York City to Miami, Florida, robs several passengers, and forces the airliner to fly to Havana, Cuba. Unknown to him, one of his robbery victims is a Cuban intelligence operative, from whom he steals US$1,700 in cash in a briefcase, and as a result he is imprisoned for 11 years in Cuba before returning to the United States in 1980, claiming that his superiors in the Black Panther Party had ordered him to hijack the airliner as part of a mission to arrange for the purchase of bazookas.
- March 8 – President of Egypt Gamal Abdel Nasser formally announces the beginning of the War of Attrition with Israel, although the war in reality has been in progress since July 1, 1967. It largely will consist of combat between Israeli Air Force aircraft and Egyptian surface-to-air missiles.
- March 11
  - Two explosions occur in the tourist-class passenger compartment of an Ethiopian Airlines Boeing 707-379C (registration ET-ACQ) while it is on the ground at Frankfurt International Airport in Frankfurt-am-Main, West Germany, injuring several cleaning women. The Eritrean Liberation Front claims responsibility, saying the explosions are retribution for the transportation of Ethiopian troops into Eritrea aboard Ethiopian Airlines aircraft.
  - A male passenger hijacks SAM Colombia Flight 600, a Douglas C-54A-15-DC Skymaster (registration HK-757) with 38 people on board, during a domestic flight in Colombia from Medellín to Barranquilla and demands that it to fly him to Cuba. While the plane is on the ground at Cartagena, Colombia, to refuel, a passenger attempts to overpower the hijacker and in the ensuing struggle a mechanic is killed and the hijacker suffers injuries and is subdued.
  - The original Golden West Airlines ceases operations. Aero Commuter acquires several of its assets, including its name, and becomes the new Golden West Airlines.
- March 16
  - Viasa Flight 742, a McDonnell Douglas DC-9-30, is unable to gain altitude after takeoff from Maracaibo, Venezuela, strikes power lines, and crashes into the La Trinidad section of the city, killing all 84 people on board and 71 people on the ground. San Francisco Giants pitcher Néstor Chávez is among the dead. The combined death toll of 155 makes it the deadliest aviation accident in history at the time.
  - Shortly after takeoff from San Andrés, Colombia, for a domestic flight to Barranquilla, a passenger hijacks Aerocondor Colombia Flight 131, a Douglas DC-6 (registration HK-754) with 45 people on board, and forces it to fly to Camagüey, Cuba.
- March 17
  - Four hijackers commandeer a Faucett Perú Boeing 727 during a domestic flight in Peru from Lima to Arequipa and force it to fly to Havana, Cuba.
  - Armed with a shoebox full of dynamite and saying he is a communist who wants to go to Cuba to be with his political brethren, Robert Lee Sandlin enters the cockpit of Delta Air Lines Flight 518 – a Douglas DC-9 with 64 people on board flying from Atlanta Georgia, to Charleston, South Carolina, with a stop at Augusta, Georgia – during the Atlanta-to-Augusta segment of the flight and orders the pilot to fly him to Havana, Cuba. He also asks the pilot not to tell the passengers that a hijacking is in progress, so the pilot tells the passengers that the airliner is returning to Atlanta due to bad weather at Charleston. Upon arrival at Havana, the DC-9 parks next to the Faucett Perú Boeing 727 hijacked earlier in the day. Sandlin disembarks and is imprisoned by Cuban authorities.
- March 18 – In Operation Breakfast, 48 U.S. Air Force B-52 Stratofortresses bomb the Fishhook in Cambodia in an attack on what the Americans believe to be the general Communist headquarters within Cambodia. It is the first event in Operation Menu, the secret 14-month-long American bombing of Cambodia targeting North Vietnamese Army sanctuaries there.
- March 18–19 – The Royal Air Force airlifts 300 troops to Anguilla in response to the civil unrest that had broken out on the island.
- March 19 – To celebrate his 26th birthday, Douglas Alton Dickey draws a .22-caliber pistol aboard Delta Air Lines Flight 918 – a Convair CV-880 flying from Dallas, Texas, to New Orleans, Louisiana, with 97 people on board – and demands that it fly him to Cuba. He agrees to allow the passengers to disembark at New Orleans first. As they do, one of them, a U.S. Federal Bureau of Investigation agent, overpowers Dickey and arrests him.
- March 20 – A United Arab Airlines Ilyushin Il-18 crashes and bursts into flames while attempting to land in blowing sand at Aswan Airport outside Aswan, Egypt, killing 100 of the 105 people on board and injuring all five survivors.
- March 25 – A hijacker commandeers Delta Air Lines Flight 821, a Douglas DC-8 flying from Dallas, Texas, to San Diego, California, with 114 people on board, and forces it to fly to Cuba.

=== April ===
- April 1 – Air Jamaica begins flight operations.
- April 2 – LOT Polish Airlines Flight 165, an Antonov An-24W, crashes during a snowstorm on the northern slope of Polica mountain near Zawoja, Poland, killing all 53 people on board.
- April 11 – Three hijackers commandeer a Douglas DC-6 airliner flying from Guayaquil to Quito, Ecuador, with 59 people on board and force it to fly to Havana, Cuba.
- April 13 – Four hijackers take control of Pan American World Airways Flight 460, a Boeing 727 flying from San Juan, Puerto Rico, to Miami, Florida, with 91 people on board and force it to fly to Cuba.
- April 14 – Three hijackers commandeer a SAM Colombia Douglas C-54G-1-DO Skymaster (registration HK-1065) with 29 people on board, during a domestic flight in Colombia from Santa Marta to Barranquilla and force it to fly to Havana, Cuba.
- April 15 – A North Korean MiG-17 (NATO reporting name "Fresco") shoots down a U.S. Air Force EC-121M Warning Star reconnaissance aircraft over the Sea of Japan, killing all 31 men on board.
- April 27 – President of Bolivia René Barrientos dies when his helicopter strikes high-tension lines and crashes in the canyon of the Arque River near Arque, Bolivia.
- April 28 – Concentrating excessively on their flight director instrument and using it incorrectly, the flight crew of LAN Chile Flight 160, a Boeing 727, neglects to check its instruments and fails to notice that the aircraft has descended below its intended glidepath. The aircraft strikes the ground near Colina, Chile, and is destroyed in the crash that follows, although all 60 people on board survive.
- April 30 – A Seaboard World Airlines Douglas DC-8 with 219 passengers and 13 crewmembers lands by mistake at South Vietnam's Marble Mountain Air Facility when it had actually been cleared to land at the nearby Da Nang Air Base. After fuel and passengers are offloaded, the plane is towed to the north overrun and departs five hours after landing.

=== May ===
- May 4–11 – The Daily Mail Transatlantic Air Race commemorates the 50th anniversary of Alcock and Brown's crossing. It is won by a Royal Navy F-4 Phantom II, taking 4 hours 47 minutes to fly from Floyd Bennett Field in New York City to Wisley Airfield near London.
- May 5 – Wanted in Canada for a series of bomb attacks and armed with a revolver, 22-year-old Front de libération du Québec ("Quebec Liberation Front") member Alain Allard joins with an older comrade in hijacking National Airlines Flight 91 – a Boeing 727 flying from New York City to Miami, Florida, with 75 people on board – when it is about 40 miles (64 km) north of Miami. They force the plane to fly to Havana, Cuba.
- May 7 – The airline NAYSA begins operations.
- May 9 – The first supersonic flight of a lifting body takes place, when test pilot John A. Manke, flying for the National Aeronautics and Space Administration (NASA) Flight Research Center at Edwards Air Force Base, California, reaches 1,197 km/h (744 mph; 646 kn) during the 17th flight of the Northrop HL-10. The flight lasts 6 minutes 50 seconds and reaches an altitude of 16.25 km (10.10 mi; 53,300 ft).
- May 10 – The United States Army′s 101st Airborne Division (Airmobile), the U.S. 9th Marine Regiment, and the South Vietnamese Army's 3rd Regiment begin Operation Apache Snow in South Vietnam's A Shau Valley with a helicopter assault on North Vietnamese forces. It will lead to the Battle of Hamburger Hill.
- May 20 – Three passengers hijack an Avianca Boeing 737-159 with 55 people on board making a domestic flight in Colombia from Bogotá to Pereira and order it to fly to Cuba. After a refueling stop at Barranquilla, Colombia, the airliner flies lies to Havana.
- May 26
  - Three hijackers commandeer Northeast Airlines Flight 6, a Boeing 727 with 20 people on board flying from Miami, Florida, to New York City, and forces it to fly to Cuba.
  - The U.S. Army cancels the Lockheed AH-56 Cheyenne attack helicopter program, worth $US 900 million.
- May 30 – A lone hijacker aboard a Texas International Airlines Convair CV-600 with 44 people on board flying from New Orleans to Alexandria, Louisiana, demands to be flown to Cuba.

=== June ===
- June 4
  - Two hijackers commandeer a Divisão dos Transportes Aéreos (DTA) Douglas DC-3 during a domestic flight in Portuguese Angola from N'zeto to Santo António do Zaire and force it to fly to Pointe-Noire in the Republic of the Congo.
  - Mexicana Flight 704, a Boeing 727-64, crashes on approach to Monterrey, Mexico, killing all 79 people on board. Among the dead is Mexican tennis star Rafael Osuna.
- June 5
  - The American bombing of North Vietnam resumes after a seven-month pause.
  - The Tupolev Tu-144 makes its first supersonic flight.
  - The U.S. Air Force's one-of-a-kind Boeing RC-135E Rivet Amber reconnaissance aircraft crashes in the Bering Sea, killing all 19 men on board.
- June 17 – Black Panther Party member William Lee Brent hijacks Trans World Airlines Flight 154, a Boeing 707 with 89 people on board flying from Oakland, California, to New York City and forces it to take him to Havana, Cuba. He will reside in Cuba until his death in 2006.
- June 18 – Three members of the Eritrean Liberation Front attack an Ethiopian Airlines Boeing 707 on the ground at Karachi, Pakistan, claiming that they wished to publicize their opposition to Ethiopian rule in Eritrea. They damage the aircraft, but no one is injured in the attack.
- June 20 – Three passengers hijack Líneas Aéreas La Urraca Flight 801, a Douglas C-47A-DL Skytrain (registration HK-500) with 25 people on board making a domestic flight in Colombia from Monterrey to Aguazul and demand that it fly them to Cuba. After stops at Barrancabermeja and Barranquilla, Colombia, the airliner flies to Santiago de Cuba in Cuba.
- June 22 – Three hijackers commandeer Eastern Airlines Flight 7, a Douglas DC-8 with 89 people on board flying from Newark, New Jersey, to Miami, Florida, and force it to fly them to Cuba.
- June 25 – Shortly after takeoff from Los Angeles, California, a hijacker takes control of United Airlines Flight 14, a Douglas DC-8 with 58 people on board flying to John F. Kennedy International Airport in New York City while it is over Riverside, California, and forces it to fly to Havana, Cuba.
- June 28 – Armed only with a penknife, 55-year-old Raymond Anthony hijacks Eastern Airlines Flight 173 – a Boeing 727 with 104 people on board flying from Baltimore, Maryland, to Tampa, Florida – and forces it to fly to Havana, Cuba, saying that he is dressed in Bermuda shorts and sandals so that he can go to the beach as soon as he gets there. Cuban authorities jail him until they return him to the United States in November.

=== July ===
- The Royal Air Force's No. 1 Squadron becomes the first operational fixed-wing vertical-take-off-or-landing (VTOL) squadron in the world.
- Prince Souvanna Phouma of Laos announces that he had authorized American bombing of the Ho Chi Minh Trail in Laos.
- July 1 – The Grumman Aircraft Engineering Corporation becomes the Grumman Aerospace Corporation.
- July 3 – Thirteen hijackers aboard a SAETA Douglas DC-3 during a domestic flight in Ecuador from Tulcán to Quito demand to be flown to Cuba.
- July 10
  - A 16-year-old boy attempts to hijack Avianca Flight 654, a Douglas C-54B-5-DO Skymaster (registration HK-186), about 20 minutes after takeoff from Barranquilla, Colombia, for a domestic flight to Santa Marta and demands that it fly him to Cuba. A crew member and a passenger subdue him, and the airliner returns to Barranquilla.
  - After SAM Colombia Flight 202, a Douglas C-54B-1-DC Skymaster (registration HK-558) with 26 people aboard, begins its descent to Bogotá, Colombia, at the end of a domestic flight from Cali, a hijacker demanding to flown to Cuba attempts to seize control of the plane. He is overpowered, and the airliner lands at Bogotá.
- July 17 – The last air-to-air combat between piston-engined fighters takes place, when Honduran Air Force Colonel Fernando Soto, flying an F4U-5 Corsair fighter, shoots down three Salvadoran Air Force fighters – two FG-1 Corsairs and an F-51 Mustang – during the Football War (or "Soccer War") between El Salvador and Honduras. Soto becomes the only person to score an air-to-air kill during the war, the only person to score three air-to-air kills during a war in the Western Hemisphere, and the last person to score a kill in combat between two propeller-driven aircraft.
- July 20 – Neil Armstrong and Buzz Aldrin became the first and second men to walk on the Moon.
- July 26
  - A wheel-well stowaway inside a Douglas DC-8 survives a flight from Havana, Cuba to Madrid, Spain.
  - Armed with a knife, 28-year-old Joseph Crawford hijacks Continental Air Lines Flight 156, a Douglas DC-9 flying from El Paso to Midand, Texas, and demands that it fly to Havana, Cuba. The airliner stops at Mobile, Alabama, to refuel, then flies to Havana, where it arrives in the predawn hours of July 27. Crawford disembarks at Havana and is imprisoned by Cuban authorities.
  - Two hijackers take control of Mexicana de Aviación Flight 623, a Douglas DC-6 (registration XA-JOT) with 32 people aboard flying from Minatitlán to Villahermosa, Mexico, and force it to fly to Havana, Cuba.
- July 29 – A 24-year-old man dressed in women's clothing draws a gun and attempts to hijack an airliner just after takeoff from Managua, Nicaragua. He is overpowered, and the plane returns to Managua.
- July 31
  - The Eritrean Liberation Front warns travelers not to fly on Ethiopian Airlines.
  - A prisoner escorted by two federal agents aboard Trans World Airlines Flight 79, a Boeing 727 flying from Pittsburgh, Pennsylvania, to Los Angeles, California, with 131 people aboard, grabs a razor blade an uses it to take a female flight attendant hostage. He forces the plane to fly him to Havana, Cuba.

=== August ===
- South Vietnam receives its first fixed-wing gunships when the Republic of Vietnam Air Force's 817th Combat Squadron takes over control of 16 Douglas AC-47 Spooky aircraft transferred from the United States Air Force.
- August 1 – Trans World Airlines initiates transpacific and around-the-world service.
- August 4 – Three passengers hijack an Avianca Douglas DC-4 (registration HK-115) with 68 people on board shortly after it takes off from Santa Marta, Colombia, for a domestic flight to Riohacha and demand to be flown to Cuba. The airliner stops to refuel at Barranquilla, Colombia, before proceeding to Santiago de Cuba in Cuba.
- August 5 – John Scott McReery, a 73-year-old passenger aboard Eastern Airlines Flight 379 – a Douglas DC-9 with 70 people on board flying from Charlotte, North Carolina, to Tampa, Florida – walks into the cockpit shortly after takeoff armed with 5-inch (12.7-cm) straight razor and a knife and says "Let's go to Cuba" to the flight crew. After the pilot tells him that the airliner lacks the fuel to reach Cuba, McReery returns to his seat and acts as if nothing had happened for the rest of the flight. He is arrested after the plane lands in Tampa, and tells the police that he did not actually want to go to Cuba and merely wanted to see if he had the courage to simulate a hijacking. McReery becomes the oldest person to attempt to hijack an aircraft.
- August 11 – Seven hijackers commandeer an Ethiopian Airlines Douglas DC-3 during a domestic flight from Bahir Dar to Addis Ababa, Ethiopia, and force it to fly to Khartoum, Sudan.
- August 14 – Northeast Airlines Flight 43, a Boeing 727 with 52 people on board flying from Boston, Massachusetts, to Miami, Florida, is over the Atlantic Ocean about 40 miles (64 km) east of Jacksonville, Florida, when two male passengers armed with a gun and a knife hijack it. They force it to fly to Havana, Cuba, where they disembark from the plane.
- August 15 – Operation About Face begins in Laos. Air America helicopters airlift Meo and Thai guerrillas led by Vang Pao behind enemy positions while the Royal Lao Army pushes across the Plain of Jars. Heavy American air support peaks at 300 sorties per day.
- August 16
  - Four hijackers take control of an Olympic Airways Douglas DC-3 with 28 people on board making a domestic flight in Greece from Athens to Agrinio and force it to fly to Valona, Albania, where they surrender to authorities.
  - Darryl Greenamyer sets a new piston-engine airspeed record in a heavily modified F8F Bearcat named Conquest I. His record speed of 478 mph (769 km/h) topples the piston-engined speed record set by a pilot in Nazi Germany that had stood since August 1939.
- August 18 – Six hijackers take control of a Misrair Antonov An-24 making a domestic flight in Egypt from Cairo to Luxor. The airliner diverts to El Wagah, Egypt.
- August 23 – Shortly after Avianca Flight 675, a Hawker Siddeley HS-748-245 Series 2A (registration HK-1408) with 27 people on board, takes off from Bucaramanga, Colombia, for a domestic flight to Bogotá, two hijackers commandeer it and demand to be flown to Cuba. The airliner stops to refuel at Barranquilla, Colombia, before proceeding to Santiago de Cuba in Cuba.
- August 29
  - Thinking that Israeli Ambassador to the United States Yitzak Rabin is aboard, two members of the Popular Front for the Liberation of Palestine, Leila Khaled and Salim Issawi, hijack Trans World Airlines Flight 840, a Boeing 707-331B on a flight from Rome, Italy, to Tel Aviv, Israel, with 127 people aboard. Rabin is not aboard, and the hijackers force the plane to land in Damascus, Syria, where they release all the hostages unharmed except for two Israeli passengers and blow up the aircraft's nose section. The two Israelis eventually will be set free unharmed in December.
  - Accompanied by his wife and three children aboard National Airlines Flight 183 – a Boeing 727 with 55 people on board flying from Miami, Florida, to New Orleans, Louisiana – Jorge Caballo enters the cockpit armed with a .32-caliber pistol and forces the airliner to fly to Havana, Cuba, where the family disembarks. It is the 25th U.S. hijacking of 1969.
- August 31 – World champion boxer Rocky Marciano dies along with two other people when the privately owned Cessna 172H Skyhawk in which he is a passenger strikes a lone oak tree and crashes while its inexperienced pilot is attempting to land at night in bad weather at a small airfield outside Newton, Iowa.

=== September ===
- September 1 – Kingdom of Libya Airlines is renamed Libyan Arab Airlines. It will operate under that name until 2006, when it will be renamed Libyan Airlines.
- September 6 – Twelve men and a woman, some armed with machine guns, hijack two TAME airliners making domestic flights in Ecuador – a Douglas DC-3-209 (registration FAE1969) flying from Quito to Manta with 16 people on board and a Douglas C-47-DL Skytrain (registration FAE4341) that also took off from Quito – shooting and killing one crew member and wounding another. They explain to the passengers and crew aboard the two airliners that the hijackings are in retaliation for the deaths of several students in May 1969 during anti-government riots at the University of Guayaquil. They divert both planes to a refueling stop at La Florida Airport in Tumaco, Colombia, where they leave the DC-3 behind, and continue aboard the C-47 to refueling stops at Panama City, Panama, and Kingston, Jamaica, before arriving at Santiago de Cuba in Cuba.
- September 7 – Ninety minutes after takeoff from John F. Kennedy International Airport in New York City, a male passenger pulls a gun and hijacks Eastern Air Lines Flight 925, a Douglas DC-8-61 flying to San Juan, Puerto Rico, with 96 people on board. He forces it to fly to Havana, Cuba.
- September 9 – Allegheny Airlines Flight 853, a McDonnell Douglas DC-9-30, collides in mid-air with a Piper PA-28 near Fairland, Indiana. Both aircraft crash, killing the lone occupant of the PA-28 and all 82 people aboard the DC-9.
- September 10 – A young Puerto Rican man attempts to hijack Eastern Air Lines Flight 929, a Douglas DC-8 flying from John F. Kennedy International Airport in New York City to San Juan, Puerto Rico, with 202 people on board. He demands to be flown to Cuba, but passengers and crew members subdue him, and the airliner lands safely at San Juan.
- September 12 – Philippine Air Lines Flight 158, a BAC One-Eleven, strikes a mango tree in Kula-ike, Antipolo, while on approach to Manila International Airport in Manila, the Philippines. It crashes, killing 45 of the 47 people on board and injuring both survivors. It will be the deadliest accident involving a BAC One-Eleven until 2002.
- September 13
  - Three members of the Eritrean Liberation Front hijack an Ethiopian Airlines Douglas DC-6 flying from Honduras from Addis Ababa, Ethiopia, to Djibouti City, Djibouti, with 44 people on board, and forces it to fly to Aden, South Yemen. An Ethiopian security guard on board shoots and wounds one of the hijackers during the flight to Aden. The authorities arrest the hijackers when the airliner arrives in Aden. One person is killed during the hijacking.
  - A hijacker commandeers a SAHSA Douglas C-47-DL Skytrain (registration HR-SAH) making a domestic flight in Honduras from La Ceiba to Tegucigalpa with 35 people on board and forces it to fly to San Salvador, El Salvador.
- September 16 – Two passengers hijack a Turkish Airlines Vickers 749D Viscount (registration TC-SEC) shortly after it takes off from Istanbul, Turkey, for a domestic flight to Ankara with 61 people on board. They force it to divert to Sofia, Bulgaria.
- September 20 – On approach to Da Nang Airport in Da Nang, South Vietnam, an Air Vietnam Douglas C-54D-10-DC Skymaster (registration XV-NUG) collides with a United States Air Force F-4 Phantom II 3 kilometers (1.9 miles) northwest of the airport. The C-54 crashes into a plowed field, killing 74 of the 75 people on board and two people working in the field.
- September 21 – A Mexicana Boeing 727-64 (registration XA-SEJ) strikes the ground short of the runway on final approach to Mexico City International Airport in Mexico City, Mexico, becomes airborne again, then crashes on a railway embankment, killing 27 of the 118 people on board.
- September 24 – A United States Army sergeant who had boarded at Charleston, South Carolina, hijacks National Airlines Flight 411, a Boeing 727 with 79 people on board, shortly after it takes off from Jacksonville, Florida, to fly to Miami. He forces it to divert to Havana, Cuba.
- September 26 – A Lloyd Aéreo Boliviano Douglas DC-6B (registration CP-698) crashes into the side of Bolivia's Mount Choquetanga, 176 kilometers (109 miles) southeast of La Paz, at an altitude of 15,500 feet (4,700 meters), killing all 79 people on board including 16 members of the Bolivian football (soccer) team The Strongest. The airliner's wreckage is not found until September 29. At the time, it is the deadliest aviation accident in Bolivian history.

=== October ===
- The United States Marshal Service starts a Sky Marshal Division at its Miami Field Office in Miami, Florida.
- October 8
  - A hijacker commandeers an Aerolineas Argentinas Boeing 707-387B (registration LV-ISC) with 68 people on board just before it arrives at Santiago, Chile, at the end of a flight from Buenos Aires, Argentina, and forces it to fly to Havana, Cuba. The airliner then flies to Miami, Florida.
  - Four hijackers take control of a Cruzeiro do Sul Sud Aviation SE 210 Caravelle (registration PP-PDX) with 49 people on board during a domestic flight in Brazil from Belém to Manaus and force it to fly to Havana, Cuba.
- October 9 – A hijacker commandeers National Airlines Flight 42, a Douglas DC-8 with 70 people on board flying from Los Angeles, California, to Miami, Florida, and forces it to fly to Cuba.
- October 19 – Two hijackers take control of a LOT Polish Airlines Antonov An-24B flying from Warsaw, Poland, to East Berlin, East Germany, and force it to divert to Berlin Tegel Airport in West Berlin.
- October 20 – Finnair introduces an inertial navigation system on its aircraft, becoming the first airline to dispense with the need for a navigator aboard.
- October 21 – Enamored with socialism and saying he is opposed to American involvement in the Vietnam War, tired of being "brainwashed" by capitalists, and self-conscious about his appearance, 17-year-old Henry Shorr, who earlier had been denied a visa to visit Cuba by the Cuban embassy in Mexico City, Mexico, draws a small-caliber revolver and hijacks Pan American World Airways Flight 551 – a Boeing 720B flying from Mexico City to Miami, Florida, via Mérida, Mexico, and Tampa, Florida, with 37 people on board, including Florida State Senator Thomas Slade, Jr. – as it is flying over the Yucatán Peninsula. He forces it to fly him to Havana, Cuba. He will commit suicide in Cuba in September 1970 at the age of 18.
- October 28 – An Aerotaxi SA Beechcraft 65-B80 Queen Air (registration HK-1022) with five people aboard is hijacked during a domestic flight in Colombia from Buenaventura to Bogotá and forced to fly to Santiago de Cuba in Cuba.
- October 31 – Facing a court martial for stealing $200 worth of radios and wristwatches from the United States Marine Corps as retribution for $200 in pay he believes his Marine Corps paymaster has shorted him, Raffaele Minichiello uses an M1 Garand rifle to hijack Trans World Airlines Flight 85, a Boeing 707 with 47 people on board flying from Los Angeles to San Francisco, California. He orders it to fly him to New York City, but during a refueling stop at Denver, Colorado – during which he releases the passengers – Minichiello informs the crew that he actually wants the airliner to take him to Rome, Italy. When the jet stops at New York City′s John F. Kennedy International Airport to refuel again, Federal Bureau of Investigation agents wearing bulletproof vests surround the plane, but they back off after he fires his rifle through the plane's roof. The airliner takes off and stops at Bangor, Maine, and Shannon, Ireland, before arriving at Rome, where Minichiello takes a carabinieri officer hostage, steals a police car, and escapes. Arrested at a rural church on November 2, he becomes an Italian folk hero.

=== November ===
- November 4
  - Two hijackers commandeer a LANICA BAC One-Eleven during a flight from Managua, Nicaragua, to San Salvador, El Salvador, demanding to be flown to Cuba. Instead, the airliner diverts to Grand Cayman Island in the Cayman Islands.
  - Six hijackers take control of Varig Flight 863, a Boeing 707-345C (registration PP-VJX) during a flight from Buenos Aires, Argentina, to Santiago, Chile, with 101 people on board and force it to fly to Cuba. Boeing 707 PP-VJX will be hijacked again later the same month.
- November 8 – During a refueling stop at Pajas Blancas Airport in Córdoba, Argentina, a man forces his way aboard an Austral Líneas Aéreas BAC One-Eleven 420EL (registration LV-IZR) preparing to continue its flight to Buenos Aires, Argentina, with 62 people on board. He hijacks the airliner and forces it to fly to Montevideo, Uruguay, where he requests political asylum.
- November 10 – Fourteen-year-old David Booth pulls out a butcher's knife in the terminal building at Cincinnati/Northern Kentucky International Airport in Hebron, Kentucky, takes 18-year-old ballet dancer Gloria Jean House hostage as she passes by, and forces his way aboard Delta Air Lines Flight 670, a Douglas DC-9 preparing to depart for Chicago, Illinois, with 73 people on board. He demands to be flown to Sweden. The pilot taxis the airliner away from the gate before revealing to Booth that the plane lacks the range to fly there. After 90 minutes of negotiations during which Booth demands to be flown to Mexico instead, he releases House and surrenders to police.
- November 12
  - Fiat Aviazione (except for its engine manufacturing section) merges with Aerfer and Salmoiraghi to form Aeritalia, owned equally by Fiat and IRI–Finmeccanica. Aeritalia will become fully operational in January 1972.
  - A hijacker commandeers a Cruzeiro do Sul NAMC YS-11A-202 (registration PP-CTL) during a domestic flight in Brazil from Manaus to Belém and forces it to fly to Havana, Cuba.
  - Two hijackers attempt to take control of a LAN Chile Sud-Aviation SE-210 Caravelle during a domestic flight in Chile from Santiago to Puerto Montt and demand that it fly them to Cuba. The airliner instead lands safely at Antofagasta, Chile.
- November 13 – Six passengers hijack Avianca Flight 637, a Douglas DC-4 (registration HK-728) making a domestic flight in Colombia from Cúcuta to Bogotá with 62 people on board and demand that it fly them to Cuba. After a refueling stop at Barranquilla, Colombia, the airliner flies to Santiago de Cuba in Cuba.
- November 19 – Mohawk Airlines Flight 411, a Fairchild Hiller FH-227B, crashes into Pilot Knob Mountain near the Town of Fort Ann in Washington County, New York, killing all 14 people on board.
- November 20 – Two hijackers commandeer a LOT Polish Airlines Antonov An-24B (registration SP-LTB) flying from Wrocław, Poland, to Bratislava, Czechoslovakia, with 22 people on board and force it to fly them to Vienna, Austria.
- November 29 – A hijacker takes control of Varig Flight 827, a Boeing 707-345C (registration PP-VJX) flying from Paris, France, to Rio de Janeiro, Brazil, and forces it to fly to Havana, Cuba. It is the second time during the month that Boeing 707 PP-VJX has been hijacked.

=== December ===
- The United States Air Force flies its last Douglas AC-47 Spooky fixed-wing gunship mission of the Vietnam War. South Vietnam's Republic of Vietnam Air Force and Laos's Royal Lao Air Force fly all future AC-47 missions during the Southeast Asian conflict.
- December 2 – A hijacker commandeers Trans World Airlines Flight 54, a Boeing 707 with 28 people on board flying from San Francisco, California, to Philadelphia, Pennsylvania, and forces it to fly to Cuba.
- December:
  - Trans World Airlines opens the Breech Academy – also called the Breech Training Academy – in Overland Park, Kansas, for the training of flight attendants, ticket agents, and pilots.
  - Air France Flight 212, a Boeing 707 registered as F-BHSZ, crashed shortly after takeoff from Venezuela killing all 62 occupants onboard. The cause of the accident is not yet known since the Bureau of Enquiry and Analysis for Civil Aviation Safety (BEA) did not publish an investigation report. It will not be released until 2029, sixty years after the accident.
- December 4 – The Tokyo Convention – officially the "Convention on Offences and Certain Other Acts Committed on Board Aircraft" – goes into effect. It establishes that at least one state, specifically the one in which the aircraft is registered, will take jurisdiction over the suspect in the event of an in-flight criminal offense that jeopardizes the safety of an aircraft or people on an aircraft during international air navigation or an intention to commit such an offense, and it provides for situations in which other states may also have jurisdiction. It also recognizes certain powers and immunities of the pilot in command, who on international flights may restrain any person or persons he or she has reasonable cause to believe is committing or is about to commit an offense liable to interfere with the safety of persons or property on board the aircraft or who is jeopardizing good order and discipline aboard the aircraft, the first time this has been recognized in international aviation law.
- December 9 – An Egyptian Air Force MiG-21 (NATO reporting name "Fishbed") shoots down an Israeli Air Force F-4 Phantom II for the first time.
- December 11 – A North Korean agent hijacks a Korean Air Lines NAMC YS-11 with 50 other people on board and forces it to fly to Sǒndǒk Airfield near Wonsan, North Korea. North Korea returns 39 of the passengers to South Korea 66 days later, but never returns the crew of four or the other seven passengers, which is viewed in South Korea as an example of North Korean abductions of South Koreans.
- December 12 – Thirty minutes after an Ethiopian Airlines Boeing 707 takes off from Madrid, Spain, bound for Athens, Greece, Eritrean Liberation Front member Hamed Shenen gets up from his seat with a handgun and orders the flight crew to fly the plane to Aden in South Yemen. The pilot explains that the plane will have to refuel at Rome, but does not receive permission to land there, and a plainclothes security guard then enters the cockpit and shoots Shenen, after which a second security guard shoots Shenen six more times, killing him. Shenen's accomplice Mahmoud Suliman rushes toward the cockpit armed with a knife, and the security guards shoot him to death as well. It is the first time that aircraft hijackers have been killed aboard a plane in flight. The plane's 15 passengers celebrate the hijackers′ deaths by drinking champagne, and the airliner lands safely in Athens. The Eritrean Liberation Front claims responsibility for the hijacking, saying that the hijackers merely intended to hand out propaganda leaflets to the passengers.
- December 18 – The England-Australia Commemorative Air Race is flown in commemoration of the 50th anniversary of the Smith brothers' flight. It is won by W. J. Bright and F. L. Buxton in a Britten-Norman Islander.
- December 19 – A hijacker commandeers a LAN Chile Boeing 727-116 with 96 people on board making a domestic fight in Chile from Santiago to Arica and forces it to fly to Havana, Cuba.
- December 20 – The highest-scoring North Vietnamese ace of the Vietnam War, Nguyễn Văn Cốc, scores his final victory, claimed as over an AQM-34 Firebee unmanned aerial vehicle but possibly over an OV-10 Bronco. The North Vietnamese Air Force credits him with nine victories, while the United States confirms seven.
- December 21 – Three members of the People's Front for the Liberation of Palestine are caught trying to board a Trans World Airlines Boeing 707 at Athens, Greece, for a flight to Rome and New York City with guns and dynamite in their hand luggage. They had planned to hijack the airliner, divert it to Tunis in Tunisia, and blow it up to protest the support of the United States for Israel.
- December 22 – An explosion in the lavatory of an Air Vietnam Douglas DC-6B in mid-flight damages the braking system. When the aircraft lands at Nha Trang Airport in Nha Trang, South Vietnam, it goes off the end of the runway and strikes a concrete pylon, dwellings, and a school, killing 10 of the 77 people on board and 24 people on the ground, and injuring many more.
- December 23 – A hijacker takes control of a LACSA Curtiss C-46 Commando during a domestic flight in Costa Rica from Puerto Limón to San José and forces it to fly to San Andreas, Cuba.
- December 26 – A hijacker commandeers United Airlines Flight 929, a Boeing 727 with 32 people on board flying from New York City to Chicago, Illinois, and forces it to fly to Cuba.

== First flights ==
- Lockheed YO-3

=== January ===
- January 3 – SOCATA ST 60

=== February ===
- February 9 – Boeing 747
- February 12 – Mil Mi V-12

=== March ===
- Aero Boero AB-115
- March 2 – BAC-Aérospatiale Concorde
- March 17 – Aérospatiale SA 315B Lama

=== April ===
- Bell UH-1N Iroquois "Twin Huey"
- April 3 – Robin HR100
- April 16 – Let L-410 Turbolet
- April 17 – Martin Marietta X-24A (unpowered)
- April 24 – Anderson Kingfisher

=== May ===
- May 1 – Gazuit-Valladeau GV-103
- May 7 – Westland Sea King
- May 13 – Conroy Turbo Three
- May 19 – Beagle B.125 Bulldog
- May 30 - ICA IS-23

=== June ===
- Beechcraft Baron Model 58
- June 27 – Interceptor 400

=== July ===
- July 1 – Sukhoi Su-17 (NATO reporting name "Fitter-C")

=== August ===
- August 18 – Cierva CR Twin G-AWRP
- August 25 – Fairchild Swearingen Metroliner
- August 30 – Tupolev Tu-22M

=== September ===
- Antonov An-14M, prototype of the Antonov An-28 ("Cash")
- September 15 – Cessna FanJet500, the prototype which led to the Cessna Citation.
- September 19 – Mil Mi-24, the most widely exported helicopter gunship.

== Entered service ==
- Lockheed YO-3 with the United States Army
- Mid-1969 – Beriev Be-30 (NATO reporting name "Cuff") with Aeroflot

=== March ===
- Fokker F.28 Fellowship with Braathens SAFE

=== May ===
- May 23 – Bell OH-58 Kiowa with United States Army

=== August ===
- Beechcraft King Air Model 100

=== October ===
- October 2 – Hawker-Siddeley Nimrod

== Retirements ==
- Northrop F-89 Scorpion by the United States Air National Guard

=== February ===
- February 4 – North American XB-70 Valkyrie by the United States Air Force

== Deadliest crash ==
The deadliest crash of this year was Viasa Flight 742, a McDonnell Douglas DC-9 which crashed shortly after takeoff from Maracaibo, Venezuela on 16 March, killing all 84 people on board, as well as 71 on the ground. This was the deadliest civil accident in the 1960s decade, and was at the time the world's deadliest civil aviation disaster.
