= SITAR GY-90 Mowgli =

GY-90 Mowgli

General information
- Type: civil utility aircraft
- National origin: France
- Manufacturer: SITAR for homebuilding
- Designer: Yves Gardan

The SITAR GY-90 Mowgli was a light aircraft designed in France in the late 1960s and marketed for homebuilding. Designer Yves Gardan intended it to be a smaller and simpler version of his Bagheera, a conventional low-wing, cantilever monoplane with fixed tricycle undercarriage and a fully enclosed cabin. However, although the Bagheera had seating for up to four people in 2+2 configuration, the Mowgli had no rear seat and could seat only two people, with space behind the seats for luggage. Like the Bagheera, construction was of metal throughout. The Mowgli was designed to use either a 67-kW (90-hp) or 75-kW (100-hp) Continental flat-4 engine.

The Mowgli was available in the form of plans and kits, and plans continued to be available even after SITAR closed in 1972. The first example was expected to fly in 1970.

== Specifications (as designed, with 67-kW engine) ==
Data from Jane's All the World's Aircraft 1971–72

General characteristics

- Crew: 1
- Capacity: 1passenger
- Wingspan: 7.20 m (23 ft 7 in)
- Wing area: 10.00 m^{2} (107.6 sq ft)
- Aspect ratio: 5.2:1
- Empty weight: 380 kg (838 lb)
- Max takeoff weight: 630 kg (1,389 lb)
- Powerplant: 1 × Continental air-cooled flat-four engine, 67 kW (90 hp)

Performance

- Maximum speed: 225 km/h (140 mph, 121 kn) at sea level(75% power)
- Range: 800 km (500 mi, 430 nmi)
- Service ceiling: 4,000 m (13,000 ft)
- Rate of climb: 4 m/s (790 ft/min)
