= Gatard Statoplan Pigeon =

AG 04 Pigeon

General information
- Type: Utility aircraft
- Manufacturer: Homebuilt
- Designer: Albert Gatard

History
- First flight: 1976

The Gatard Statoplan AG 04 Pigeon was a light utility aircraft developed in France in the 1970s. It was a high-wing strut-braced monoplane with fixed tailwheel undercarriage. The wings could be quickly folded to facilitate storage or towing. As with Gatard's previous Poussin, the Pigeon was built around an unconventional flight control system that relied on varying its wings' camber to provide most of its climb, rather than their angle of attack. A prototype, registered F-WYBB flew in 1976, and although it was intended to market the design to homebuilders, this did not transpire.

== Specifications ==
General characteristics

- Crew: one pilot
- Capacity: three passengers or one stretcher
- Length: 6.00 m (19 ft 8 in)
- Wingspan: 9.00 m (29 ft 6 in)
- Wing area: 11.8 m^{2} (127 sq ft)
- Empty weight: 398 kg (877 lb)
- Gross weight: 715 kg (1,576 lb)
- Powerplant: 1 × Continental C90 , 67 kW (90 hp)

Performance

- Cruise speed: 170 km/h (105 mph, 91 kn)
