= SITAR GY-110 Sher Khan =

Light aircraft

GY-110 Sher Khan

General information
- Type: Civil utility aircraft
- National origin: France
- Manufacturer: SITAR
- Designer: Yves Gardan

The SITAR GY-110 Sher Khan was a light aircraft designed in France in the late 1960s as a larger and more powerful version of designer Yves Gardan's Bagheera. Like the Bagheera, it was to be a conventional low-wing, cantilever monoplane with a fully enclosed cabin. However, although the Bagheera had seating for up to four people in 2+2 configuration, the Sher Khan was to have a stretched fuselage with full seating for four people. The wingspan was also to be enlarged, and unlike the Bagheera, whose tricycle undercarriage was fixed, the Sher Khan's was to be retractable.

Power was to be supplied by engines in the 150-kW to 240-kW (200-hp to 300-hp) range.

== Specifications (as designed) ==
Data from Taylor 1971, p.78

General characteristics

- Crew: one pilot
- Capacity: three passengers
- Powerplant: 1 × piston engine , 150–240 kW (200–300 hp)
