= General-Western P-2 Meteor =

Meteor
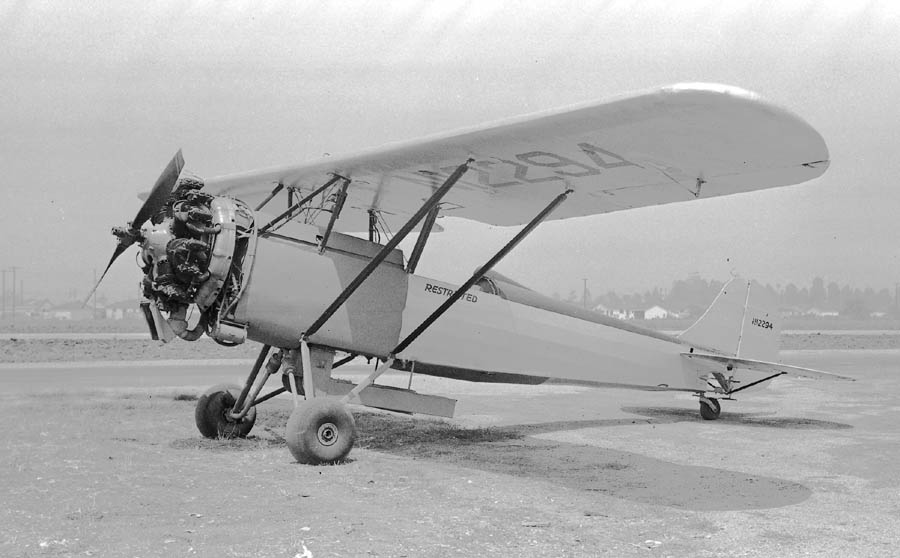

General information
- Type: Parasol aircraft
- National origin: United States
- Manufacturer: General-Western Aero Corp
- Designer: Albin Peterson
- Number built: 6

History
- Introduction date: 1932

The General-Western Meteor, also called the Air Transport Mfg Meteor, Phantom Meteor and the Bantam Meteor was a parasol wing aircraft.

== Design and development ==
The P-2-S was built at Goleta Airport after development of the P-1 at the General-Western plant at Santa Barbara Municipal airport. It received its American type certificate on 6 May 1932. The aircraft was one of the earliest examples built with all-metal propellers. Rights to the design were sold to the Air Transport Mfg Co. in 1935

The P-2-S is a high-wing, conventional landing gear equipped, parasol-wing aircraft powered by a 100 hp (75 kW) Kinner radial engine.

== Operational history ==
The prototype was destroyed in testing in 1930.

== Variants ==
P-1
single seat prototype
P-2-S
Two seat sport model
P-2-T
Trainer model
Crop duster

- One example was modified into a cropduster with a 220 hp (164 kW) Continental engine upgrade.

== Specifications (General-Western P-2-S Meteor) ==
Data from American airplane specifications

General characteristics

- Crew: 1
- Capacity: 1 passenger
- Length: 24 ft 2 in (7.37 m)
- Wingspan: 32 ft 0 in (9.75 m)
- Height: 7 ft 10 in (2.39 m)
- Wing area: 146.8 sq ft (13.64 m^{2})
- Empty weight: 1,137 lb (516 kg)
- Gross weight: 1,750 lb (794 kg)
- Powerplant: 1 × Kinner K-5 radial engine, 100 hp (75 kW)

Performance

- Maximum speed: 130 mph (210 km/h, 110 kn)
- Cruise speed: 105 mph (169 km/h, 91 kn)
- Stall speed: 40 mph (64 km/h, 35 kn)
- Range: 420 mi (680 km, 360 nmi)
