= General Aviation PJ =

1933 flying boat series

PJ
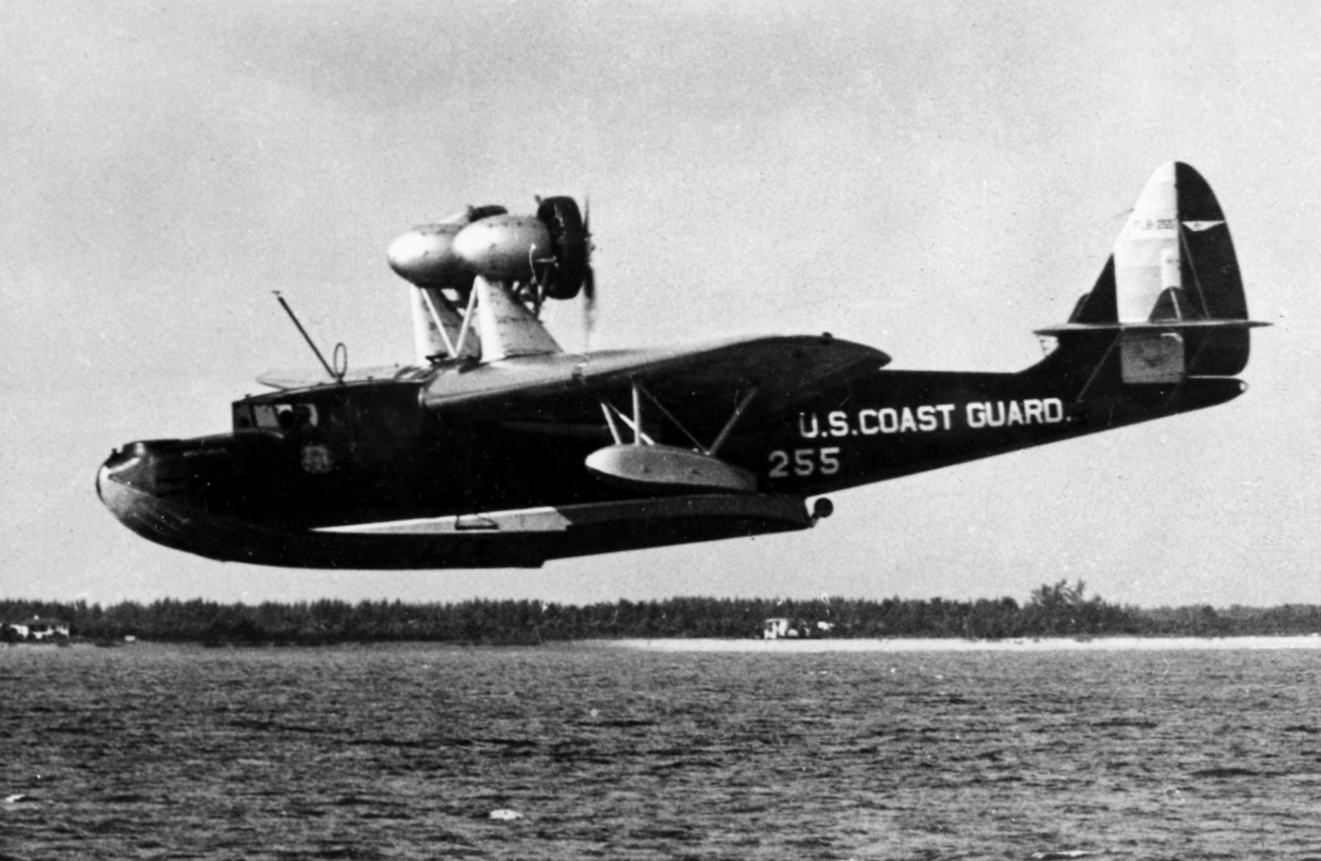
- PJ-1 Arcturus off CGAS Miami in 1934

General information
- Type: Air-sea rescue aircraft
- National origin: United States of America
- Manufacturer: General Aviation
- Primary user: United States Coast Guard
- Number built: 5

History
- First flight: 1933
- Retired: 1941

The General Aviation PJ was a flying boat produced in the United States in the 1930s as a search-and-rescue aircraft for the Coast Guard. Five were built, with one converted to be a PJ-2 with engines in the other direction. The aircraft would land and take-off on water, but did have some wheels for when it was brought up on land from the water. They were in service until August 1941.

Each of the five aircraft was named for stars. General Aviation was the then-new name for Fokker America, after it was purchased by General Motors; the other designation for this design was the AF-15. It was also called the FLB for Flying Life Boat.

== Design ==
Originally designated FLB (for "Flying Life Boat"), it was a conventional high-wing cantilever monoplane with a flying boat hull and outrigger pontoons mounted on the wings slightly outboard of mid-span. The twin pusher engines were carried in separate nacelles on pylons above the wings. The hull was a monocoque metal structure, and the wing was a wooden structure skinned with plywood. The basic design was based on that of the Fokker F.11, but substantially enlarged (Fokker's American operation was renamed General Aviation after purchase by General Motors in 1930). While not a true amphibian and able to land on dry land, the PJ was equipped with retractable undercarriage that functioned as its own, self-carrying beaching trolley.

== Operational history ==
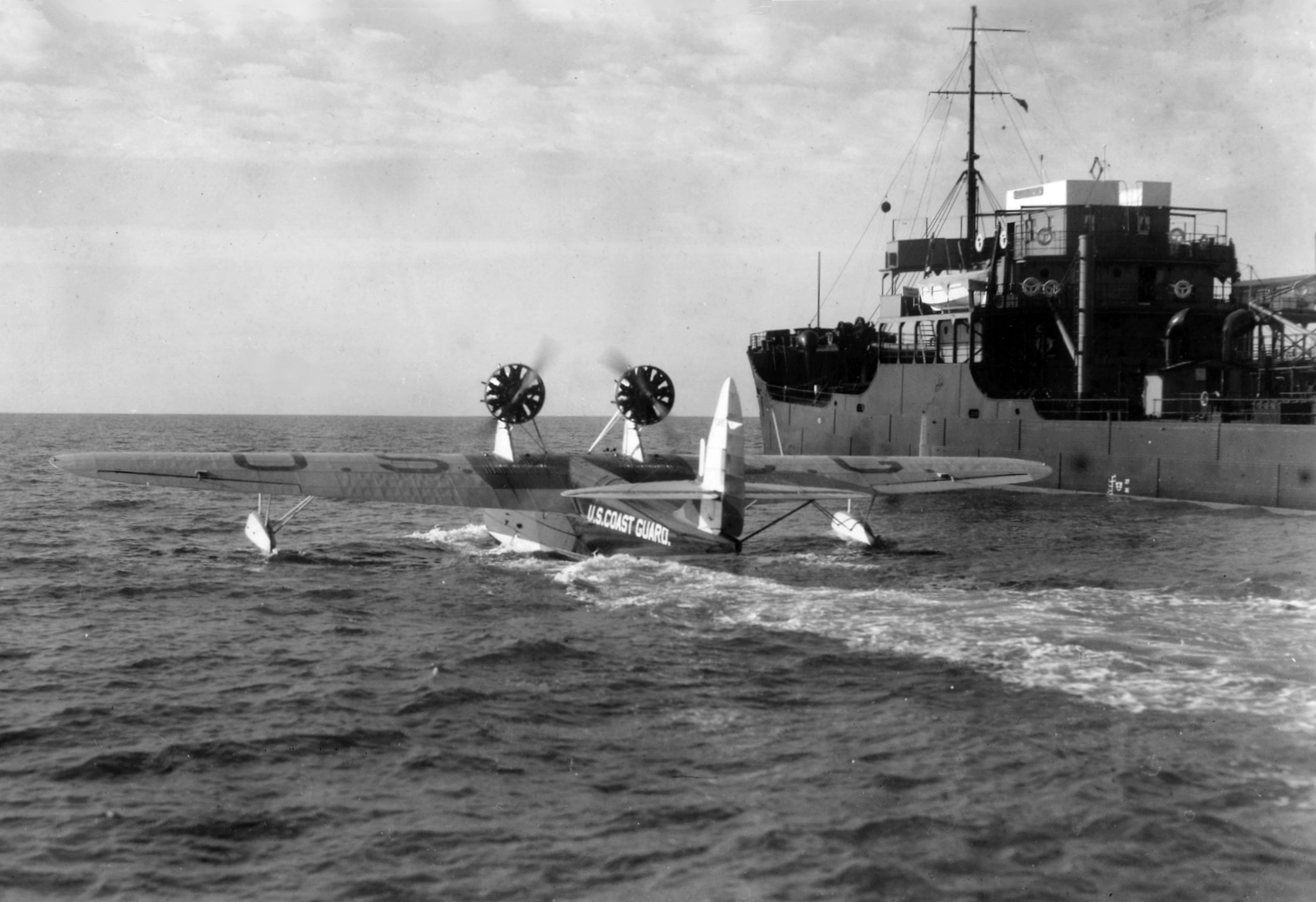
PJ-1 on water

Five examples were operated by the US Coast Guard during the 1930s, named Antares, Altair, Acrux, Acamar, and Arcturus (hull numbers FLB-51 through FLB-55). In 1933, Antares underwent a major refit that included a redesign of her engine nacelles, converting these to tractor configuration.

They were retired in August 1941.

== Variants ==
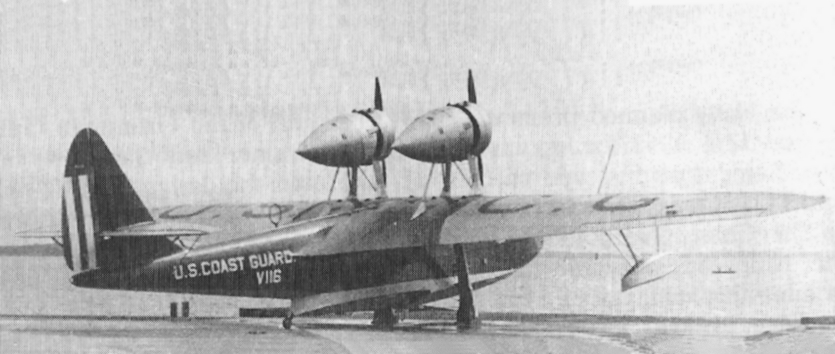
Here is the PJ-2 with the engines facing in the other direction as the PJ-1

- PJ-1 - original version with pusher engines (five built)
- PJ-2 - version with tractor engines (one converted)

== Specifications (PJ-1) ==
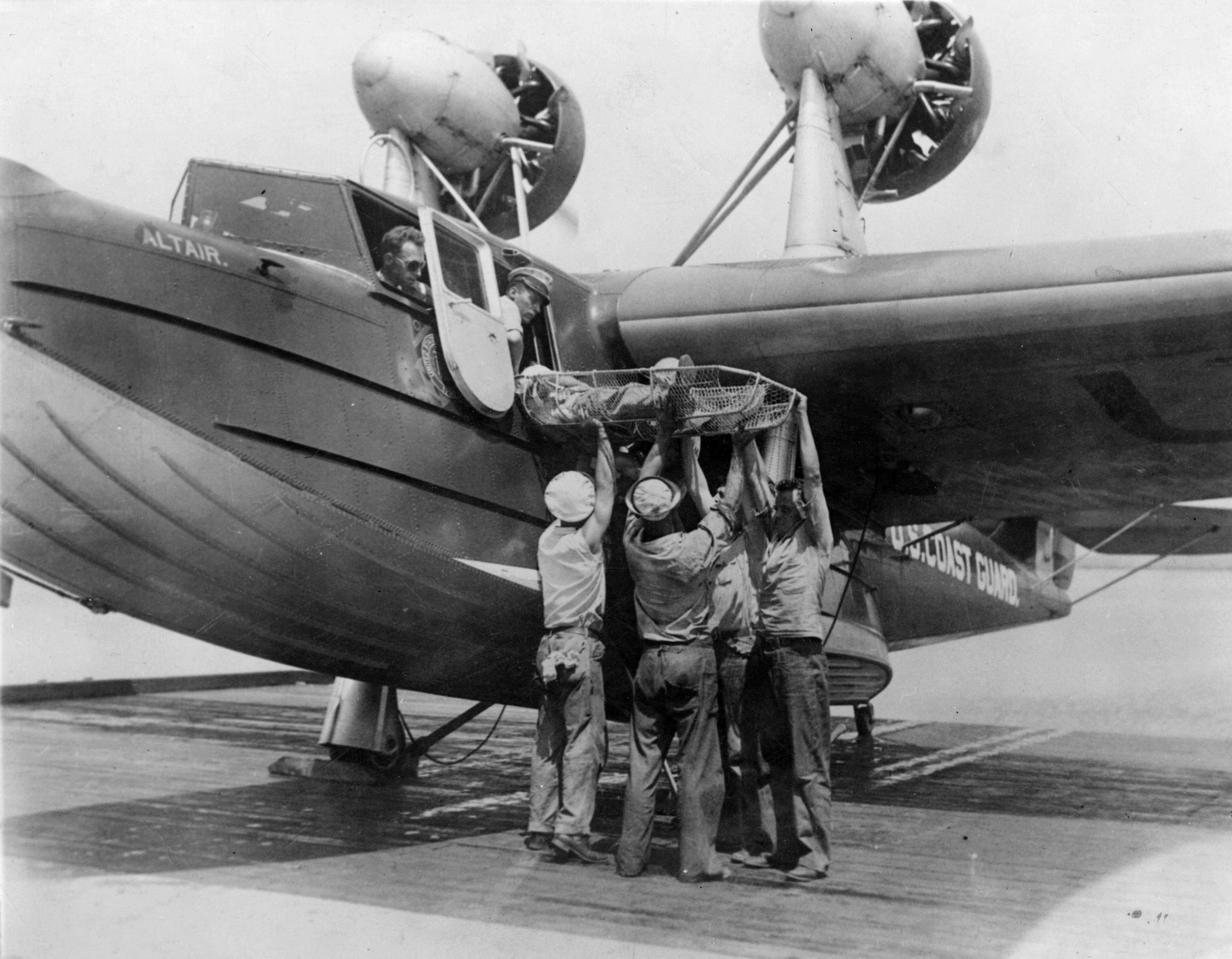
PJ-1 Altair unloading a patient in a stretcher

General characteristics

- Crew: Four - two pilots, navigator, and radio operator
- Length: 53 ft 9 in (16.39 m)
- Wingspan: 74 ft 2 in (22.61 m)
- Height: 15 ft 6 in (4.73 m)
- Wing area: 754 sq ft (70.0 m^{2})
- Empty weight: 7,000 lb (3,180 kg)
- Gross weight: 11,200 lb (5,090 kg)
- Powerplant: 2 × Pratt & Whitney R-1340 Wasp , 420 hp (310 kW) each

Performance

- Maximum speed: 130 mph (208 km/h, 110 kn)
- Range: 1,100 mi (1,770 km, 960 nmi)
- Service ceiling: 9,000 ft (2,745 m)
