= Gabriel P 6 =

General information
- Type: Training aircraft
- National origin: Poland
- Manufacturer: Pawel and Jan Gabriel
- Designer: Pawel Gabriel
- Number built: 1

History
- First flight: late May 1924

The Gabriel P 6 was a Polish training aircraft and the P 7 a tourer. The difference between them was the wing configuration, chosen to optimise their speed range for their role, so the P 6 was a biplane and the P 7 a parasol wing aircraft.

== Design and development ==
After their first powered design, the single seat P 5, the Gabriel brothers considered the different requirements of two seat trainers and tourers. Both needed to handle well, ideally with similar characteristics, but the trainer required lower landing speeds and the tourer higher cruise speeds. They decided that economical solutions would share engines, fuselages, landing gears and wings but that the trainer should be a biplane with a cantilever lower wing and the tourer, without the lower wing, a parasol wing monoplane. The same airframe was flown in both the biplane (P 6) and parasol (P 7) configurations. Like the Gabriel P 5, the new aircraft was strongly influenced by the Fokker D.VII.

The P 6 was an all wood aircraft. Both of its wings were tapered in plan and were built around two spars with plywood covering. The upper wing was mounted over the fuselage by a cabane of inverted V-struts from the upper fuselage and braced on each side with a parallel pair of struts from the spars to the lower longeron. The lower wing was attached to the lower longerons.

The trainer was powered by a 48–52 kW (65–70 hp) four cylinder, water-cooled inline Mercedes engine. The forward part of its rectangular section fuselage was covered with aluminium sheet and the rest with plywood. There were two cockpits in tandem, equipped with dual control though with flight instruments only in the rear seat. Its empennage was externally braced, with ply-covered fin and tailplane carrying fabric covered control surfaces.

Its fixed landing gear, with a track of 1.6 m (5 ft 3 in), was of the tailskid type, with mainwheels on a single axle held via rubber ring shock absorbers on V-struts from the lower longerons.

The Gabriel P 6, the first Polish designed two seat trainer, was flown for the first time in late May 1924, piloted by Jan Gabriel at Bydgoszcz. It was subsequently tested by pilots from the Bydgoszcz pilot's school, who reported that it handled well.

Later in 1924 the lower wing was removed, a straightforward alteration in the absence of interplane struts, and the aircraft was flown successfully as the Gabriel P 7. With only 63% of the P 6's wing area but slightly lighter the P 7 had both maximum and landing speeds that were 20 km/h (12 mph; 11 kn) faster than the P 6.

The Polish aeronautical authorities showed no more interest in the P 6 and P 7 than they had in the P 5. No funding was gained and, although Pawel Gabriel had designed a new high wing, low power ultralight, the P 7 was the Gabriels' last aircraft to fly.

== Variants ==
P 6
Biplane trainer.
P 7
Parasol wing tourer with P 6's lower wing discarded.

== Specifications (P 6) ==
Data from Cynk (1971) except where noted

General characteristics

- Crew: One student, one instructor
- Length: 5.8 m (19 ft 0 in)
- Wingspan: 8.6 m (28 ft 3 in)
- Height: 2.1 m (6 ft 11 in)
- Wing area: 16.5 m^{2} (178 sq ft)
- Empty weight: 480 kg (1,058 lb)
- Gross weight: 720 kg (1,587 lb)
- Fuel capacity: 120 L (26 imp gal; 32 US gal)
- Powerplant: 1 × Mercedes 4-cylinder, water-cooled inline, 48–52 kW (65–70 hp)
- Propellers: 2-bladed Gabriel, wooden

Performance

- Maximum speed: 175 km/h (109 mph, 94 kn)
- Cruise speed: 150 km/h (93 mph, 81 kn)
- Stall speed: 60 km/h (37 mph, 32 kn)
- Range: 1,100 km (680 mi, 590 nmi)
- Service ceiling: 3,000 m (9,800 ft)
- Rate of climb: 2.6 m/s (510 ft/min)
- Landing speed: 60 km/h (37 mph; 32 kn)
