= Gidroplan Tsikada =

Tsikada
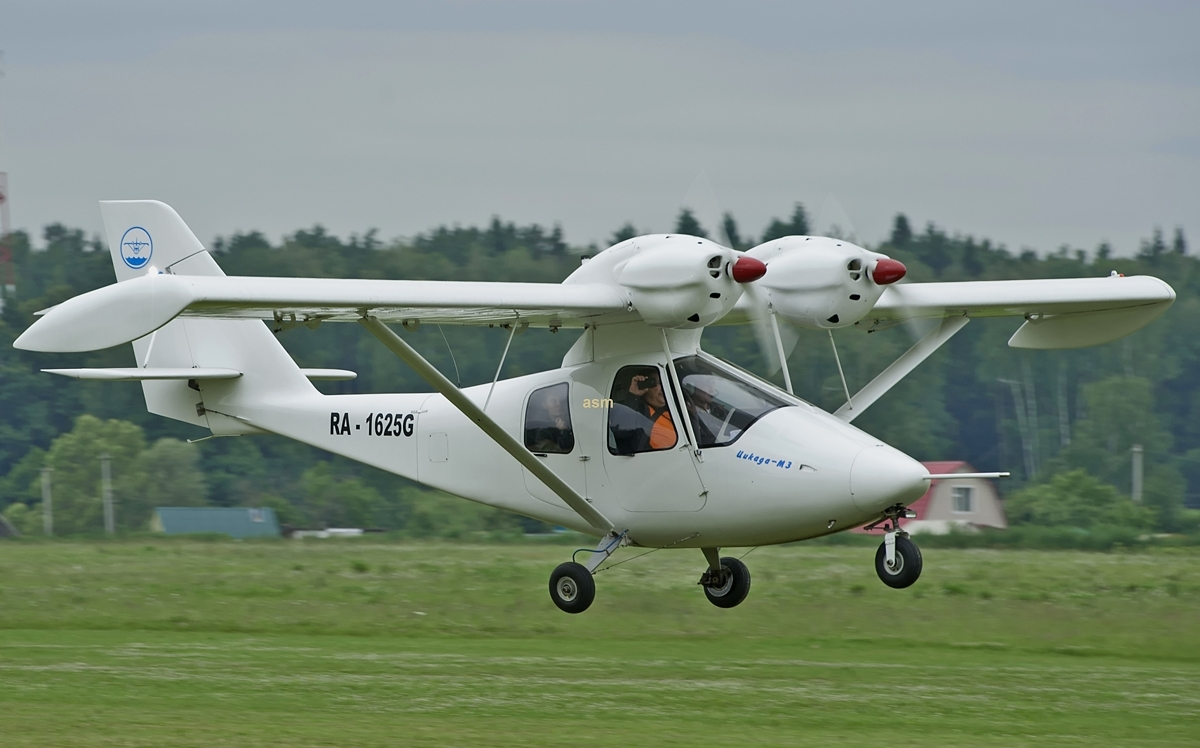

General information
- Type: Utility and agricultural aircraft
- National origin: Russia
- Manufacturer: Gidroplan LLC
- Number built: 6 of two-seat versions

History
- First flight: c.2000

The Gidroplan Tsikada (Гидроплан Цикада or Hydroplane Cicada) is a light, twin engined utility aircraft, seating two or four in different variants, developed in Russia since about 2000.

== Design and development ==
At different times and in different places the Tsikada or Sky Wind series has been marketed either under the company name, Gidroplan, or under its English translation, Hydroplane. The earliest Tsikada was shown in 2000 and was a high-wing monoplane, with twin engines mounted above and forward of the wing leading edge. This arrangement has been maintained through later versions. The original aircraft was a two seater with two doors, powered by 48 kW (64 hp) Rotax 582 engines. It was followed in 2007 by the Tsikada-M or Sky Wind 1, which had more powerful Jabiru engines and modifications to the fuselage and cabin, the undercarriage and the control systems.

A four-seat prototype, the Tsikada-3M, preceded a four-seat, four-door, four-window production version known as the Tskiada-4 or Sky Wind-AT, which is 400 mm (15.7 in) longer than before. The earlier flaperons were replaced with separate flaps and ailerons. The prototype finished flight trials in July 2009 and the Tsikada-4 was first flown in August, followed by production the following year.

The Tsikada has a metal wing, rectangular in plan and with small downturned tips. The engines are mounted over the wing as close together as the propeller discs allow. They, and the wing centre section are supported over the fuselage by a short cabane; a single faired strut on each side braces the wing to the lower fuselage, assisted by a jury strut. The composite skinned fuselage has one or two rows of side by side seats, each with a pair of side windows in the doors, behind a single piece windscreen. There is a baggage compartment with a maximum load of 40 kg (88 lb). Aft of the cabin the fuselage tapers, with an upswept underside, to a tall swept fin and balanced rudder. The rectangular tailplane, externally braced from above and carrying separate, unbalanced elevators with a cut-out for rudder movement, is mounted on the fin a little above the fuselage. The tricycle undercarriage has mainwheels on sprung cantilever legs and a steerable oleo sprung nose wheel. A chemical hopper with underwing spray bar and discharge chute from the central fuselage underside is an option.

== Operational history ==
Three Tsikada-Ms were supplied to Cuba, the first for anti-mosquito spraying, between 2008 and 2010. In all, six two-seat Tsikadas were built.

== Variants ==
Tsikada
Original Rotax powered two-seater
Tsikada-M (Sky Wind-1)
Jabiru powered two-seater
Tsikada-M3
Four seat Tsikada-4 development aircraft
Tsikada-4 (Sky Wind-AT)
Four seat, Jabiru powered

== Specifications (Tsikada-4) ==
Data from Jane's All the World's Aircraft 2013-14, p. 522

General characteristics

- Capacity: Four
- Length: 7.40 m (24 ft 3 in)
- Wingspan: 11.30 m (37 ft 1 in)
- Height: 2.92 m (9 ft 7 in)
- Wing area: 15.70 m^{2} (169.0 sq ft)
- Aspect ratio: 8.1
- Empty weight: 526 kg (1,160 lb)
- Max takeoff weight: 950 kg (2,094 lb)
- Fuel capacity: 100 L (22.0 Imp gal; 26.4 US gal)
- Powerplant: 2 × Jabiru 2200 air-cooled flat four engine, 60 kW (80 hp) each
- Propellers: 2-bladed, 1.55 m (5 ft 1 in) diameter

Performance

- Maximum speed: 189 km/h (117 mph, 102 kn)
- Cruise speed: 150 km/h (93 mph, 81 kn)
- Stall speed: 63 km/h (39 mph, 34 kn)
- Range: 650 km (400 mi, 350 nmi)
- Service ceiling: 3,000 m (9,800 ft)
- g limits: +3.8/-1.5
- Rate of climb: 5.0 m/s (980 ft/min) at sea level
- Take-off run: 150 m (492 ft)
