= General Dynamics Model 100 =

1960s US ground attack aircraft proposal

General Dynamics Model 100 A-8

General information
- Type: Counter-insurgency
- National origin: United States
- Manufacturer: General Dynamics
- Primary user: United States Air Force (intended)
- Number built: None

The General Dynamics Model 100 was a 1960s proposal for a counter-insurgency (COIN) ground attack aircraft intended for use by the United States Air Force (USAF).

== Development ==
The Model 100 was conceived by General Dynamics in 1966 as a response to a USAF requirement for a COIN aircraft to replace the Douglas A-1 Skyraider. The initial design featured a turboprop-powered aircraft with straight wings and a T-tail, but a later design had a conventional tail design. Although the Model 100 was referred to as A-8A, it is unclear if the USAF ever officially assigned the designation to the Model 100.

The Model 100 was eventually shelved in favor of the A-X program that would result in the development of the Fairchild Republic A-10 Thunderbolt II.
