= Gaunt biplane no.2 =

Biplane no.2 'Baby'

General information
- Type: Experimental single seat biplane
- National origin: United Kingdom
- Designer: John Gaunt [1876-1956]
- Primary user: designer
- Number built: 1

History
- First flight: 12 June 1911
- Retired: August 1912

The Gaunt biplane no.2 'Baby' was a single-engine, single-seat biplane, designed by John Gaunt and flown by him with some success from Southport sands in Lancashire, England during the summer of 1911.

== Design and development ==
John Gaunt's first biplane (1910) and his monoplane (1911) both crashed during attempts to get airborne, but biplane no.2 'Baby' was much more successful. It had a lower wingspan which was somewhat less than that of the upper wingspan. The wings and interplane struts formed a single bay structure with additional pairs of interplane struts close to the fuselage in place of cabane struts, and an outward-leaning single strut on each side from the lower wingtip to the overhanging upper plane. The wings were unusual for the time, being covered not with fabric but thin plywood sheets. These were sewn together through eyelets inserted into them. Lateral control was provided by wing warping.

The fuselage was rectangular in cross-section and tapered towards the tail. A deep chord tailplane with highly swept leading edges and a pair of elevators with rounded trailing edges was mounted on top. At least part of the rudder projected below the fuselage. It was protected from the ground by a long tailskid, mounted well below the fuselage on a long post which also extended above the fuselage and appears, in a photograph, to have carried a small flag. The pilot's open cockpit was positioned close to the trailing edge of the wing, which had a large cutout to improve visibility. The main undercarriage was built around a central skid, mounted on a pair of transverse V-struts to the fuselage. The two landing wheels were mounted on a split axle, attached to the skid.

The Baby was powered by a 30 hp (22 kW) Alvaston twin-cylinder, horizontally opposed, water-cooled engine in the nose. It drove a two-blade propeller and was cooled by a pair of rectangular radiators, mounted longitudinally on the top edges of the fuselage, between the engine and the pilot, with their top edges attached to the lower surface of the upper wing.

== Operational history ==
John Gaunt flew his aircraft successfully for the first time on 12 June 1911 from his base on Southport sands. On 23 June, he covered a total of about seven miles, still flying mostly in straight lines. In the first week of July, he increased the distance covered, despite a member of the crowd he had attracted, who, unnoticed, bent one elevator out of shape and almost caused a crash. By 24 July, he had achieved flights of 30 minutes and reached an altitude of 300 ft (100 m). On 4 August, he made his first cautious turn but turns on windy days remained a problem into early September. That month, the Baby was flown successfully by another pilot, W.S Leveson-Gower, who posed no problems for the aircraft despite weighing 70 lb (32 kg) more than Gaunt.

It seems the aircraft flew again in the summer of 1912, but that a crash on 22 August ended its career.

== Specifications ==
Data from British Aircraft before the Great War

General characteristics

- Crew: one
- Wing area: 208 sq ft (19.3 m^{2})
- Empty weight: 600 lb (272 kg)
- Powerplant: 1 × Alvaston 2-cylinder horizontally opposed, water-cooled
- Propellers: 2-bladed Gaunt, 7 ft 0 in (2.13 m) diameter

Performance

- Maximum speed: 50 mph (80 km/h, 43 kn)
- Stall speed: 35 mph (56 km/h, 30 kn)
