= Gardan GY-120 =

GY-120

General information
- Type: Two seat ultralight
- National origin: France
- Manufacturer: Société des Avions Yves Gardan
- Designer: Yves Gardan
- Number built: 1

History
- First flight: 27 April 1984

The Gardan GY-120 was a single engine, parasol wing ultralight seating two in tandem, designed and built in France in the 1980s. It did not go into production.

== Design and development ==
Design work on the GY-120, Yves Gardan's first ultralight, began in June 1982. The prototype was built that October and appeared, unflown, at the Paris Air Show of 1983. It flew for the first time on 27 April 1984.

The GY-120 had an aluminium alloy tube structure, stressed to FAR 23 standard. Its parasol wing was unswept and of constant chord, carrying half span ailerons. The wing was supported from below by a fore and aft pair of inverted V-form struts from the upper fuselage longerons to its centreline. These struts also supported a longitudinal inverted V kingpost to which landing wires were attached. Flying wires braced the wing from below to the lower fuselage. The fuselage was flat sided, the fin and rudder straight edged. The leading edge of the fin was swept and the deep, almost rectangular rudder reached down between the elevators, mounted on the tailplane at the top of the fuselage, to the keel. Two seats in tandem were placed below the wing in a continuous open cockpit. The GY-120 had a fixed conventional undercarriage, with the mainwheels on half axles and radius arms mounted on the fuselage centreline and near vertical rubber compression legs fixed to the fuselage sides. The mainwheels had brakes and the tailwheel was coil sprung.

The only GY-120 built was powered by a 30 kW (40 hp) Hirth 270 two-cylinder inline, two-stroke engine, though it was designed to accept a variety of engines in the 26-45 kW (35-60 hp) range.

== Specifications ==
Data from Ultralight and Microlight Aircraft of the World

General characteristics

- Capacity: two
- Length: 5.80 m (19 ft 0 in)
- Wingspan: 10.00 m (32 ft 10 in)
- Height: 2.50 m (8 ft 2 in)
- Wing area: 17.5 m^{2} (188 sq ft)
- Aspect ratio: 5.7
- Empty weight: 145 kg (320 lb)
- Max takeoff weight: 340 kg (750 lb)
- Fuel capacity: 30 L (7.9 US gal; 6.6 Imp gal)
- Powerplant: 1 × Hirth 270R-03E air cooled, twin cylinder inline two stroke, 30 kW (40 hp) at 7,000 rpm, toothed belt 2.7:1 output speed reduction
- Propellers: 2-bladed, 1.40 m (4 ft 7 in) diameter

Performance

- Maximum speed: 120 km/h (75 mph, 65 kn)
- Cruise speed: 75 km/h (47 mph, 40 kn) economic
- Stall speed: 38 km/h (24 mph, 21 kn)
- Range: 400 km (250 mi, 220 nmi) at average cruising speed
- Service ceiling: 2,500 m (8,200 ft) service
- g limits: +6.6/-3.3 ultimate
- Maximum glide ratio: power off 10:1 at 65 km/h (40 mph)
- Rate of climb: 2.5 m/s (490 ft/min) maximum at sea level
- Rate of sink: 1.8 m/s (350 ft/min) minimum at 65 km/h
- Wing loading: 19.4 kg/m^{2} (4.0 lb/sq ft) maximum
- Power/mass: 11.4 kW/kg (18.8 hp/lb) maximum at MTOW
- Take-off distance: 40 m (130 ft)
- Landing distance: 35 m (115 ft)
