= G-Aerosports Archon =

Greek aircraft

Archon
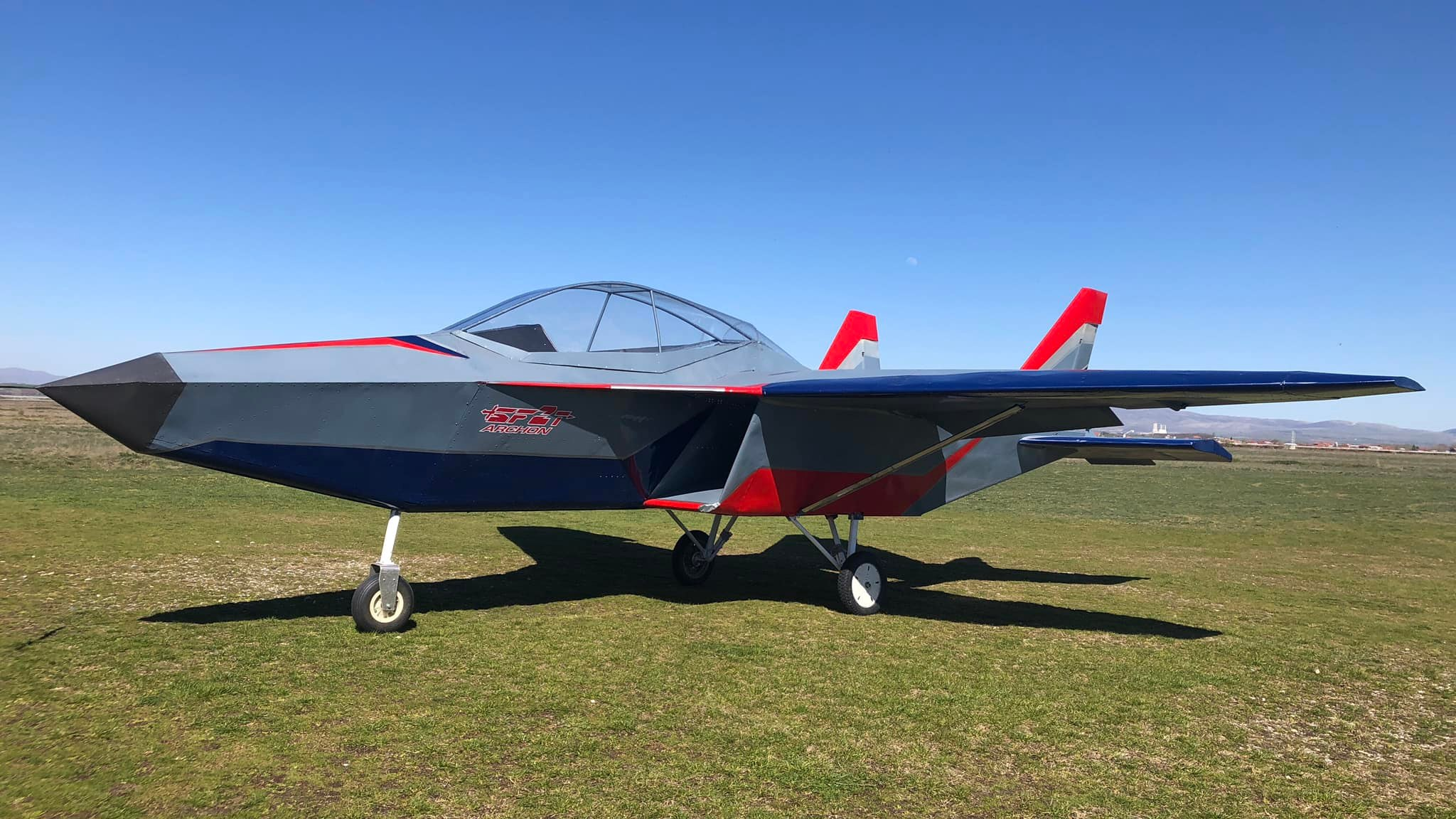
- G-Aerosports SF-2T Archon

General information
- Type: Ultralight aircraft
- National origin: Greek
- Manufacturer: G-Aerosports
- Status: Active

History
- First flight: June 11, 2009
- Developed into: SF-2T Archon

G-Aerosports Archon (Greek: Άρχων) is one of the light aircraft types designed and built by G-Aerosports, an airplane manufacturer based in the city of Florina in Northern Greece. The plane has the configuration of a fifth-generation jet fighter and its first version, the single-seat SF/1, made its first flight on June 11, 2009.

In 2020, an agreement was signed with Fisher Flying Products regarding its license production in Canada for the North American market. The two-seat version SF-2T made its first official flight on April 4, 2022, and in 2023 it was included in a license agreement for production by Fisher Flying Products; an agreement for license production in Australia was also signed.

The plane is offered for sale in a kit form, while a small number of ready-to-fly copies has been produced to date.

== Specifications (SF-1) ==
Data from Ckd.Aero

General characteristics

- Crew: one
- Length: 26 ft (7.9 m)
- Wingspan: 25 ft (7.6 m)
- Height: 7 ft (2.1 m)
- Wing area: 133.04 sq ft (12.360 m^{2})
- Empty weight: 600 lb (272 kg)
- Gross weight: 1,050 lb (476 kg) max
- Fuel capacity: 22
- Powerplant: 1 × Zongshen C115 , 141 hp (105 kW)
- Propellers: 2-bladed

Performance

- Maximum speed: 112 mph (180 km/h, 97 kn)
- Cruise speed: 110 mph (180 km/h, 96 kn)
- Stall speed: 40 mph (64 km/h, 35 kn)
- Never exceed speed: 155 mph (249 km/h, 135 kn)
- Range: 500 mi (800 km, 430 nmi)
- g limits: +6, -3
- Rate of climb: 1,000 ft/min (5.1 m/s)
- Wing loading: 7.89 lb/sq ft (38.5 kg/m^{2})
