= Gazuit-Valladeau GV-1020 =

GV-103 Gazelle
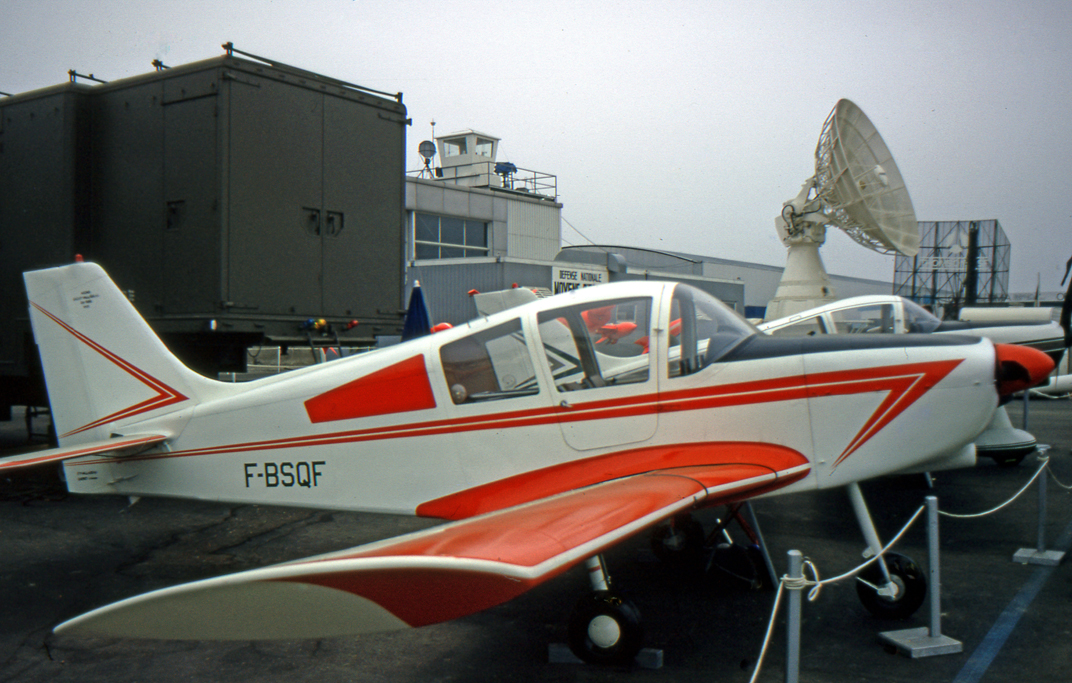
- The first GV-1020, exhibited at the 1971 Paris Air Show

General information
- Type: light touring aircraft
- National origin: France
- Manufacturer: Gazuit-Valladeau
- Designer: Georges Gazuit
- Number built: at least 7

History
- First flight: 1 May 1969

The Gazuit-Valladeau GV-103 Gazelle was a French-built light two- to four-seat training, aerobatic and touring aircraft of the late 1960s.

== Design and development ==
The first GV-103L, as it was originally called, was a two- or three-seat light touring aircraft first flown in 1969. Later referred to as the GV-103 and powered by an 86 kW (115 hp) Lycoming O-235 flat-four engine, it led to several production variants with two, three and four seats using engines of increasing power within the same airframe. It had a side-by-side seating layout and a fixed tricycle undercarriage with a longer nosewheel which gave the aircraft a pronounced tail-down attitude on the ground. Its construction was primarily metal but included some glass fibre structures and plastic bonding, novel at the time.

First flown on 1 May 1969, the GV-103 first appeared in public at the Paris Air Show in June 1969. The first two-seat production prototype GV-1020 Gazelle was on display at the Paris 1971 Show. It was intended to meet a club market for basic and aerobatic training.

The second Gazelle to fly was the prototype of the four-seat GV-1031 tourer, powered by a 112 kW (150 hp) Lycoming O-320 flat-four engine. An intermediate, three-seat variant with a Rolls-Royce built 97 kW (130 hp) Continental O-240 engine was planned but may not have been built. A four-five seat variant with a 134 kW (180 hhp) engine and retractable undercarriage was also planned, and feasibility studies of a twin-engine version made, but neither reached the construction stage.

== Operational history ==
By November 1972 seven Gazelle prototypes were flying and the GV-1301 received its French certification in April that year, with the CV-1020 expected to follow in January 1973. The GV-1020 had only a short operational career and was no longer on the French civil aircraft register by January 1983, though two GV-1031s, one dismantled, remained registered in mid-2010. In 1970 plans for the Canadian company Mondair Aviation to build the Gazelle range under licence as the Mondair 115/130/150 were announced. One GV-1031, without engine, reached Canada, but no North American production followed.

== Variants ==
GV-103L

Later GV-103. First prototype, two-three seat, 85.7 kW (115 hp) Lycoming O-235 powered.

GV-1031

Second prototype and production four-seat tourer, 112 kW (150 hp) Lycoming O-320 powered. At least two built, one going to Canada.

GV-1020

Production two-seat aerobatic and basic trainer, 85.7 kW (115 hp) Lycoming O-235 powered.

GV-1032

Three seat, Rolls-Royce built 97 kW (130 hp) Continental O-240. May not have been completed.

== Specifications ==
Data from Flight 30 November 1972

General characteristics

- Crew: one
- Capacity: one passenger
- Length: 6.60 m (21 ft 8 in)
- Wingspan: 8.75 m (28 ft 8 in)
- Height: 2.50 m (8 ft 2 in)
- Wing area: 12.10 m^{2} (130.2 sq ft)
- Aspect ratio: 6.3
- Airfoil: NACA 23015
- Empty weight: 525 kg (1,157 lb)
- Gross weight: 750 kg (1,653 lb)
- Fuel capacity: 90L (23.8 US gal; 19.5 Imp gal)
- Powerplant: 1 × Lycoming O-235 4-cylinder horizontally opposed air cooled piston, 86 kW (115 hp)

Performance

- Maximum speed: 215 km/h (134 mph, 116 kn)
- Cruise speed: 190 km/h (120 mph, 100 kn) at 75% power
- Stall speed: 75 km/h (47 mph, 40 kn) full flaps
- Range: 750 km (470 mi, 400 nmi)
- Service ceiling: 3,500 m (11,500 ft)
- Rate of climb: 3 m/s (590 ft/min)
