= SITAR GY-100 Bagheera =

GY-100 Bagheera
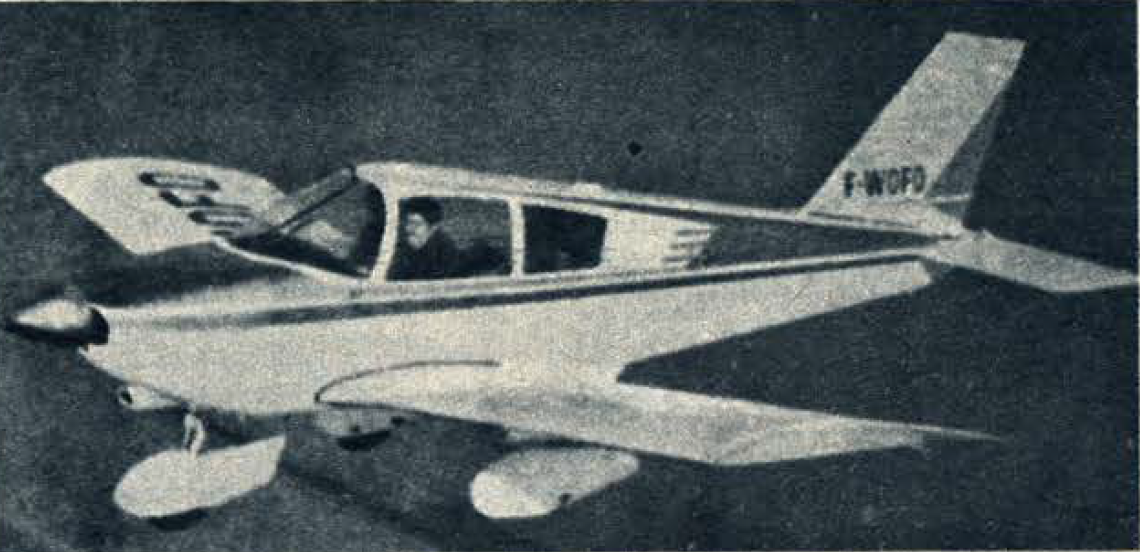

General information
- Type: Civil utility aircraft
- National origin: France
- Manufacturer: SITAR
- Designer: Yves Gardan
- Number built: 2

History
- First flight: 20 or 21 December 1967

The SITAR GY-100 Bagheera (named after Bagheera, a character in Rudyard Kipling's The Jungle Book) was a light aircraft designed and built in France in the late 1960s. Designed by Yves Gardan, it was a low-wing, cantilever monoplane of conventional layout with fixed, tricycle undercarriage. The fully enclosed cabin had seating for up to four people in 2+2 configuration. Construction was of metal throughout.

Type certification was granted in 1971, and Gardan hoped to market the Bagheera through his company, SITAR. However, with the oil crisis looming and after the prototype disintegrated in flight, Gardan abandoned development. Only two examples were built.

== Specifications ==
Data from Jane's All the World's Aircraft 1971–72

General characteristics

- Crew: 1
- Capacity: 3 passengers
- Length: 6.10 m (20 ft 0 in)
- Wingspan: 8.20 m (26 ft 11 in)
- Height: 2.00 m (6 ft 7 in)
- Wing area: 12.20 m^{2} (131.3 sq ft)
- Empty weight: 500 kg (1,102 lb)
- Max takeoff weight: 918 kg (2,024 lb)
- Fuel capacity: 150 L (33 imp gal; 40 US gal)
- Powerplant: 1 × Lycoming O-320 air-cooled flat-four, 101 kW (135 hp) (derated from 110 kW (150 hp)
- Propellers: 2-bladed metal fixed-pitch, 1.88 m (6 ft 2 in) diameter

Performance

- Maximum speed: 235 km/h (146 mph, 127 kn) at sea level
- Cruise speed: 225 km/h (140 mph, 121 kn) at 1,500 m (4,900 ft)
- Stall speed: 85 km/h (53 mph, 46 kn)
- Range: 980 km (610 mi, 530 nmi)
- Service ceiling: 3,800 m (12,500 ft)
- Rate of climb: 4 m/s (790 ft/min)
- Takeoff run: 150 m (490 ft)
- Landing run: 90 m (300 ft)
