= Gatard Statoplan Poussin =

AG 02 Poussin

General information
- Type: Sports plane
- Manufacturer: Homebuilt
- Designer: Albert Gatard

History
- First flight: 1957

The Gatard Statoplan AG 02 Poussin (French: "Chick") was a light, single-seat sports airplane developed in France in the late 1950s and marketed for homebuilding. In layout, it was a low-wing cantilever monoplane of short-coupled design with fixed tailwheel undercarriage. Construction was a plywood-covered wooden structure throughout, and the cockpit was enclosed by a large perspex bubble canopy. The variable-incidence horizontal stabiliser was fitted with small endplates to provide extra directional stability but there were no separate elevators.

An unusual feature of the design was the aircraft's method of climbing. In most aircraft designs, climb is achieved (without change in engine power) by pitching the aircraft so that the angle of attack of the wings increases, thereby increasing lift. The Poussin, however, was designed to climb by lowering specially designed flaps and trimming the tailplane to balance out any change in pitch, therefore allowing the aircraft to achieve its maximum rate of climb while keeping the fuselage within 4° of level. The extra drag created by the lowered flaps was balanced by drag saved by keeping the fuselage level.

== Specifications (Second prototype) ==
Data from Jane's All The World's Aircraft 1976–77

General characteristics

- Crew: one
- Length: 4.53 m (14 ft 10 in)
- Wingspan: 6.40 m (21 ft 0 in)
- Height: 1.50 m (4 ft 11 in)
- Wing area: 6.15 m^{2} (66.2 sq ft)
- Airfoil: NACA 23012
- Empty weight: 170 kg (375 lb)
- Max takeoff weight: 280 kg (617 lb)
- Fuel capacity: 30 L (7.9 US gal; 6.6 imp gal)
- Powerplant: 1 × modified Volkswagen air-cooled flat-four, 18 kW (24 hp)
- Propellers: 2-bladed Gatard fixed-pitch wooden propeller

Performance

- Cruise speed: 144 km/h (89 mph, 78 kn)
- Stall speed: 65 km/h (40 mph, 35 kn)
- Never exceed speed: 216 km/h (134 mph, 117 kn)
- Range: 375 km (233 mi, 202 nmi)
- Rate of climb: 2.21 m/s (435 ft/min)
- Take-off distance to 15 m (49 ft): 435 m (1,427 ft)
- Landing distance from 15 m (49 ft): 320 m (1,050 ft)
