= Gabriel P 5 =

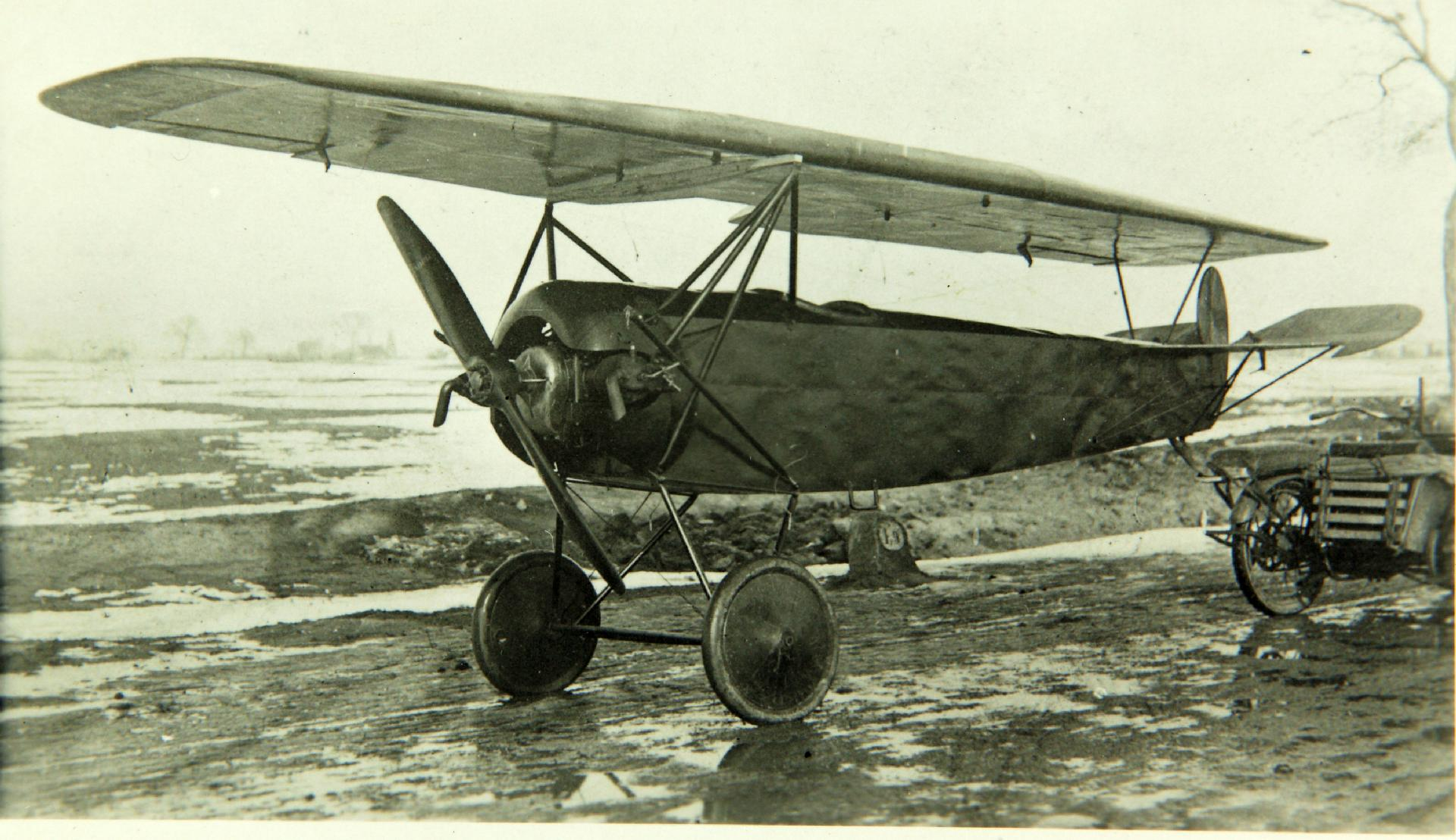
- Gabriel P 5a with its wing in road-towing position

General information
- Type: Light aircraft
- National origin: Poland
- Manufacturer: Pawel and Jan Gabriel
- Designer: Pawel Gabriel
- Number built: 1

History
- First flight: Early September 1921

The Gabriel P 5 was the first nationally developed aircraft to fly in Poland after it became independent in 1918. It was an amateur-built, low-powered, single seat parasol wing machine. Only one was completed.

== Design and development ==
Brothers Pawel and Jan Gabriel became interested in aviation in their youth and by 1913 had built and tried to fly four gliders. During the later part of World War I they worked in the Rumpler factory, initially in the repair department. Later Pawel later joined the design team and Jan learned to fly. At the end of the war they returned to Poland and in 1920 began the design of their first powered aircraft, the P 5, which consciously followed the layout of the Fokker D.VIII. Their father owned a furniture factory in Bydgoszcz and provided them with space and tools.

The P 5 had an approximately rectangular plan wing apart from blunted tips and was built in one piece around twin spars with plywood covering. The ailerons were fabric covered. Originally there was a flap in the central trailing edge to ease access to the cockpit. The wing was braced to the fuselage on each side with a parallel pair of steel tube struts from the lower longeron to each spar. From the top of the forward member of the pair one shorter strut reached back to the upper longeron below the trailing edge and another went forward to the engine mounting at mid-fuselage height.

The P 5 was powered by a 22 kW (30 hp) air-cooled flat twin Haacke HFM-2 driving a propeller designed by the brothers and mounted within a metal cowling with its cylinder heads exposed for cooling. Behind the engine and its fuel tank the fuselage structure was rectangular in section and was ply covered, flat-sided apart from rounded decking. The open, single cockpit was under the access flap in the trailing edge. The P 5's tailplane, with balanced elevators, was mounted on top of the fuselage and braced from below with a V-strut on each side. The fin was small and semi-circular in profile with a larger balanced rudder which reached down to the keel. The rudder and elevators were originally fabric covered.

Its fixed landing gear had large mainwheels on a single axle, supported via rubber cord shock absorbers by steel V-struts at either end. There was a tall, sprung tailskid at the rear.

The P 5 was completed in June 1921 and moved to the local flying school's airfield where Jan Gabriel took it on its first flight early in September. This was the first flight of an aircraft nationally designed and built in independent Poland. Further flying proved acceptable handling and decent performance. The winter break was used to make some modifications. The rear control surfaces were re-covered with plywood instead of the original fabric to prevent flutter. Access to the cockpit was improved by replacing the trailing edge flap with a semi-circular cut-out which reduced the wing area by 0.3 m^{2} (3.2 sq ft). Alterations were also made to make it easier to transport the P 5 by road with its wing demounted and re-attached above the fuselage. This required a new, detachable transverse steel tube between the forward spar struts and a pair of outward-leaning struts to support the wingtip ahead of the fin. In flight these components were stored in a new luggage locker behind the pilot. After the modifications the aircraft was referred to as the P 5a.

The P 5a was flown regularly in 1922 and 1923 at Bydgoszcz, both by the Gabriels and by military pilots from the flying school there, logging up about 180 hours. The brothers tried to interest the Department of Aerial Navigation in its serial production but had no success. By 1923 the sole P 5 was in need of an overhaul but was instead scrapped.

== Specifications (P 5a) ==
Data from Cynk (1971) except where noted

General characteristics

- Crew: One
- Length: 4 m (13 ft 1 in)
- Wingspan: 5 m (16 ft 5 in)
- Height: 2.1 m (6 ft 11 in)
- Wing area: 5.7 m^{2} (61 sq ft)
- Empty weight: 135 kg (298 lb) with 1 hr fuel
- Gross weight: 215 kg (474 lb)
- Powerplant: 1 × Haacke HFM-2 air-cooled flat twin engine, 22 kW (30 hp)
- Propellers: 2-bladed Gabriel, 1.90 m (6 ft 3 in) diameter wooden

Performance

- Maximum speed: 150 km/h (93 mph, 81 kn) at sea level
- Cruise speed: 125 km/h (78 mph, 67 kn)
- Stall speed: 75 km/h (47 mph, 40 kn) minimum speed
- Endurance: 2.5 hr
- Service ceiling: 2,800 m (9,200 ft)
- Time to altitude: 7 min to 1,000 m (3,300 ft)
