= List of aircraft (Si) =

This is a list of aircraft in alphabetical order beginning with 'Si'.

== Si ==
=== SIA ===
(Società Incremento Aviazione, Cameri)

- Gabardini 1911 Le Monaco monoplane
- Gabardini 1912 flying boat
- Gabardini 1913 monoplane
- Gabardini 1914 biplane

=== SIA ===
(Societá Industriale l'Aviazone)

- Bastianelli P.R.B.

=== SIA-Delaunay-Belleville ===
(Société Industrielle d'Aviation - Etablissements Delaunay-Belleville)

- S.I.A.-Coanda BN2
- S.I.A.-Coanda Lorraine bomber

=== SIA ===
(Società Italiana Aviazione / Società Italiana degli Aeroplani)

- SIA FB
- SIA 7
- SIA R2
- SIA 9B

=== SIA ===
(Società Italiana degli Aeroplani / Enrico Luzzatto)

- SIA 1913 racing monoplane Roma
- SIA 1913 Circuito dei Laghi floatplane (Roma on floats)

=== SIAI ===
(Società Italiana Aeroplani Idrovolanti / Societa Idrovolanti Alta Italia - S.I.A.I)

- SIAI S.8
- SIAI S.9
- SIAI S.12
- SIAI S.13
- SIAI S.16
- SIAI S.17
- SIAI S.19
- SIAI S.21
- SIAI S.22
- SIAI S.23
- SIAI S.50 (MVT)
- SIAI S.50 Hydro
- SIAI S.51
- SIAI S.52
- SIAI S.58
- SIAI S.67

=== SIAI Marchetti ===
(Italy)

- SIAI-Marchetti SM.91
- SIAI-Marchetti SM.92
- SIAI-Marchetti SM.95
- SIAI-Marchetti SM.101
- SIAI-Marchetti SM.102
- SIAI Marchetti S.205
- SIAI Marchetti S.208
- SIAI Marchetti S.210
- SIAI Marchetti S.211
- SIAI Marchetti SF.250
- SIAI-Marchetti SF.260
- SIAI Marchetti Canguro
- SIAI-Marchetti SM.1019
- SIAI-Marchetti FN.333 Riviera
- SIAI-Marchetti SH-4
- SIAI-Marchetti SV-20

=== SIAT ===
(Siebel Flugzeugwerke ATG)

- SIAT 222 Super Hummel
- SIAT 223 Flamingo

=== SibNIA ===
- SibNIA TVS-2MS

=== Siddeley-Deasy ===
(Siddeley-Deasy Motor Company, United Kingdom)

- Siddeley-Deasy R.T.1
- Siddeley-Deasy SR.2 Siskin
- Siddeley-Deasy Sinaia

=== Sido ===
(Józef Sido)

- Sido S.1

=== Siebel ===
- Siebel Fh 104 Hallore
- Siebel Si 201
- Siebel Si 202 Hummel
- Siebel Si 204

=== Siegrist ===
(Rudolf Siegrist, Parma, Ohio, United States)

- Siegrist RS1 Ilse

=== Siemens and FlyEco ===
- Siemens-FlyEco Magnus eFusion

=== Siemens-Schuckert ===
(Siemens-Schuckertwerke)

- Siemens-Schuckert 1911 monoplane
- Siemens-Schuckert B.I
- Siemens-Forssmann Bulldog
- Siemens-Schuckert D.I
- Siemens-Schuckert D.II
- Siemens-Schuckert D.III
- Siemens-Schuckert D.IV
- Siemens-Schuckert D.V
- Siemens-Schuckert D.VI
- Siemens-Schuckert Dr.I
- Siemens-Schuckert DDr.I
- Siemens-Schuckert DD 5
- Siemens-Schuckert E.I
- Siemens-Schuckert E.II
- Siemens-Schuckert E.III
- Siemens-Schuckert L.I
- Siemens-Schuckert Forssman
- Siemens-Schuckert Steffen R.I
- Siemens-Schuckert Steffen R.II
- Siemens-Schuckert Steffen R.III
- Siemens-Schuckert Steffen R.IV
- Siemens-Schuckert Steffen R.V
- Siemens-Schuckert Steffen R.VI
- Siemens-Schuckert Steffen R.VII
- Siemens-Schuckert R.VIII
- Siemens-Schuckert R.IX (project only)
- Siemens-Schuckert Torpedogleiter

=== Siemetzki ===
- Siemetzki ASRO 3-T
- Siemetzki ASRO 4

=== Sierra ===
(Aircraft Industries Ltd (founders: John L Berney, J F Long, Art Wild), 931 E 14 St, San Leandro, California, United States)

- Sierra BLW-1
- Sierra BLW-2

=== Sierra ===
(Sierra Aircraft Co (pres: Leon T Eliel), Sierra Airdrome, Foothill Blvd, Sierra Madre, California, United States)

- Sierra Standard

=== Siersma ===
(Herman Siersma, Detroit, Michigan, United States)

- Siersma SRC-1

=== Sievers-Miller ===
((?) Sievers and Phillip Miller, Valley City, North Carolina, United States)

- Sievers-Miller Special

=== Sikorsky ===
(Igor Ivanovich Sikorsky, Russia)

- Sikorsky H-1 Sikorsky's first helicopter design
- Sikorsky H-2 Sikorsky's second helicopter design
- Sikorsky S-1 single-engine pusher biplane
- Sikorsky S-2 single-engine tractor biplane developed from the S-1
- Sikorsky S-3 enlarged and improved version of S-2
- Sikorsky S-4 single-seat, single-engine biplane prototype; never flown
- Sikorsky S-5 single-seat, single-engine biplane
- Sikorsky S-6 three-seat, single-engine biplane
- Sikorsky S-7 two-seat, single-engine monoplane
- Sikorsky S-8 Malyutka, two-seat biplane trainer
- Sikorsky S-9 Krugly, three-seat, single-engine monoplane
- Sikorsky S-10 reconnaissance/trainer seaplane developed from the S-6
- Sikorsky S-11 Polokrugly, prototype two-seat, single engine reconnaissance monoplane based on the S-9
- Sikorsky S-12 single-seat, single-engine monoplane trainer developed from the S-11
- Sikorsky S-13 single-seat, biplane fighter design; never finished due to unavailability of engines
- Sikorsky S-14 single-seat, biplane fighter design; never finished due to unavailability of engines
- Sikorsky S-15 single-engine, light bomber floatplane
- Sikorsky S-16 (S-XVI) two-seat, single-engine escort fighter
- Sikorsky S-17 (S-XVII) two-seat, single-engine reconnaissance biplane based on the S-10
- Sikorsky S-18 (S-XVIII) two-seat, twin-engine pusher biplane fighter/interceptor
- Sikorsky S-19 (S-XIX) prototype twin-engine, twin-boom biplane
- Sikorsky S-20 (S-XX) two-seat biplane fighter
- Sikorsky S-21 Russky Vityaz, four-engine biplane airliner
- Sikorsky S-22 Ilya Muromets, unarmed trainer
- Sikorsky S-23 Ilya Muromets
- Sikorsky S-24 Ilya Muromets
- Sikorsky S-25 Ilya Muromets
- Sikorsky S-26 Ilya Muromets
- Sikorsky S-27 Ilya Muromets
- Sikorsky Alexander Nevsky 1916 replacement for the IM
- Sikorsky Avion Atlas proposed four-engine biplane bomber for France; cancelled due to the end of WWI
- Sikorsky IS-27 Battleplane proposed four-engine biplane heavy bomber developed from the Avion Atlas; for the USAAS
- Sikorsky Ilya Muromets (a.k.a. Grand or Bolshoi Baltiiski)
- Sikorsky Russky Vityaz

=== Sikorsky Aircraft Corporation ===
(United States)

- Sikorsky C-6
- Sikorsky C-28
- Sikorsky H-3
- Sikorsky H-5
- Sikorsky H-7
- Sikorsky H-18
- Sikorsky H-19
- Sikorsky H-34
- Sikorsky H-37
- Sikorsky H-38-SI
- Sikorsky H-39
- Sikorsky H-52
- Sikorsky H-53 all variants of the H-53
- Sikorsky H-54
- Sikorsky H-59
- Sikorsky H-60 all variants of the military S-70
- Sikorsky HJS
- Sikorsky HNS
- Sikorsky HO2S
- Sikorsky HO3S
- Sikorsky HO4S
- Sikorsky HO5S
- Sikorsky HRS
- Sikorsky HR2S
- Sikorsky HR2S-1W
- Sikorsky HR3S
- Sikorsky HR3S
- Sikorsky HSS
- Sikorsky HUS
- Sikorsky HU2S
- Sikorsky JRS
- Sikorsky JR2S
- Sikorsky OA-8
- Sikorsky OA-10
- Sikorsky OA-11
- Sikorsky PS-1
- Sikorsky PS-2
- Sikorsky P2S
- Sikorsky PBS
- Sikorsky RS
- Sikorsky R-4
- Sikorsky R-5
- Sikorsky R-6 Hoverfly II
- Sikorsky V-2
- Sikorsky XBLR-3
- Sikorsky Cypher
- Sikorsky Cypher II
- Sikorsky S-28 proposed four-engine biplane airliner; Sikorsky's first American design
- Sikorsky S-29-A twin-engine biplane airliner
- Sikorsky S-30 proposed twin-engine biplane airliner
- Sikorsky S-31 single-engine civil utility sesquiplane
- Sikorsky S-32 single-engine floatplane
- Sikorsky S-33 Messenger two-seat utility/race aircraft
- Sikorsky S-34 six-seat, twin-engine amphibious sesquiplane
- Sikorsky S-35 trimotor transatlantic sesquiplane
- Sikorsky S-36 eight-seat, twin-engine amphibious sesquiplane developed from the S-34
- Sikorsky S-37 twin-engine long-range aircraft developed from the S-35
- Sikorsky S-38 twin-engine, ten-seat sesquiplane flying boat developed from the S-34 and S-36
- Sikorsky S-39 smaller, single-engine version of S-38
- Sikorsky S-40 four-engine passenger monoplane flying boat developed from the S-38
- Sikorsky S-41 scaled-up monoplane version of S-38
- Sikorsky S-42 Clipper, large four-engine passenger flying boat developed from the S-40
- Sikorsky S-43 scaled down, twin-engine version of S-42
- Sikorsky S-44 large four-engine transatlantic flying boat based on the XPBS-1
- Sikorsky S-45 proposed large double-deck, six-engine transoceanic passenger flying boat
- Sikorsky S-46
- Sikorsky S-47
- Sikorsky S-48
- Sikorsky S-49
- Sikorsky S-50
- Sikorsky S-51
- Sikorsky S-52
- Sikorsky S-53
- Sikorsky S-54
- Sikorsky S-55
- Sikorsky S-57
- Sikorsky S-58
- Sikorsky S-59
- Sikorsky S-60
- Sikorsky S-61
- Sikorsky S-62
- Sikorsky S-63
- Sikorsky S-64
- Sikorsky S-65
- Sikorsky S-67
- Sikorsky S-68
- Sikorsky S-69
- Sikorsky S-70
- Sikorsky S-71
- Sikorsky S-72
- Sikorsky S-75
- Sikorsky S-76
- Sikorsky S-80
- Sikorsky S-92 Helibus
- Sikorsky S-333
- Sikorsky S-434
- Sikorsky SH-3H AEW
- Sikorsky H-92 Superhawk
- Sikorsky RVR Reverse Velocity Rotor
- Sikorsky SS
- Sikorsky Standard
- Sikorsky UH-60 Black Hawk
- Sikorsky UN-4
- Sikorsky Cypher
- Sikorsky CH-148 Cyclone Canadian Armed Forces
- Sikorsky-Boeing SB-1 Defiant
- Sikorsky VH-92

=== Silbervogel ===
- Silbervogel Project Plane

=== Silence aircraft ===
- Silence Twister

=== Silent Family ===
(Silent Family Helmet Grossklaus, Westerrade, Germany)

- Silent Family Silent Glider e-M
- Silent Family Silent Glider M
- Silent Family Silent Glider ME
- Silent Family Silent Racer

=== Silesia (First Silesian aircraft factory) ===
- Silesia S-3
- Silesia S-4
- Silesia S-10

=== Silhouette ===
(Task Research Inc. / Silhouette Aircraft Inc., Santa Paula, California, United States)

- Silhouette Aircraft SA-60 Silhouette

=== Silvanskii ===
(A. V. Silvanskii)

- Silvanskii IS
- Silvanskii I-220

=== Silver Wing ===
(Silver Wing Aircraft Co (founders: Edward Euler, A H Hogue), 28th & Spruce Sts, Boulder, Colorado, United States)

- Silver Wing 1928 Monoplane

=== Silvercraft ===
(Silvercraft SpA, Italy)

- Silvercraft SH-4
- Silvercraft SH-200

=== Silverston ===
()

- Silverston Milwaukee#2

=== Simmering-Graz-Pauker ===
(Simmering-Graz-Pauker A.G.)

- SGP M-222 Flamingo

=== Simmonds Aircraft ===
(United Kingdom)

- Simmonds Spartan

=== Simmons ===
(Herbert H Simmons, 2111 Franklin St, San Diego, California, United States)

- Simmons Sp-1 Sport Monoplane

=== Simonet ===
- Simonet SHBF Aviette

=== Simplex ===
(Société des Avions Simplex) see:Arnoux

=== Simplex ===
(Simplex Aircraft Co (founders: E J & F W Allen), Defiance, Ohio, United States)

- Simplex K-2-C Red Arrow
- Simplex K-3-C Red Arrow
- Simplex K-2-S Red Arrow
- Simplex W-2-S Red Arrow
- Simplex R-2-D Red Arrow Dual Plane a.k.a. Simplex Racer
- Simplex S-2 Kite
- Simplex Special
- Simplex W-5-C

=== Simpson ===
(F Simpson, Wheeling, West Virginia, United States)

- Simpson Maverick
- Simpson Special

=== Simůnek / Kamarýt ===
(Jan Simůnek MSc / Jaroslav Kamarýt)

- Simůnek / Kamarýt SK-1 Trempík (Trempík – Little Tramp)
- Simůnek VBS-1

=== Sindlinger ===
(Fred G Sindlinger, Puyallup, Washington, United States)

- Sindlinger HH-1
- Sindlinger Special#1

=== Sink ===
(Everett Sink, Zanesville, Ohio, United States)

- Sink S-1

=== Sino Swearingen Aircraft Corporation ===
- Sino Swearingen SJ-30

=== Sioux ===
(Sioux Aircraft Co, Sioux City, Iowa, United States)

- Sioux Coupe 60
- Sioux Coupe 90
- Sioux Coupe 90-A
- Sioux Coupe 90-B Junior
- Sioux Coupe 90-C Senior

=== SIPA ===
(Société Industrielle Pour l'Aéronautique, France)

- SIPA S.10
- SIPA S.11
- SIPA S.111
- SIPA S.12
- SIPA S.121
- SIPA S.20
- SIPA S.30
- SIPA S.50
- SIPA S.70
- SIPA S.90
- SIPA S.901
- SIPA S.902
- SIPA S.903
- SIPA S.904
- SIPA S.91
- SIPA S.92
- SIPA S.93
- SIPA S.94
- SIPA S.200 Minijet
- SIPA S.251 Antilope
- SIPA S.261 Anjou
- SIPA S.262
- SIPA S.300
- SIPA S.1000 Coccinelle
- SIPA S.1100

=== Sipowicz ===
- Sipowicz I

=== Sisler ===
((A M Bert) Sisler Aircraft Co, Bloomington, Minnesota, United States)

- Sisler SF-1 Pipit
- Sisler SF-2 Whistler
- Sisler SF-2A Cygnet

=== SITAR ===
(Sociètè Industrielle de Tolerie pour l'Aéronautique et Matériel Roulant)

- SITAR GY-90 Mowgli
- SITAR GY-100 Bagheera
- SITAR GY-110 Sher Khan

=== Sivel Aeronautica ===
- Sivel SD27 Corriedale
- Sivel SD28

=== Six Chuter ===
(Yakima, Washington, United States)

- Six Chuter SR1
- Six Chuter SR2
- Six Chuter SR5
- Six Chuter SR7
- Six Chuter Power Hawk
- Six Chuter Discovery
- Six Chuter Legend P103UL
- Six Chuter Legend SE
- Six Chuter Legend XL
- Six Chuter Legend XL Paragon 912
- Six Chuter Skye Ryder Aerochute

=== Sizer ===
- Sizer Rosette
- Sizer Sapphire
