= CAB Minicab =

Light aircraft type (prod. 1949–1955)

GY-20 Minicab
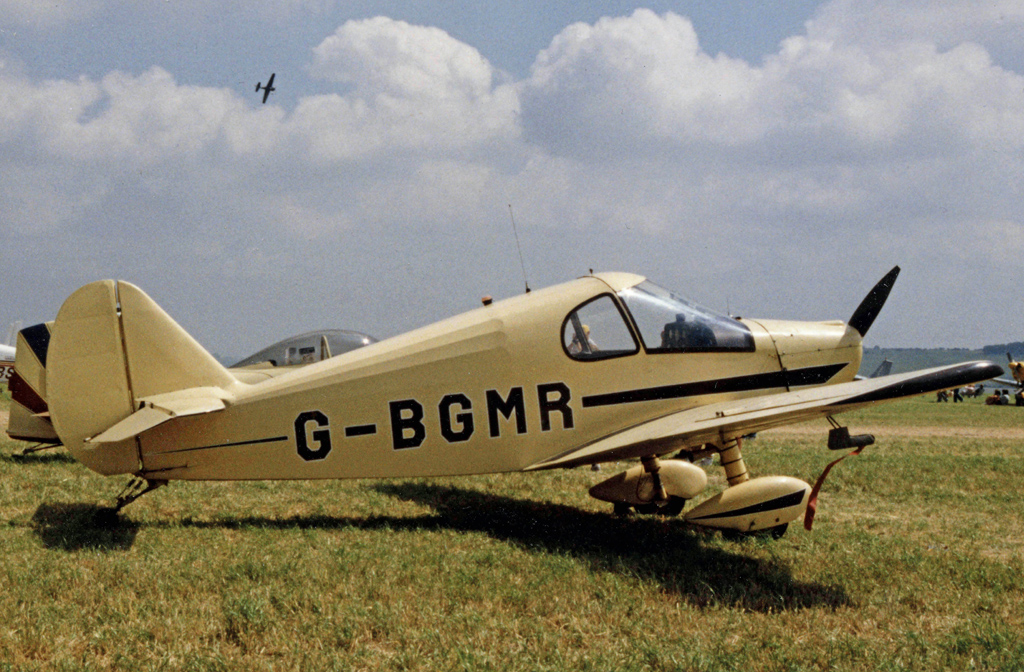
- GY-201 Amateur-built in the UK

General information
- Type: light aircraft
- Manufacturer: Constructions Aéronautiques du Béarn
- Designer: Yves Gardan
- Number built: 65 + ca. 130 homebuilt

History
- First flight: 1 February 1949
- Variant: GY-30 Supercab

The CAB GY-20 Minicab is a two-seat light aircraft designed by Yves Gardan and built in France by Construction Aeronautiques du Bearn (CAB) in the years immediately following World War II. CAB was formed in 1948 by Yves Gardan, Max Lapoerte and M. Dubouts.

== Design and development ==
The Minicab is a conventional, low-wing cantilever monoplane with fixed tailwheel undercarriage, powered by a Continental A65 engine. Its design was a scaled-down version of the aircraft that Yves Gardan had designed for SIPA, the SIPA S.90. The pilot and passenger sit side by side and access to the cockpit is via a one-piece perspex canopy that hinges forwards. Gardan's intention was to produce a low-cost, easy-to-fly, easy-to-maintain aircraft with the possibility of homebuilding.

== Production ==
The prototype Minicab first flew at Pau-Idron on 1 February 1949 with Max Fischl at the controls. CAB manufactured a total of about 65 Minicabs when production ended in 1955. The rights for the plans were then acquired by Arthur Ord-Hume in the United Kingdom who re-drew the drawings and made various minor changes for homebuilders, incorporating the improvements developed by M. Jean Barritault on his JB.01 Minicab. Ord-Hume sold many copies of his GY.201 plans to amateur builders in the United Kingdom, France, Canada, New Zealand and other countries around the world. There is about 20 Minicabs currently registered in the United Kingdom, many of which are powered by a Continental C90 engine.

Falconar sold plans for a tricycle gear homebuilt model named the Minihawk. Another development is the K&S or Squarecraft Cavalier which is a redesigned Minicab in several versions with plans translated from French to English and modified by Stan Mcleod. The plans were marketed by K&S Aircraft of Calgary, Alberta and later MacFam.

== Operational history ==
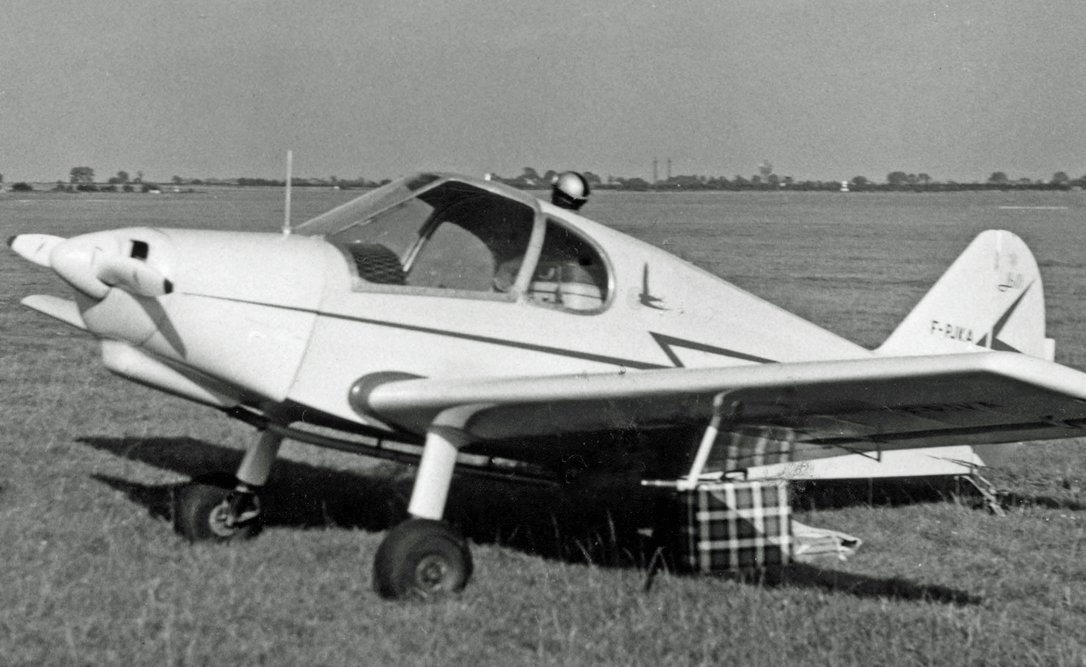
Minicab built to Barritault JB.01 standard at Cranfield in 1960

Type certification was obtained in mid-April 1949. By the end of 1950, a Minicab had won the Coupe de Vitesse de Deauville (Deauville Cup for speed), and the Grand Prix Aérien de Vichy (Vichy Aerial Prize). The following year, a Minicab broke the world air distance record for its class (1,825 km, 1,138 miles) and in 1952 it attained the world airspeed record for its class over a 2,000 km circuit, with an average speed of (183 km/h, 114 mph).

One Minicab, G-AWEP, was flown by the ex-RAF fighter pilot Roland Beamont who was a test pilot at BAC Samlesbury. He made its first flight in 1969 and wrote that "the Minicab felt light and very responsive... landing required the delicate touch of a Spitfire pilot. In fact the overall control harmony is not dissimilar to that classic aeroplane".

== Variants ==
GY-20 Minicab
CAB first production model.
GY-201 Minicab
refined version with increased fuel capacity, reduced wingspan, strengthened undercarriage, split flaps, and castoring tailwheel. CAB final production model and also principal homebuilt version.
Barritault JB.01 Minicab
one modified aircraft built by M. Jean Barritault; these improvements were incorporated into Ord-Hume's GY.201 plans.
Falconar Hawk
Minicabs built to plans supplied by Falconar
Falconar MiniHawk
plans-built design from Falconar with tricycle undercarriage.
MacFam Cavalier (K&S or Squarecraft Cavalier)
Redesigned in several versions principally with tricycle and swept tail surfaces, and strengthened for a more powerful engine.

== Specifications (GY-20) ==
Data from Jane's All The World's Aircraft 1956–57

General characteristics

- Crew: one
- Capacity: one passenger
- Length: 5.45 m (17 ft 11 in)
- Wingspan: 8.14 m (26 ft 8 in)
- Height: 1.65 m (5 ft 5 in)
- Wing area: 10.15 m^{2} (109.3 sq ft)
- Empty weight: 270 kg (595 lb)
- Gross weight: 485 kg (1,069 lb)
- Fuel capacity: 50 L (11 imp gal; 13 US gal)
- Powerplant: 1 × Continental A65 four-cylinder air-cooled horizontally-opposed piston engine, 48 kW (65 hp)
- Propellers: 2-bladed Merville wooden, 1.64 m (5 ft 5 in) diameter

Performance

- Maximum speed: 180 km/h (110 mph, 97 kn)
- Cruise speed: 170 km/h (110 mph, 92 kn)
- Service ceiling: 4,000 m (13,000 ft)
- Rate of climb: 3.0 m/s (590 ft/min)
- Take-off run to 20 m (66 ft): 370 m (1,210 ft)
- Landing run from 20 m (66 ft): 343 m (1,125 ft)

== See also ==
- SIPA S.90
- Levi RL3 Monsoon
