= CAB Supercab =

Light aircraft

GY-30 Supercab
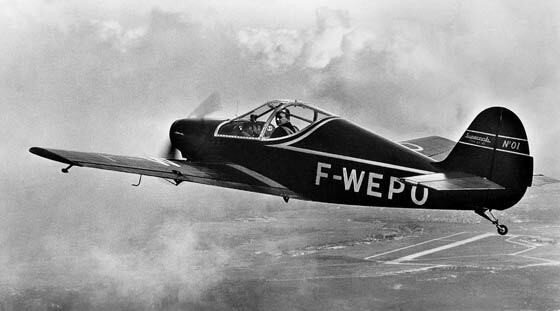

General information
- Type: Utility aircraft
- Manufacturer: Constructions Aéronautiques du Béarn (CAB)
- Designer: Yves Gardan
- Number built: 7

History
- First flight: 5 February 1954
- Developed into: SIPA 1000

The CAB GY-30 Supercab was a two-seat light aircraft built in France in 1954, as a further development of the CAB Minicab. The design was performed by Yves Gardan, a onetime employee of French aeronautical company SIPA. Changes incorporated in the Supercab (from the Minicab) included a more powerful engine, greater wingspan, manually retractable undercarriage, and slotted flaps that replaced the split flaps of the Minicab.

Seven units were constructed by CAB before the rights to the design were sold to Gardan's former employer (SIPA), who developed the design into the SIPA 1000. However, due to a downturn in the light aircraft market at that time, only three of the SIPA variant were produced before production was halted.

== Specifications ==
Data from Jane's All The World's Aircraft 1956–57

General characteristics

- Crew: 1
- Capacity: 1 passenger
- Length: 5.50 m (18 ft 1 in)
- Wingspan: 8.20 m (26 ft 11 in)
- Height: 1.65 m (5 ft 5 in)
- Wing area: 10.30 m^{2} (110.9 sq ft)
- Aspect ratio: 6.5:1
- Empty weight: 400 kg (882 lb)
- Gross weight: 613 kg (1,351 lb)
- Fuel capacity: 70 L (15 imp gal; 18 US gal)
- Powerplant: 1 × Continental C90 air-cooled four-cylinder horizontally opposed piston engine, 67 kW (90 hp)
- Propellers: 2-bladed fixed pitch

Performance

- Maximum speed: 275 km/h (171 mph, 148 kn)
- Cruise speed: 235 km/h (146 mph, 127 kn)
- Service ceiling: 5,000 m (16,000 ft)
- Rate of climb: 3.90 m/s (767 ft/min)
- Take-off run to 20 m (66 ft): 340 m (1,120 ft)
- Landing run from 20 m (66 ft): 300 m (980 ft)
