= S13 =

S13 may refer to:

== Aviation ==
- Beriev S-13, an abandoned Soviet reconnaissance aircraft project
- Fokker S-13, a German trainer
- Letov Š-13, a Czechoslovak fighter aircraft
- SIAI S.13, an Italian reconnaissance biplane
- Sikorsky S-13, a Russian aircraft design proposal
- SPAD S.XIII, a French biplane fighter

== Automobiles ==
- Nissan Silvia (S13), a Japanese sports car
- Nissan 240SX (S13), a sports car sold in North America

== Rail and transit ==
=== Lines ===
- S13 (Rhine-Ruhr S-Bahn), Germany
- S13 (ZVV), Zurich, Switzerland
- Line S13 (Milan suburban railway service), Italy

=== Locomotives ===
- Sri Lanka Railways S13, a diesel multiple unit

=== Stations ===
- Iyo-Izushi Station, in Ōzu, Ehime Prefecture, Japan
- Mizuho Undōjō Nishi Station, in Mizuho-ku, Nagoya, Aichi Prefecture, Japan
- Otaru-Chikkō Station, in Otaru, Hokkaido, Japan
- Sōgō Undō Kōen Station, in Suma-ku, Kobe, Hyōgo Prefecture, Japan
- Sumiyoshi Station (Tokyo), in Kōtō, Tokyo, Japan

== Roads ==
- S13 highway (Georgia)
- County Route S13 (California), United States

== Science ==
- 40S ribosomal protein S13
- British NVC community S13, a swamps and tall-herb fens community in the British National Vegetation Classification system
- S13: Keep away from food, drink and animal feedingstuffs, a safety phrase
- S13, a star orbiting Sagittarius A*

== Vessels ==
- Brazilian submarine Rio de Janeiro (S13)
- HMCS Renard (S13), an armed yacht of the Royal Canadian Navy
- HMS Osiris (S13), a submarine of the Royal Navy
- Soviet submarine S-13
- USS S-13 (SS-118), a submarine of the United States Navy

== Other uses ==
- S13 (classification), a disability swimming classification
- S-13 rocket, a Soviet air-to-ground rocket weapon
- Shayetet 13, a unit of the Israel Defense Forces
- S13, a postcode district in Sheffield, England
