= Chuter =

Chuter is a surname. Notable people with the name include:

- George Chuter (born 1976), English rugby player
- James Chuter Ede (1882–1965), British teacher, trade unionist and Labour politician
- Penny Chuter (1942–2024), British former international sculler, rowing coach and rowing administrator
- Robert Chuter (born 1964), Australian theatre director

== See also ==
- Six Chuter, American aircraft manufacturer
