= S52 =

S52 may refer to:

- S52 (New York City bus), serving Staten Island
- BMW S52, an automobile engine
- Expressway S52 (Poland)
- S52: Not recommended for interior use on large surface areas, a safety phrase
- SIAI S.52, an Italian prototype fighter aircraft
- Sikorsky S-52, an American helicopter
- Shorland S52, a British armoured car
