= S93 =

S93 may refer to:

- S93 (New York City bus) serving Staten Island
- County Route S93 (Bergen County, New Jersey)
- HMS Triumph (S93), a submarine of the Royal Navy
- SIPA S.93, a French training aircraft
