= UAV (disambiguation) =

A UAV is an unmanned aerial vehicle, commonly known as a drone.

UAV may also refer to:

== Drones ==
- UAV Cypher or Sikorsky Cypher, a type of unmanned aerial vehicle developed by Sikorsky Aircraft
- UAV Outback Challenge or UAV Challenge - Outback Rescue, an annual competition for the development of unmanned aerial vehicles
- UAV Sci-Tech UAV, Chinese UCAVs developed by Beijing UAV Sci-Tech Co., Ltd
- Unmanned combat aerial vehicle (UCAV), also known as a combat drone or simply a drone
- Vrabac Mini UAV, a mini drone intended for day/night reconnaissance and surveillance at shorter distances, as well as for target finding and designating

== Organizations ==
- UAV Corporation or UAV Entertainment
- Ukrainian American Veterans
- University of Antelope Valley

== Other ==
- "UAV", a song by Che from the album Rest in Bass, 2025
