= S53 =

S53 may refer to:

- S53 (New York City bus), serving Staten Island
- Dhurga language, an Australian Aboriginal language
- S53: Avoid exposure - obtain special instructions before use, a safety phrase
- Shorland S53, a British armoured car
- Sikorsky S-53, an American helicopter
- Tsonga language, a Bantu language
- Saviem S53, a Saviem bus model
- Toyota S53, a Toyota S transmission
- ZIS-S-53, an Anti air and Anti-tank gun
