= S68 =

S68 may refer to:

- S-68, a Greenlandic sport club
- S68 (Long Island bus)
- S68 (Rhine-Ruhr S-Bahn), a commuter rail line
- BMW S68, an automobile engine
- County Route S68 (Bergen County, New Jersey)
- Gunaikurnai language
- Sikorsky S-68, an American helicopter design
- S68, a type of New Zealand standard school building
- Siemens S68, a Siemens mobile phone
