= Silent Family Silent Glider M =

German ultralight trike motorglider

Silent Glider M

General information
- Type: Ultralight trike motor glider
- National origin: Germany
- Manufacturer: Silent Family
- Designer: Helmut Grossklaus
- Status: In production (2013)

The Silent Family Silent Glider M is a German ultralight trike motor glider, designed by Helmut Grossklaus and produced by Silent Family of Westerrade. The aircraft is supplied as a complete ready-to-fly-aircraft.

== Design and development ==
The Silent Glider M was designed to comply with the Fédération Aéronautique Internationale microlight category and the US FAR 103 Ultralight Vehicles rules. It features a cable-braced rigid hang glider-style high-wing, weight-shift pitch controls and aerodynamic roll controls, a single-seat enclosed cockpit with a bubble canopy, retractable tricycle landing gear and a single engine in pusher configuration.

The aircraft is made from composites, with its double surface rigid wing mounted with the pitch control bar though a slot in the bubble canopy. The pilot seating position is reclined. Various rigid wings can be used and the typical one has a 14.0 m (45.9 ft) span. The powerplant is a single cylinder, air-cooled, two-stroke, 28 hp (21 kW) Hirth F33 engine or, optionally, a Geiger or Flytec electric motor, powering a two-bladed folding composite propeller. With the Hirth engine the aircraft has an empty weight of 118.5 kg (261 lb) and a gross weight of 231 kg (509 lb), giving a useful load of 112.5 kg (248 lb). With full fuel of 22 litres (4.8 imp gal; 5.8 US gal) the payload is 97 kg (214 lb).

The Silent Glider M can use the Aeros Stalker, A-I-R Atos or Flight Design Exxtacy wings, which are provided by the builder. The fuselage and wing combination produces a 20:1 glide ratio and a minimum sink rate of 0.8 m/s (160 ft/min).

== Variants ==
Silent Glider M
Version powered by a 28 hp (21 kW) Hirth F33 petrol engine
Silent Glider e-M
Version powered by a Geiger electric motor, introduced in 2009
Silent Glider ME
Version powered by a Flytec HPD10 electric motor

== Specifications (Silent Glider M) ==
Data from Bayerl

General characteristics

- Crew: one
- Wingspan: 14 m (45 ft 11 in)
- Wing area: 16 m^{2} (170 sq ft)
- Empty weight: 118.5 kg (261 lb)
- Gross weight: 231 kg (509 lb)
- Fuel capacity: 22 litres (4.8 imp gal; 5.8 US gal)
- Powerplant: 1 × Hirth F33 single cylinder, air-cooled, two stroke aircraft engine, 21 kW (28 hp)
- Propellers: 2-bladed composite, folding

Performance

- Maximum speed: 100 km/h (62 mph, 54 kn)
- Cruise speed: 90 km/h (56 mph, 49 kn)
- Stall speed: 40 km/h (25 mph, 22 kn)
- Maximum glide ratio: 20:1
- Rate of climb: 3.4 m/s (670 ft/min)
- Rate of sink: 0.8 m/s (160 ft/min)
- Wing loading: 14.4 kg/m^{2} (2.9 lb/sq ft)
