= Silent Family =

German aircraft manufacturer

- Company type: Privately held company
- Industry: Aerospace
- Headquarters: Westerrade, Germany
- Key people: Helmut Grossklaus
- Products: Ultralight trikes
- Website: silentfamily.de

Silent Family is a German aircraft manufacturer based in Westerrade and owned by Helmut Grossklaus. The company specializes in the design and manufacture of ultralight trikes.

The company's first product, the Silent Glider M is described as "very original" by Bertrand et al. It takes a rigid wing hang glider and adds a pod fuselage, with a bubble canopy to transform the aircraft into an enclosed cockpit, retractable landing gear-equipped ultralight motor glider.

The Silent Racer is a similar concept, but an open-cockpit, powered podded fuselage that uses a conventional flexible hang glider wing.

== Aircraft ==
Summary of aircraft built by Silent Family
Model name	First flight	Number built	Type
Silent Family Silent Glider M			podded fuselage ultralight trike using a rigid wing
Silent Family Silent Racer			podded fuselage ultralight trike using a flex wing
