= MacFam Cavalier =

Canadian-French light aircraft

Cavalier
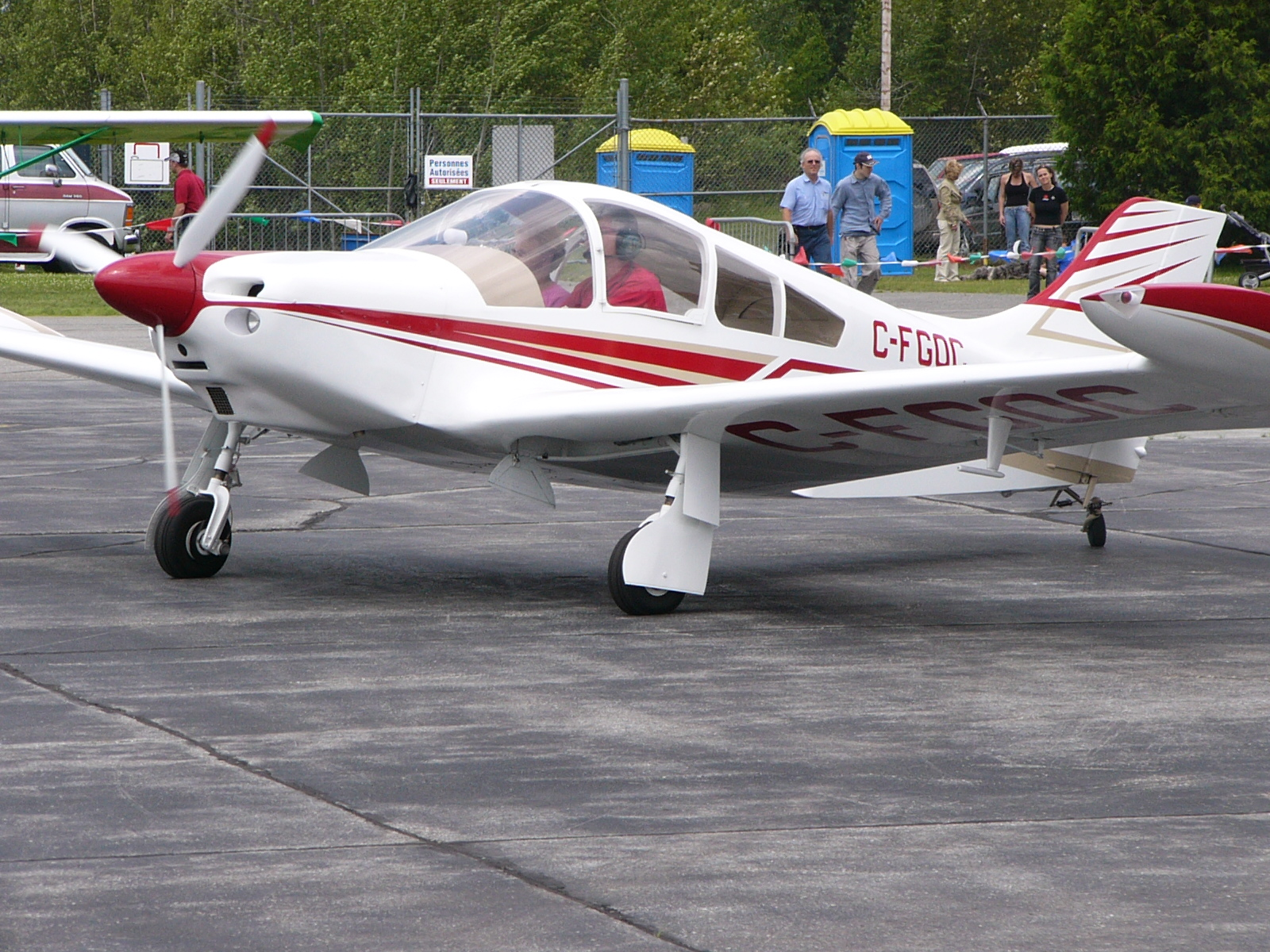
- Cavalier SA102.5 with retractable landing gear

General information
- Type: Homebuilt aircraft
- National origin: Canada, France
- Manufacturer: MacFam, K&S Aircraft
- Designer: Stan McLeod

History
- Introduction date: 1963
- First flight: 1963 Model SA102
- Developed from: GY-20 Minicab

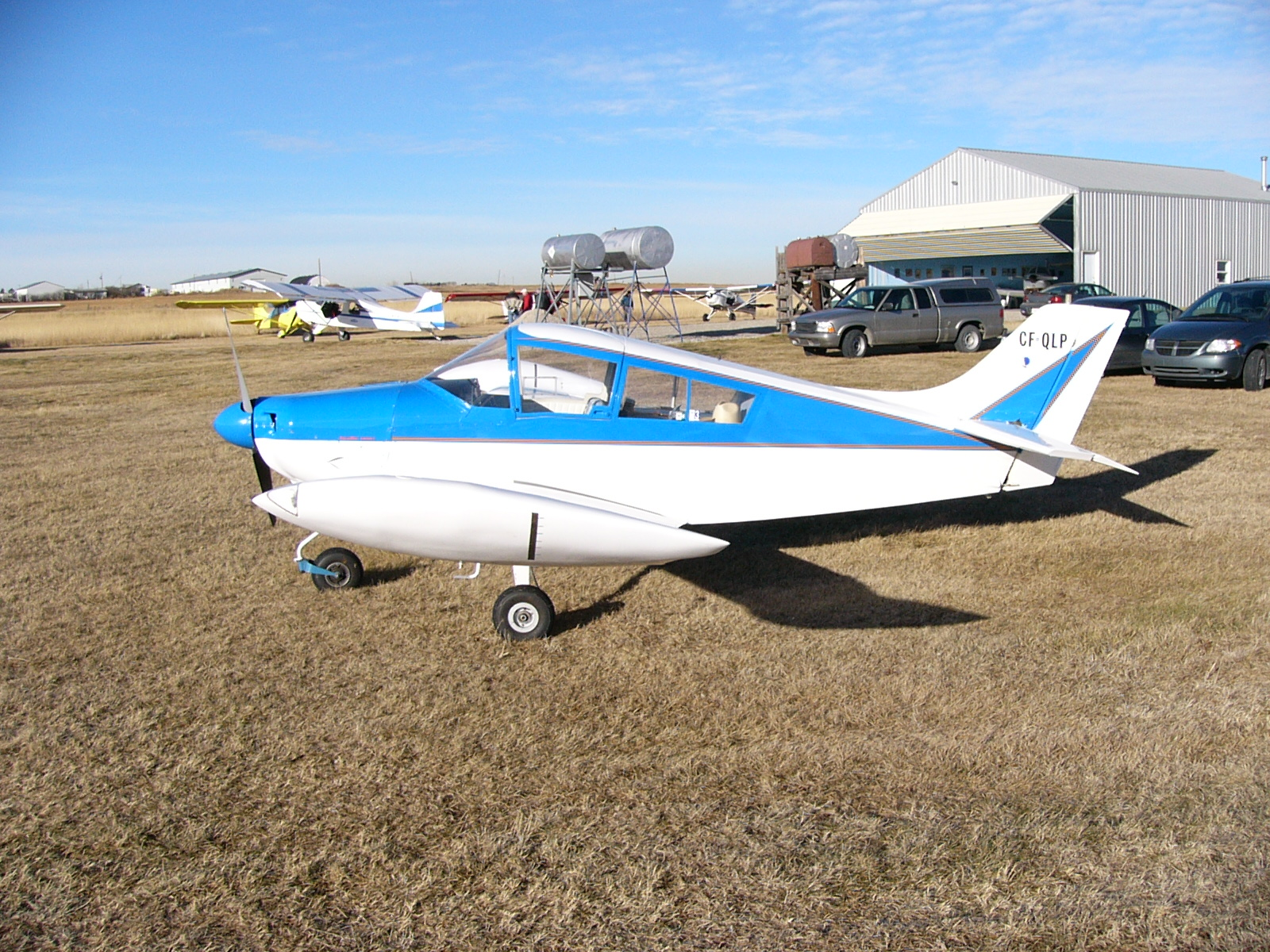
Cavalier SA102.5

The MacFam Cavalier is a homebuilt aircraft designed by Stan McLeod, developed through a progressing series of models, all using all-wooden construction. The model range includes the SA102, SA102.5, SA103, SA104 and the SA105.

== Design and development ==
The Cavalier was a new design based on the French wooden homebuilt GY-20 Minicab designed by Yves Gardan in 1949. The plans were translated from French to English and modified by Stan McLeod. The plans were marketed by K&S Aircraft of Calgary, Alberta and later MacFam.

The Cavalier is a two-seat side-by-side configuration homebuilt that uses all-wood construction. The landing gear may be configured as fixed, or retractable, in tricycle or conventional layout. The wing uses a single box spar covered in 3/32" plywood leading edge skins. The entire wing is fabric covered.

The early Cavalier SA102 series can accept any four cylinder aircraft engine ranging in weight up to 235 lb (107 kg) and 85 to 135 hp (63 to 101 kW), including the Continental O-200, Lycoming O-235 and Franklin 4AC. Later series can use larger engines. SA102 options included wing tip tanks and a third jump seat.

== Variants ==
SA102
1963 Interchangeable tricycle gear to conventional gear configuration with sliding canopy.
SA102.5
1968 model
SA103
Conventional gear version of Super Cavalier
SA104
Tricycle gear version of Super Cavalier
SA105 Super Cavalier
1968 model retractable tricycle gear model. Engineered for larger 200hp engines.

== Aircraft on display ==
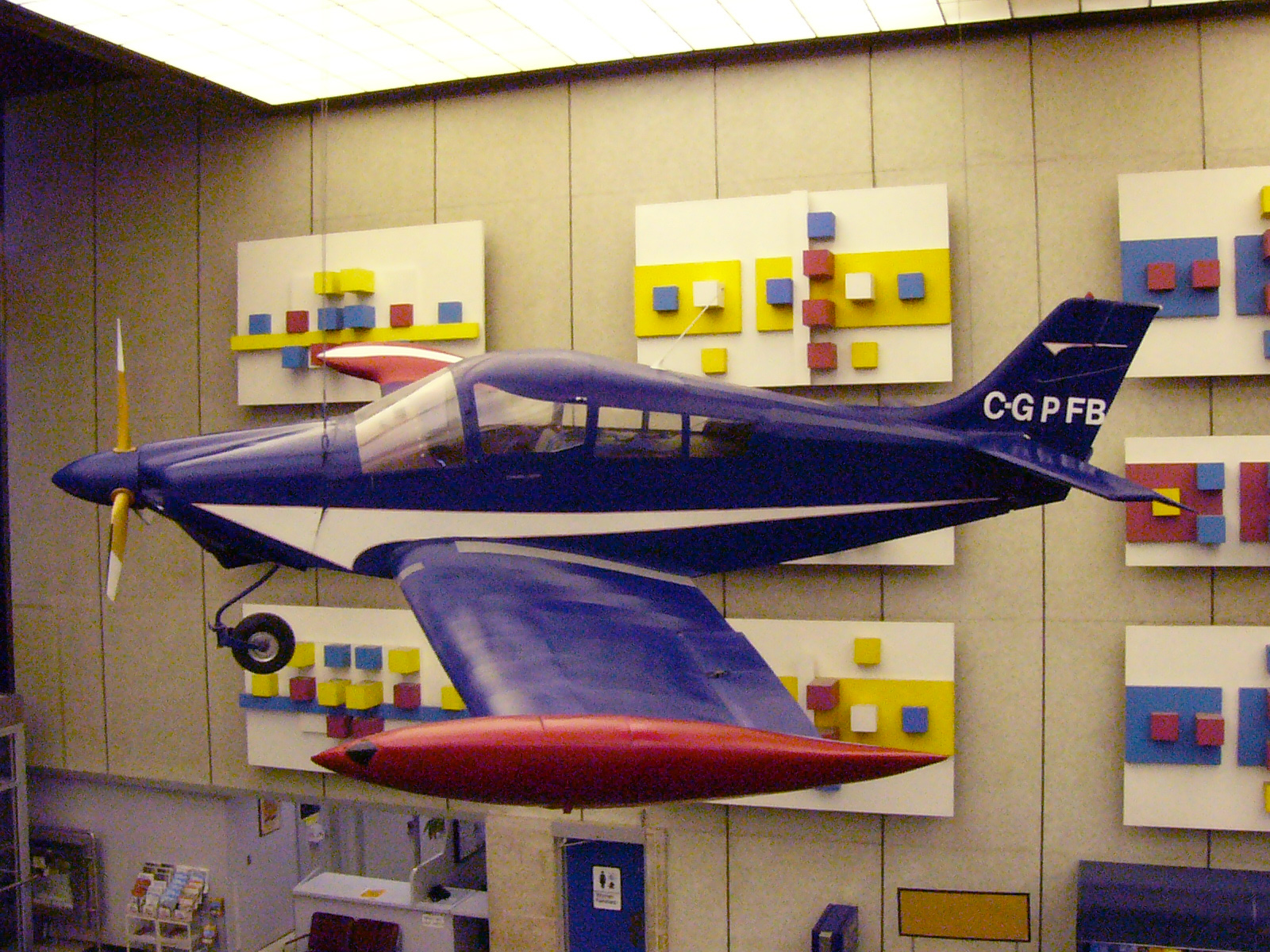
Cavalier SA102.5 on display in the main terminal building of the Winnipeg James Armstrong Richardson International Airport

- Winnipeg James Armstrong Richardson International Airport - main terminal building.

== Specifications (SA105 Super Cavalier) ==
Data from Flying

General characteristics

- Crew: 1
- Capacity: 1
- Length: 7.252 m (23 ft 9.5 in)
- Wingspan: 8.33 m (27 ft 4 in)
- Wing area: 10.9 m^{2} (117 sq ft)
- Airfoil: NACA 23115 (root), NACA 23010 (tip)
- Gross weight: 839 kg (1,850 lb)
- Fuel capacity: 34 U.S. gallons (130 L; 28 imp gal) main tanks, 22 U.S. gallons (83 L; 18 imp gal) tip tanks optional

Performance

- Maximum speed: 390 km/h (240 mph, 210 kn)
- Cruise speed: 320 km/h (200 mph, 170 kn)
- Stall speed: 101 km/h (63 mph, 55 kn)
- Rate of climb: 6.6 m/s (1,300 ft/min)

== See also ==
Related development

- CAB Minicab
