= Levi RL3 Monsoon =

RL3 Monsoon

General information
- Type: Homebuilt aircraft
- National origin: India
- Designer: Renato Levi

History
- Introduction date: 1958

The Levi RL3 Monsoon is an Indian homebuilt aircraft that was developed in the late 1950s. It was also marketed as the AFCO Shipyard company RL.3 Monsoon and Western Aircraft Supplies Monsoon.

== Design and development ==
The RL3 Monsoon is a side-by-side configuration, two seat, low wing aircraft of wood and fabric construction, equipped with conventional landing gear. It was designed and tested in India by "Sonny" Renato Levi, an Italian designer who had joined the Royal Air Force in England, studied aircraft design, and become a boat designer in Italy. Able to accommodate engines from 85 to 125 hp (63 to 93 kW), the design was later marketed as a kit in Canada by Western Aircraft Supplies.

== Specifications (RL3 Monsoon) ==
Data from Plane & Pilot

General characteristics

- Crew: one
- Capacity: one passenger
- Length: 6.17 m (20 ft 3 in)
- Wingspan: 7.87 m (25 ft 10 in)
- Height: 1.6 m (5 ft 3 in)
- Wing area: 10.3 m^{2} (111 sq ft)
- Empty weight: 395 kg (870 lb)
- Gross weight: 680 kg (1,500 lb)
- Fuel capacity: 110 litres (24 imp gal; 29 US gal)
- Powerplant: 1 × Continental C-85-8F horizontally-opposed air-cooled piston engine, 63 kW (85 hp)
- Propellers: 2-bladed

Performance

- Maximum speed: 210 km/h (130 mph, 110 kn)
- Cruise speed: 185 km/h (115 mph, 100 kn)
- Stall speed: 72 km/h (45 mph, 39 kn)
- Never exceed speed: 72 km/h (45 mph, 39 kn)
- Range: 970 km (600 mi, 520 nmi)
- Rate of climb: 4.1 m/s (800 ft/min)
- Take-off run: 150 m (500 ft)
- Landing roll: 210 m (700 ft)

== See also ==
Aircraft of comparable role, configuration, and era

- Minicab Hawk
