= Silent Family Silent Racer =

German ultraight trike

Silent Racer

General information
- Type: Ultralight trike
- National origin: Germany
- Manufacturer: Silent Family
- Designer: Helmut Grossklaus
- Status: In production (2013)

The Silent Family Silent Racer is a German ultralight trike, designed by Helmut Grossklaus and produced by Silent Family of Westerrade. The aircraft is supplied as a complete ready-to-fly-aircraft.

== Design and development ==
The Silent Racer was designed to comply with the Fédération Aéronautique Internationale microlight category, including the category's maximum gross weight of 450 kg (992 lb). The aircraft has a maximum gross weight of 450 kg (992 lb). It features a cable-braced hang glider-style high-wing, weight-shift controls, a two-seats-in-tandem open cockpit with a windshield, retractable tricycle landing gear and a single engine in pusher configuration.

The aircraft is made from composites, with its double surface wing covered in Dacron sailcloth. A variety of wings can be used from 10 to 12 m (32.8 to 39.4 ft) in span and 10 to 15 m^{2} (110 to 160 sq ft) in area, all supported by a single tube-type kingpost and employing an "A" frame weight-shift control bar. The powerplant is a twin cylinder, air-cooled, two-stroke, dual-ignition 53 hp (40 kW) Hirth 2704 engine or 65 hp (48 kW) Hirth 2706. The aircraft has an empty weight of 200 kg (441 lb) and a gross weight of 450 kg (992 lb), giving a useful load of 250 kg (551 lb). With full fuel of 57 litres (13 imp gal; 15 US gal) the payload is 209 kg (461 lb).

== Specifications (Silent Racer) ==
Data from Bayerl

General characteristics

- Crew: one
- Capacity: one passenger
- Wingspan: 10 m (32 ft 10 in)
- Wing area: 10 m^{2} (110 sq ft)
- Empty weight: 200 kg (441 lb)
- Gross weight: 450 kg (992 lb)
- Fuel capacity: 57 litres (13 imp gal; 15 US gal)
- Powerplant: 1 × Hirth 2704 twin cylinder, air-cooled, two stroke aircraft engine, 40 kW (53 hp)
- Propellers: 4-bladed composite

Performance

- Maximum speed: 140 km/h (87 mph, 76 kn)
- Cruise speed: 100 km/h (62 mph, 54 kn)
- Stall speed: 45 km/h (28 mph, 24 kn)
- Rate of climb: 4.0 m/s (790 ft/min)
- Wing loading: 45.0 kg/m^{2} (9.2 lb/sq ft)
