= Constructions Aéronautiques du Béarn =

Constructions Aéronautiques du Béarn (CAB) was a French aircraft manufacturer established by Max Laporte and Yves Gardan in Pau, Béarn in 1948. Its main product was the Minicab, a two-seat low-wing monoplane light aircraft of Gardan's design constructed in wood with a fabric covering, and equipped with a fixed tailwheel undercarriage, while the similar Supercab had a retractable undercarriage and detail refinements. The company ceased business in the mid-1950s.

== Aircraft ==
- CAB Minicab
- CAB Supercab
