= Simplex Red Arrow =

Red Arrow
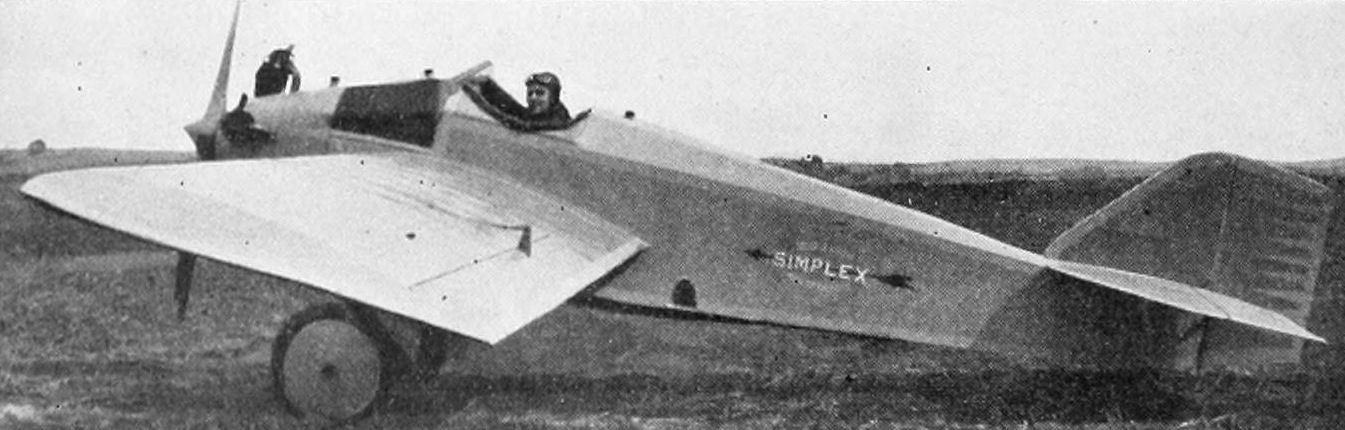
- K-2-S Red Arrow

General information
- Type: Civil light transport
- National origin: US
- Manufacturer: Simplex Aircraft Corporation
- Designer: Omer Woodson
- Number built: about 20

History
- First flight: 1927-8
- Developed from: Wooodson M-6

The Simplex Red Arrow was a US single-engined monoplane produced in the late 1920s and early 1930s and intended as club machine or mail transport. Most used radial engines in the 90–110 hp (67–82 kW) range. They carried one or two passengers whose seats could be open or enclosed. One variant, the Red Arrow Dual Plane, was easily converted from monoplane to biplane and was available with two versions of the much more powerful Wright Whirlwind engines. In all about 20 were built.

== Design and development ==
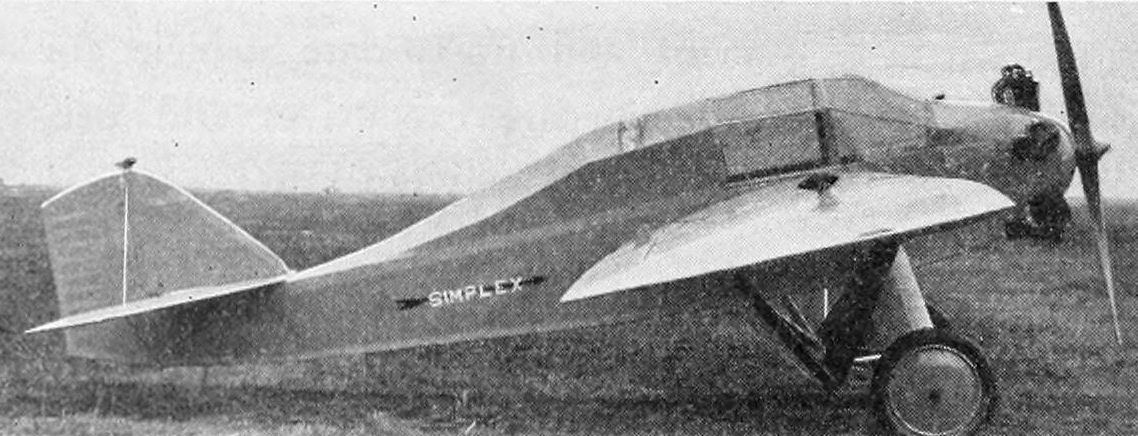
K-2-C Red Arrow

The Red Arrow was designed by Omer Woodson and was a development of his Woodson M-6, a low power, low wing monoplane powered by a 60 hp (45 kW) Detroit Cat engine. They were intended for commercial club use, including training and general flying as well as for mail-carrying, seen as an important profit-earner at the time. The early Red Arrows were externally braced mid-wing monoplane designs with 90–100 hp (67–75 kW), five cylinder Kinner K-5 radial engines.

The Kinner-powered Red Arrows had a rectangular plan wing, braced from below with V-struts enclosed in streamlined fairings between a rearward extension of the undercarriage structure and the two wing spars. The engine was mounted with its cylinders exposed for cooling out of a conical metal cowling but behind it the fuselage was a flat-sided steel tube structure. The open cockpit version (K-2-S) had side-by-side seating over mid-wing and the two seat cabin equipped K-2-C had a revised upper fuselage including a long, angular enclosure with forward glazing. The pilot's downward view was severely limited by the wing, so transparent panels in the lower fuselage sides were installed to help him. No images of the three seat cabin K-3-C are known. All versions had provision for passengers' luggage or mail. The tailplane was mounted on top of the fuselage and braced to a blunted triangular fin that carried a straight-edged unbalanced rudder.

The undercarriage was conventional with mainwheels on semi-split axles, their outer ends on faired vertical legs with rubber chord shock absorbers. Centrally, the axles were hinged together onto a single strut running rearwards to the central fuselage underside. Brakes were an option.

About ten of the Kinner-powered Red Arrows were built.

In 1929 two new Red Arrows were flown. The W-2-S was a K-2-S development with a 110 hp (82 kW), seven cylinder Warner Scarab radial engine. Its wings were braced with pairs of twin, parallel, faired struts to the lower fuselage and its undercarriage had independent legs and drag struts. It received its type certificate in September 1929. About ten, including one K-2-S conversion, were built.

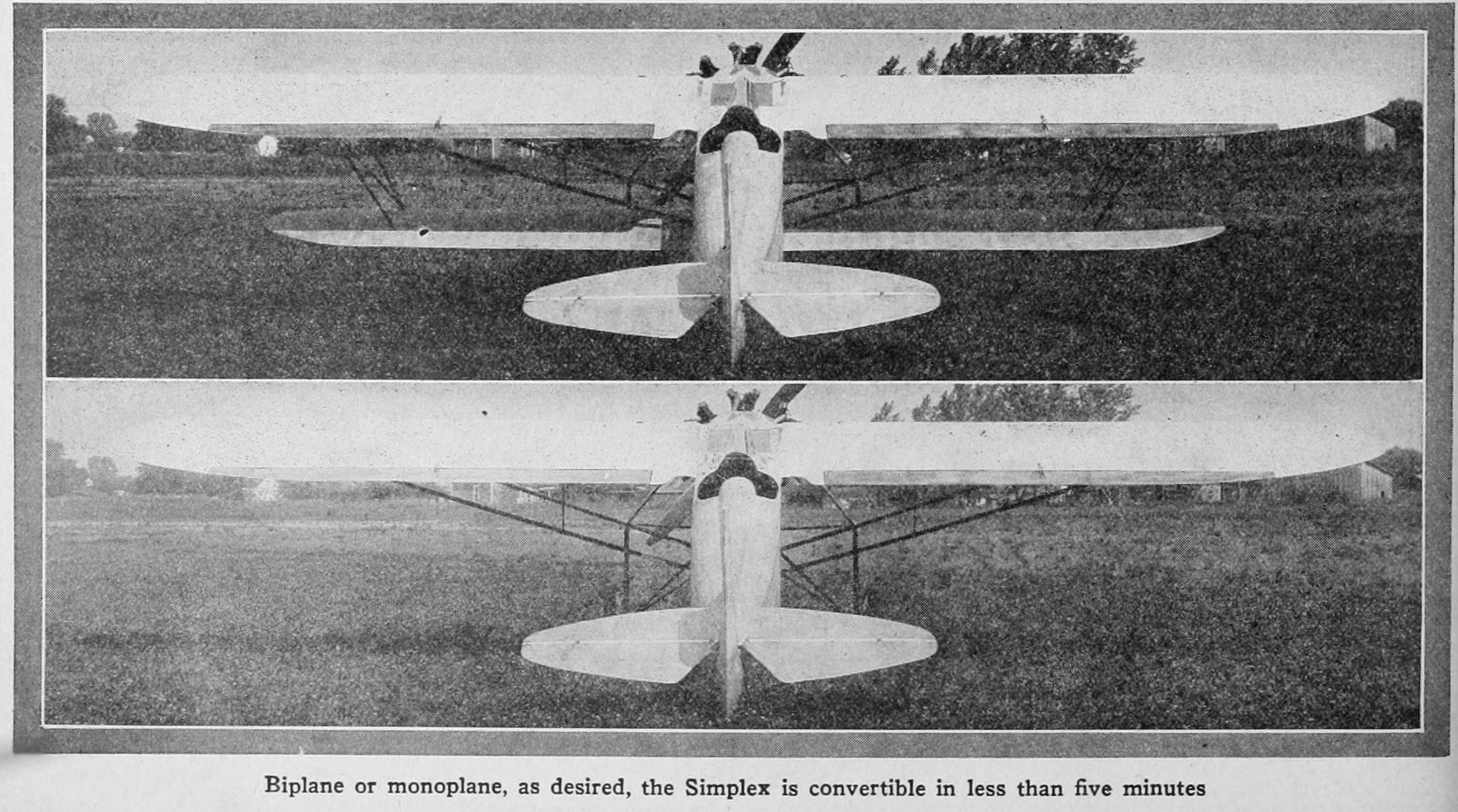

The other, and most unusual, Red Arrow type was the Red Arrow Dual Plane or Simplex Racer, an aircraft capable of rapid conversion between monoplane (fast) and biplane (greater load) configurations. Although rare, a few other such designs were built and flown; the Parnall Pixie III was an earlier, though non-commercial, example from 1924. The Racer had a high upper wing instead of the mid-wing of the earlier Red Arrows but with a similar span (32 ft 9 in (9.98 m)) and chord, though more tapered towards the tips. They were braced to the lower fuselage by parallel pairs of cross braced struts. When required the shorter span (24 ft (7.3 m)) lower wings were attached to the lower fuselage longerons and braced to the upper wing with a pair of N-form interplane struts. The wing area, 140 sq ft (13 m^{2}) in monoplane configuration, increased to 200 sq ft (19 m^{2}) in biplane mode. It was claimed that mounting or demounting the lower wing took only five minutes.

The open cockpit of the Dual Plane was moved rearward to a position well behind the upper trailing edge. Its landing gear was also altered, with mainwheels on vertical legs from the forward wing struts at points strengthened by horizontal struts to the fuselage and oblique struts to the wings. The bottom end of the legs were joined to the lower fuselage with V-struts. A forward stagger of 24.75 in (629 mm) allowed the leg to clear the lower leading edge.

The Dual Plane was offered with a choice of two engines, both much more powerful than the Kinner. Both were Wright J-6 Whirlwind radials, one a 165 hp (123 kW), five cylinder J-6-5 and the other a 225 hp (168 kW), seven cylinder J-6-7. For either engine the monoplane version was about 10% faster than the biplane but the latter could deliver a payload of 600 lb (270 kg), three times heavier. The biplane configuration was therefore suited to regular passenger and goods transport, with the monoplane configuration reserved for sports and urgent operations. Alternatively, the biplane could be used as a basic trainer then converted to a monoplane for advanced students.

== Operational history ==
Little is known about the routine service history of the twenty or so Kinner- and Warner-powered aircraft. There were successes at competitive events: a K-2-S was the A-class section winner from a field of 16 in the 1928 Californian air race between Los Angeles and San Francisco. It flew the 570 mi (920 km; 500 nmi) at an average speed of 126 mph (203 km/h; 109 kn). At the 1929 Nationals, held in Cleveland, the Racer was flown as a single seat monoplane with laps timed at 220 mph (350 km/h; 190 kn).

== Variants ==
Data from: Aerofiles Note:The alpha-numerical type numbers indicated engine-seats-other characteristics.

Simplex K-2-S Red Arrow
2 seat single open cockpit.

Simplex K-2-C Red Arrow
2 seat enclosed cabin. Together, about 10 K-2s were built.

Simplex K-3-C Red Arrow
3 seat enclosed cabin.

Simplex W-2-S
Warner Scarab engine, heavily revised undercarriage and wing struttage. About 10 built, though one was a K-2-S conversion.

Simplex R-2-D Red Arrow Dual Plane or Simplex Racer
Easily converted from fast monoplane to a biplane able to carry greater payloads. Choice of two Wright Whirlwind engines. Numerous smaller modifications including cockpit position and undercarriage. One built.

== Specifications (Kinner engine) ==
Data from Aero Digest (1928)

General characteristics

- Crew: one
- Capacity: one or two passengers
- Length: 20 ft (6.1 m)
- Wingspan: 33 ft 4 in (10.16 m)
- Empty weight: 1,000 lb (454 kg)
- Fuel capacity: 54 US gal (45 imp gal; 200 L)
- Useful load: 600 lb (270 kg)
- Powerplant: 1 × Kinner K-5 five cylinder radial, 100 hp (75 kW) at 1,800 rpm
- Propellers: 2-bladed Story or Hartzell fixed-pitch propeller

Performance

- Maximum speed: 120 mph (190 km/h, 100 kn)
- Cruise speed: 110 mph (180 km/h, 96 kn)
- Range: 800 mi (1,300 km, 700 nmi) for the three-seater and 1,200 mi (1,900 km; 1,000 nmi) for the two seater
- Service ceiling: 16,000 ft (4,900 m)
- Rate of climb: 600 ft/min (3.0 m/s)
- Landing speed: 30 mph (48 km/h; 26 kn)
- Take-off distance: 100–150 ft (30–46 m)
