= Sivel SD27 Corriedale =

SD27 Corriedale

General information
- Type: Two-seat light aircraft
- National origin: Italy
- Manufacturer: Sivel Aeronautica

History
- First flight: 1994

The Sivel SD27 Corriedale is an Italian two-seat light touring or training monoplane designed and built by Sivel Aeronautica. The Corriedale is a low-wing monoplane with side-by-side seating for two, and is powered by a nose-mounted Rotax 912 piston engine. It has a fixed landing gear with a swivelling nosewheel. Five pre-series aircraft were produced in 1994 before production started in 1995 and the aircraft was certified under the JAR-VLA. An aerobatic variant flew in 1995 with a larger 119 kW (160 hp) engine.

== Specifications ==
Data from Brassey's World Aircraft & Systems Directory

General characteristics

- Crew: 2
- Length: 6.57 m (21 ft 7 in)
- Wingspan: 10 m (32 ft 10 in)
- Height: 2.76 m (9 ft 1 in)
- Wing area: 12.5 m^{2} (134.55 sq ft)
- Empty weight: 370 kg (816 lb)
- Gross weight: 620 kg (1,367 lb)
- Powerplant: 1 × Rotax 912 piston engine , 58 kW (78 hp)

Performance

- Maximum speed: 195 km/h (121 mph, 105 kn)
- Range: 1,000 km (621 mi, 540 nmi)
- Service ceiling: 4,000 m (13,125 ft)
