= SIAI-Marchetti S.210 =

S.210
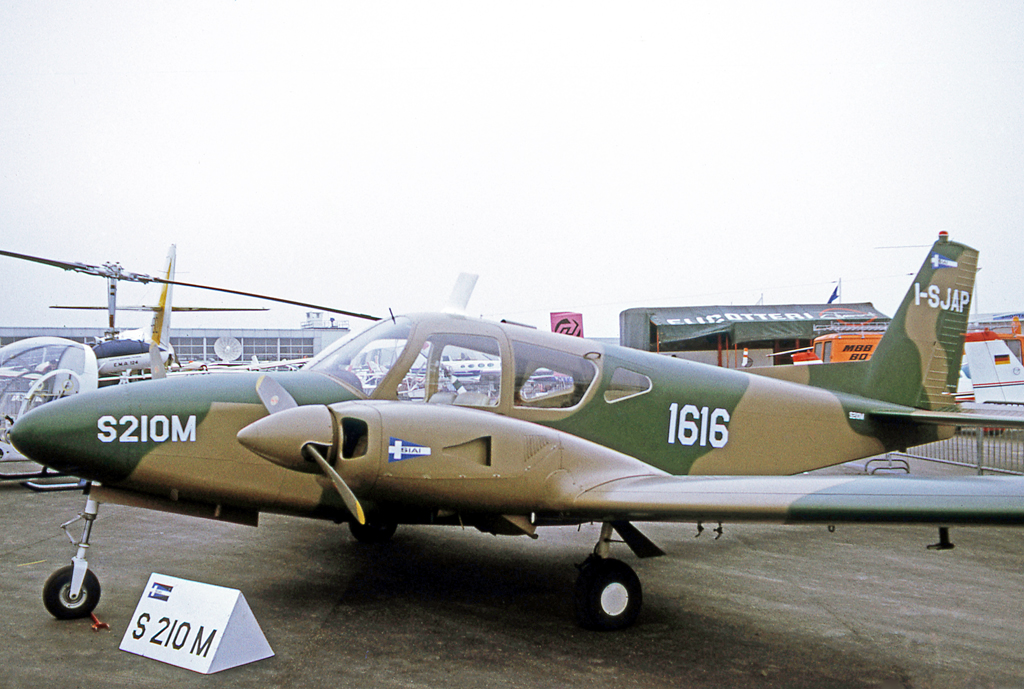
- The prototype S.210M exhibited at the 1971 Paris Air Show at Le Bourget Airport in June 1971

General information
- Type: Twin-engined cabin monoplane
- Manufacturer: SIAI-Marchetti
- Number built: 12

History
- First flight: 19 February 1970
- Developed from: SIAI-Marchetti S.205

The SIAI-Marchetti S.210 was a 1970s Italian twin-engined cabin-monoplane designed and built by SIAI-Marchetti as a development of the single-engined SIAI-Marchetti S.205.

== Development ==
The S.210 was developed from the single-engined S.205 and was an all-metal low-wing cantilever monoplane with a retractable tricycle landing gear. It was powered by two 200 hp (149 kW) Avco Lycoming TIO-360-A1B engines, one mounted on the leading edge of each wing. It had three pairs of side-by-side seats for one pilot and five passengers.

The prototype S.210M first flew on 18 February 1970 and was exhibited at the 1971 Paris Air Show wearing a military style colour scheme and markings. This aircraft was followed by an improved second prototype with increased baggage capacity and enlarged rear windows. A production batch of ten aircraft were built based on the second prototype.

== Specifications (S.210) ==
Data from Jane's All The World's Aircraft 1971-72

General characteristics

- Crew: 1
- Capacity: 5 passengers
- Length: 8.83 m (29 ft 0 in)
- Wingspan: 11.63 m (38 ft 2 in)
- Height: 3.33 m (10 ft 11 in)
- Wing area: 17.23 m^{2} (185.5 sq ft)
- Empty weight: 1,030 kg (2,271 lb)
- Gross weight: 1,850 kg (4,079 lb)
- Fuel capacity: 360 L (95 US gal; 79 imp gal)
- Powerplant: 2 × Avco Lycoming TIO-360-A1B flat-four piston engine , 150 kW (200 hp) each
- Propellers: 2-bladed Hartzell HC-C2YK-1B/8468-10R constant-speed propellers, 1.88 m (6 ft 2 in) diameter

Performance

- Maximum speed: 357 km/h (222 mph, 193 kn) at sea level
- Cruise speed: 314 km/h (195 mph, 170 kn) at 2,400 m (8,000 ft) (econ cruise)
- Range: 1,900 km (1,200 mi, 1,000 nmi) with maximum payload
- Service ceiling: 8,100 m (26,600 ft)
- Rate of climb: 10.1 m/s (1,980 ft/min)
- Take-off distance to 15 m (50 ft): 400 m (1,310 ft)
- Landing distance from 15 m (50 ft): 550 m (1,800 ft)

== See also ==
Related development

- SIAI-Marchetti S.205
- SIAI-Marchetti S.208
