= SIPA S.70 =

S.70

General information
- Type: Light transport aircraft
- National origin: France
- Manufacturer: SIPA
- Number built: 1

History
- First flight: 1949

The SIPA S.70 was a late 1940s French eight-passenger light transport aircraft prototype built by Société Industrielle Pour l’Aéronautique (SIPA).

== Design and development ==
The design for a commercial light transport for inter-city routes was started in 1947, the S.70 was a wooden, twin-engined, low-wing cantilever, cabin monoplane with a twin tail. Powered by two 210 hp (157 kW) Mathis G.8R piston engines it had room for six to eight passengers with a pilot sat centrally at the front. The prototype, registered F-WZCI, was flown in 1949 but very little else is known and it did not enter production.

== Specification ==
Data from French postwar transport aircraft, Jane's all the World's Aircraft 1947.

General characteristics

- Crew: 1
- Capacity: 6-8 passengers
- Length: 10.2 m (33 ft 6 in)
- Wingspan: 13.8 m (45 ft 3 in)
- Height: 3.6 m (11 ft 10 in)
- Wing area: 24.59 m^{2} (264.7 sq ft)
- Empty weight: 1,294 kg (2,853 lb)
- Gross weight: 2,428 kg (5,353 lb) with 8 passengers
- Powerplant: 2 × Mathis G.8R inverted air-cooled V-8 piston engines, 160 kW (210 hp) each
- Propellers: 2-bladed Legére variable-pitch airscrews

Performance

- Maximum speed: 270 km/h (170 mph, 150 kn)
- Cruise speed: 240 km/h (150 mph, 130 kn) 70% power
- Range: 1,000 km (620 mi, 540 nmi)
- Wing loading: 99 kg/m^{2} (20 lb/sq ft) with 8 passengers
- Fuel consumption: 0.238 kg/km (0.84 lb/mi)
- Power/mass: 9.18 kg/kW (15.1 lb/hp)

== See also ==
Aircraft of comparable role, configuration, and era

- Beechcraft Model 18

== Bibliography ==
- Chillon, Jacques; Dubois, Jean-Pierre & Wegg, John (1980). French Post-War Transport Aircraft. Tonbridge, UK: Air-Britain. ISBN 0-85130-078-2.
