= Siemens-Schuckert E.I =

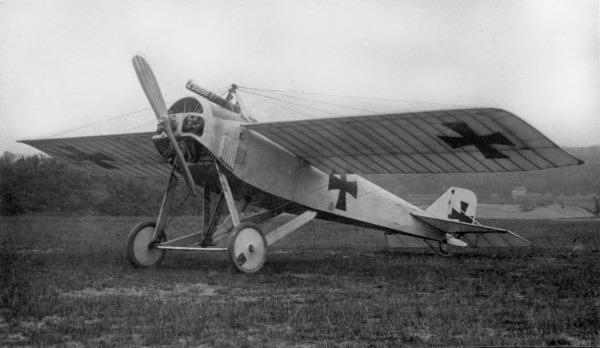

General information
- Type: monoplane fighter
- National origin: German Empire
- Manufacturer: Siemens-Schuckert
- Primary user: Luftstreitkräfte
- Number built: 21 (incl. 1 prototype)

History
- First flight: late 1915

The Siemens-Schuckert E.I was a German fighter aircraft, manufactured by Siemens-Schuckert.

The E type (Eindecker) monoplane first flew in late 1915. it was a monoplane with wire braced wings. powered by the Siemens-Halske Sh.I rotary engine it was armed with a single LMG 08/15 machine gun. After a successful evaluation, 20 production models were built.

== Variants ==
E.II
1 prototype built. Powered by 89 kW (120 hp) Argus As.II inline engine. Destroyed in an accident.
E.III
6 built. Powered by 75 kW (100 hp) Oberursel U.I 9-cylinder rotary engine, a licence built Gnome Delta.
E.IV
Powered by a Siemens-Halske Sh.I. Fuselage circular in cross-section project only.

== Operators ==
German Empire

- Luftstreitkräfte

== Specifications (E.I) ==
Data from German Aircraft of the First World War

General characteristics

- Crew: 1
- Length: 7.1 m (23 ft 3.625 in)
- Wingspan: 10.0 m (32 ft 9.75 in)
- Empty weight: 473 kg (1,041 lb)
- Gross weight: 673 kg (1,481 lb)
- Powerplant: 1 × Siemens-Halske Sh.I , 75 kW (100 hp)

Performance

- Endurance: 1.5 hours

Armament

- 1 × LMG 08/15 machine gun

== Bibliography ==
- Peter Gray and Owen Thetford German Aircraft of the First World War London: Putnam, 1962
