= Sipowicz =

Sipowicz is a Polish surname:

- Czesław Sipowicz
- Kamil Sipowicz
- Andy Sipowicz, a fictional character from the television series NYPD Blue
- Katie Sipowicz, a fictional character from the television series NYPD Blue
