= Sikorsky S-50 =

S-50

General information
- Type: Light observation helicopter
- Manufacturer: Sikorsky

History
- Developed from: Sikorsky R-6

The Sikorsky S-50 was a smaller lighter version of the Sikorsky R-6 designed for the United States Army Air Corps as an observation helicopter with dual controls in 1943. The design emphasized minimal weight and was to be powered by a 150 hp (112 kW) Franklin 6ACV-298 engine turning a three blade main rotor constructed of metal and plywood covered by 2 layers of fabric. The tail rotor also had three blades made from laminated wood. Further weight savings of the design included the rejection of a conventional oleo strut tail wheel in favor of a tail skid on a pivot cushioned by three rubber doughnuts. One full scale wooden mock-up was built but no flying examples were ever produced.

== Specifications ==
Data from Sikorsky Archives

General characteristics

- Crew: 1
- Capacity: 1 pax or 400 lb (180 kg) max payload
- Length: 40 ft 4 in (12.3 m)
- Empty weight: 1,050 lb (476 kg)
- Max takeoff weight: 3,197 lb (1,450 kg)
- Powerplant: 1 × Franklin 6ACV-298 6-cyl. vertically mounted air-cooled horizontally-opposed piston engine, 150 shp (110 kW)
- Main rotor diameter: 29 ft 10 in (9.1 m)
- Main rotor area: 2,801 sq ft (260.2 m^{2}) 3-bladed NACA 0012 composite wood/metal construction with fabric covering

Performance

- Maximum speed: 119 mph (191 km/h, 103 kn)
- Range: 250 mi (400 km, 220 nmi)
- Service ceiling: 16,000 ft (4,900 m)
- Rate of climb: 1,400 ft/min (7.1 m/s)
