= Simonet =

Simonet is a French surname. Notable people with the surname include:

- Denis Simonet (b. 1985), Swiss politician and president of the Pirate Party Switzerland
- Diego Simonet (born 1989), Argentine handball player
- Enrique Simonet (1866–1927), Spanish painter
- François Simonet de Coulmier (1741–1818), also known as Abbé de Coulmier
- Henri Simonet (1931–1996), Belgian politician
- Jacques Simonet (1963–2007), Belgian politician
- Jacques André Simonet (1941-2022), French actor, best known as Jacques Perrin
- Max Simonet, American talk show host of FishCenter Live
- Pablo Simonet (born 1992), Argentine handball player
- Sebastián Simonet (born 1986), Argentine handball player
