= SIAI-Marchetti S.205 =

Single-engine light aircraft

S.205
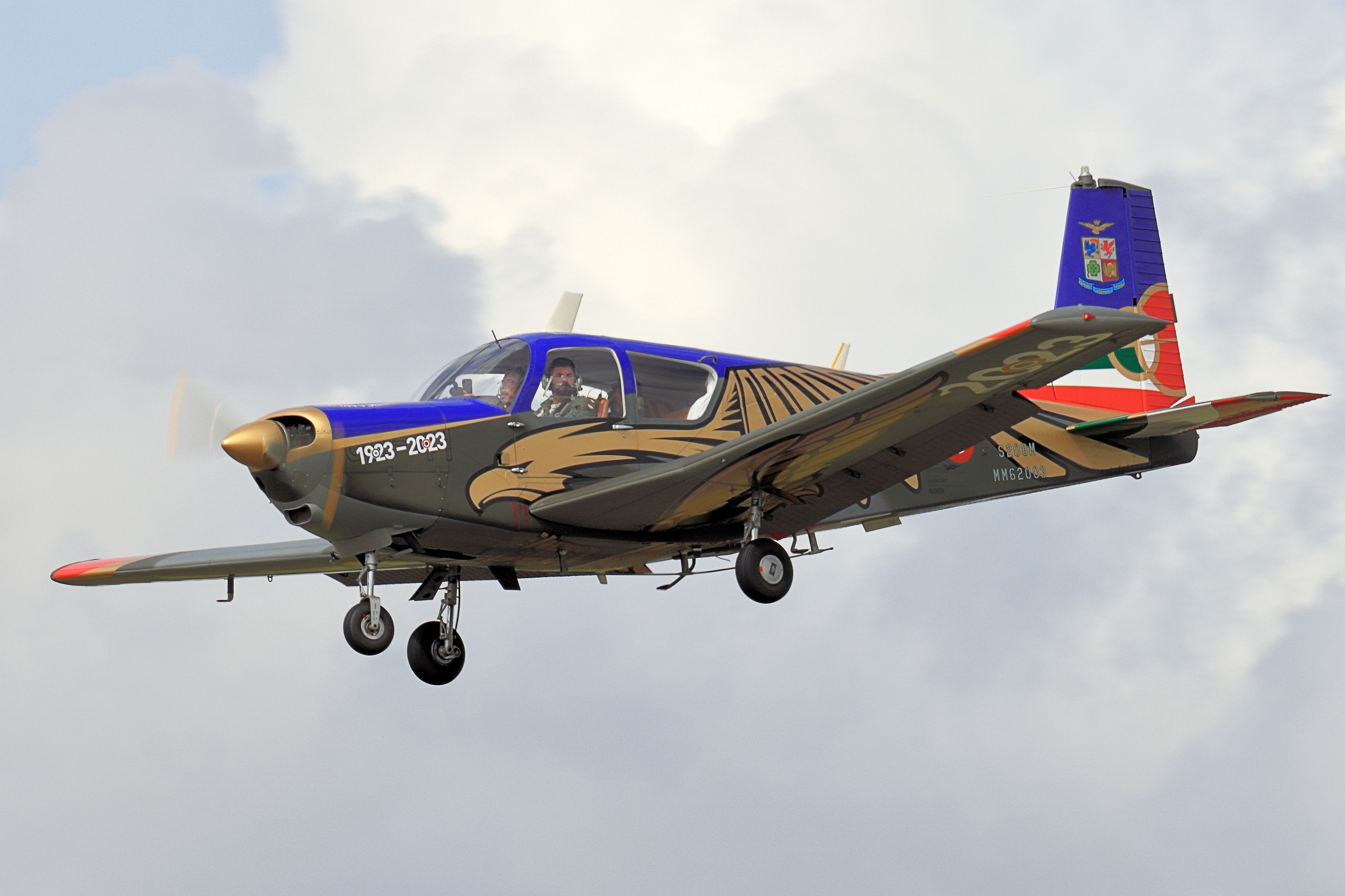
- S.208M of the Italian Air Force

General information
- Type: Liaison and glider-towing aircraft
- Manufacturer: SIAI-Marchetti
- Designer: Alexander Brena
- Status: Out of production In service
- Primary users: Italian Air Force Tunisian Air Force
- Number built: approximately 620 S.205s and 120 S.208s

History
- Manufactured: 1966-1980
- First flight: 1965
- Variant: SIAI-Marchetti S.210

The SIAI-Marchetti S.205 is an Italian four-seat, single-engine, light airplane, manufactured by SIAI-Marchetti. The S.205 made its maiden flight in 1965. The Italian Air Force employs a version called S.208.

== Development ==
The S.205 was the brainchild of the SIAI-Marchetti head designer Alexander Brena in 1964. Brena wanted to make a light, general-purpose aircraft, which led to the S.205. The aircraft was all-metal, low-winged, single-engined and provided space for four persons. Further development led into the S.208, which had a 260 hp engine, retractable landing gear, and 5 seats. Other planned, but never realized versions were the S.206 and S.210.

Approximately 65 fuselages were transported to the United States, to be assembled in Syracuse, New York by the Waco Aircraft Company. With the death of Mr. Berger, the president of the company, the assembly of the S.205 came to a halt in the US.

== Operational history ==
The Italian Air Force acquired 45 aircraft for use as liaison, glider-towing, and training aircraft. The military version, called S.208M, differed from the civil version through its avionics, its two doors for the cockpit, the possibility to mount a hook to tow gliders, and the lack of some fuel tanks. The first 4 delivered aircraft were S.205s, but were later converted into S.208s.

Two aircraft were also sold to Tunisia, who used them for pilot training.

Many S.205 aircraft were purchased by private pilot owners in Europe and elsewhere.

== Variants ==
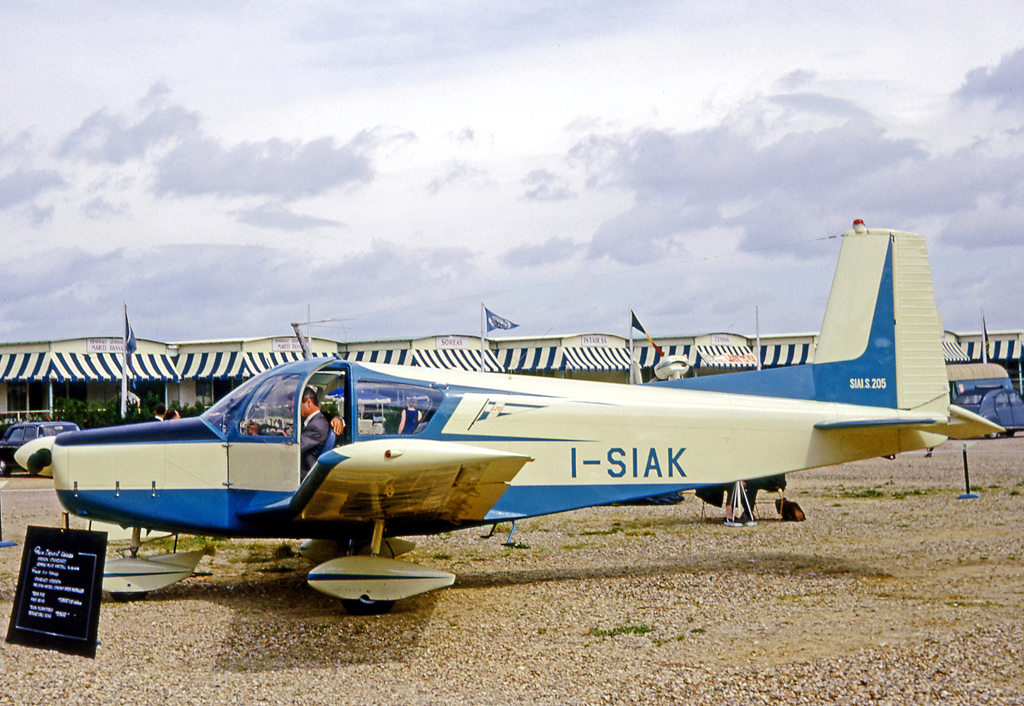
The prototype SIAI S.205 exhibited at the Paris Air Show in June 1965

S.205
basic version, metal, single-engine four-seat airplane, the F version had a fixed undercarriage, while the R version had a retractable undercarriage. It was offered with three different engines:
S.205 F/R-18: Avco Lycoming O-360
S.205 F/R-20: Avco Lycoming IO-360-A1A
S.205 F/R-22: Franklin 6A-350C1
S.206
6-seat version, never realized
S.208
5-seat version with a 260 hp engine and a retractable undercarriage
S.208M
military version for the Italian Air Force
S.208AG
agricultural version, also used as an aviation-ambulance.
S.210
twin-engine version.

== Operators ==
=== Civil ===
The aircraft has been registered in some 27 countries in Europe, Africa, the Americas and Australia.

=== Military ===
Ethiopia

- Ethiopian Air Force

Italy

- Italian Air Force operates 44 SIAI-Marchetti S.208M since 1968

Tunisia

- Tunisian Air Force

== Specifications (S.205-20/R) ==
Data from Jane's All The World's Aircraft 1966–67, Jane's All the World's Aircraft 1971–72

General characteristics

- Crew: 1
- Capacity: 3 pax
- Length: 8 m (26 ft 3 in)
- Wingspan: 10.86 m (35 ft 8 in)
- Height: 2.89 m (9 ft 6 in)
- Wing area: 16.09 m^{2} (173.2 sq ft)
- Aspect ratio: 7.04
- Airfoil: root: NACA 63_{2}618; tip: NACA 63_{2}415
- Empty weight: 740 kg (1,631 lb)
- Max takeoff weight: 1,300 kg (2,866 lb)
- Fuel capacity: 215 L (57 US gal; 47 imp gal) in two wing tanks with optional 115.5 L (30.5 US gal; 25.4 imp gal) wing-tip tanks
- Powerplant: 1 × Avco Lycoming IO-360-A1A 4-cylinder air-cooled horizontally-opposed piston engine, 150 kW (200 hp)
- Propellers: 2-bladed Hartzell constant-speed propeller

Performance

- Maximum speed: 280 km/h (170 mph, 150 kn) at sea level
- Cruise speed: 255 km/h (158 mph, 138 kn) max
- Stall speed: 84 km/h (52 mph, 45 kn) flaps and undercarriage down
- Never exceed speed: 323 km/h (201 mph, 174 kn)
- Range: 1,500 km (930 mi, 810 nmi) max. internal fuel + max. payload
- Ferry range: 2,300 km (1,400 mi, 1,200 nmi) with tip-tanks
- Service ceiling: 5,380 m (17,650 ft)
- Rate of climb: 4.40 m/s; 870 ft/min
- Wing loading: 80.8 kg/m^{2} (16.5 lb/sq ft)
- Power/mass: 0.1148 kW/kg (0.0698 hp/lb)
- Take-off run: 238 m (781 ft)
- Take-off distance to 15 m (49 ft): 408 m (1,339 ft)
- Landing run: 190 m (623 ft)
- Landing distance from 15 m (49 ft): 470 m (1,542 ft)

== See also ==
Related development

- SIAI-Marchetti S.210

Aircraft of comparable role, configuration, and era

- Beechcraft Bonanza
- Cessna 210
- Piper PA-32
