= Marchetti MVT =

Marchetti MVT/SIAI S.50
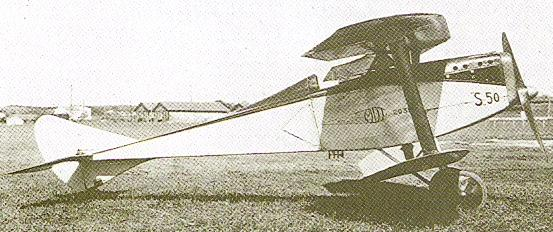
- The Marchetti MVT after its 1922 redesignation as the SIAI S.50.

General information
- Type: Fighter
- National origin: Italy
- Manufacturer: Vickers-Terni and SIAI
- Designer: Alessandro Marchetti (1884-1966)
- Primary user: Corpo Aeronautico Militare Regia Aeronautica (Italian Royal Air Force)
- Number built: 3

History
- First flight: 1919

The Marchetti MVT, later renamed SIAI S.50, was an Italian fighter of 1919 and the early 1920s.

== Design and development ==
Alessandro Marchetti (1884–1966) designed the MVT (for "Marchetti-Vickers-Terni"), a single-seat, all-metal biplane with its fuselage suspended between the upper and lower wings. The after part of the fuselage itself was flattened to serve as an airfoil. The semi-elliptical wings were extremely thin in section and employed wing warping to allow lateral control, and the aircraft had all-moving tail surfaces. The MVT was powered by an SPA 6a water-cooled engine rated at 164 kilowatts (220 horsepower) driving a two-bladed propeller, and was armed with two fixed, forward-firing 7.7 millimeter (0.303-inch) Vickers machine guns synchronized to fire through the propeller.

Vickers-Terni at La Spezia constructed the MVT, which first flew in 1919. On 9 December 1919, it reached a maximum speed of 250 kilometers per hour (155 miles per hour), an unofficial world speed record which was denied official status because no representatives of the Fédération Aéronautique Internationale—the world governing body for aeronautics—were present to certify the speed.

In 1920, Marchetti redesigned the MVT, giving it wings of longer span and splayed interplane bracing struts, a new cabane structure, and a more powerful engine, the SPA 62a rated at 234 kilowatts (285 horsepower). In this redesigned form, the MVT underwent testing at Guidonia Montecelio, where it achieved a speed of 275 kilometers per hour (171 miles per hour).

Marchetti joined the SIAI firm in 1922 as its chief designer, and at that time the MVT was renamed the SIAI S.50. Although the S.50 did not meet the specifications the Regia Aeronautica (Italian Royal Air Force) had established for entrants in the 1923 single-seat fighter contest—which specified that entrants be powered by the 224-kilowatt (300-horsepower) Hispano-Suiza HS 42 eight-cylinder water-cooled engine—SIAI entered it anyway. It met a favorable enough reception for the Regia Aeronautica to acquire three aircraft for evaluation and make plans to order 12 aircraft, although in the end the 12 were never ordered or constructed.

Experience with S.50 in the 1923 contest led Alessandro Marchetti to design and construct a derivative of the S.50, the SIAI S.52 fighter.

== Variants ==
One of the Regia Aeronautica's three S.50s was modified into a twin-float floatplane.

== Operators ==
Kingdom of Italy

- Corpo Aeronautico Militare
- Regia Aeronautica

== Specifications (MVT with SPA 6a engine) ==
Data from Green, William, and Gordon Swanborough The Complete Book of Fighters: An Illustrated Encyclopedia of Every Fighter Aircraft Built and Flown, New York: SMITHMARK Publishers, 1994, ISBN 0-8317-3939-8

General characteristics

- Crew: 1
- Length: 7.75 m (25 ft 5.13 in)
- Wingspan: 8.70 m (28 ft 6.5 in)
- Height: 2.60 m (8 ft 6.33 in)
- Wing area: 21.50 m^{2} (231.43 sq ft)
- Empty weight: 747 kg (1,647 lb)
- Gross weight: 987 kg (2,176 lb)
- Powerplant: 1 × SPA 6A six-cylinder water-cooled piston , 164 kW (220 hp)

Performance

- Maximum speed: 250 km/h (155 mph, 135 kn)
- Endurance: 2 hours 6 minutes

Armament

- 2 × fixed forward-firing synchronized 7.7-millimeter (0.303-inch) Vickers machine guns

Notes:

- Time to 1,000 m (3,281 ft): 2 min
- Time to 5,000 m (16,405 ft): 11 min

== See also ==
- Savoia-Marchetti

Related development

- SIAI S.52
