= Silvercraft SH-4 =

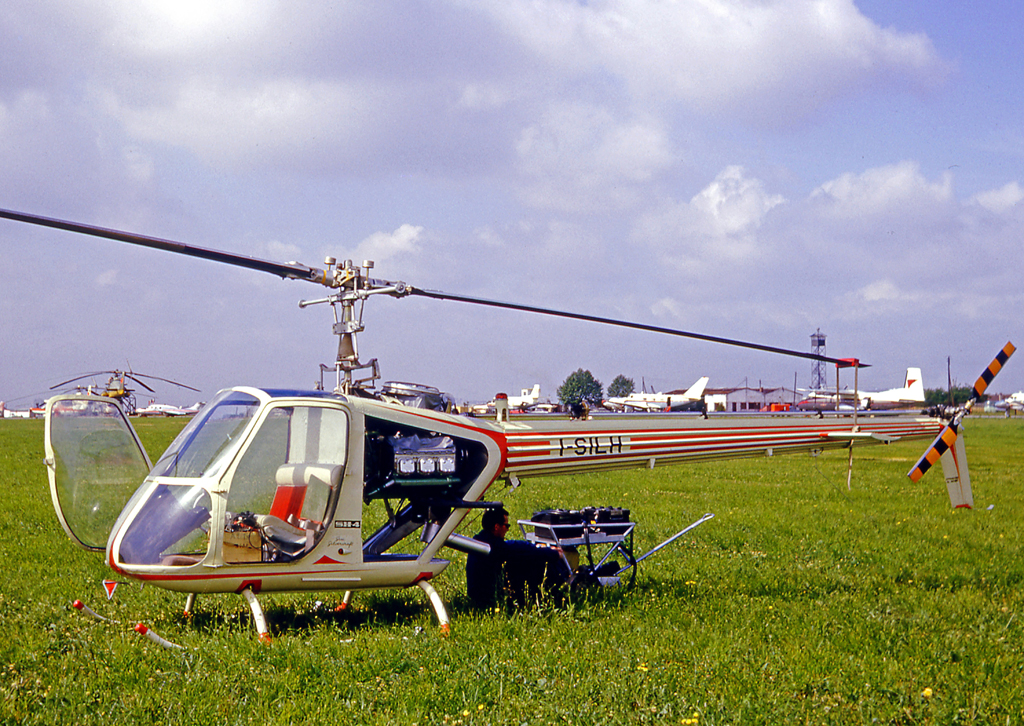
- The first Silvercraft SH-4 exhibited at the Paris Air Salon at Le Bourget airport in June 1965

General information
- Type: Light helicopter
- National origin: Italy
- Manufacturer: Silvercraft SpA
- Number built: 21

History
- First flight: 1963

The Silvercraft SH-4 is an Italian three-seater light helicopter designed and built by Silvercraft SpA.

== Design and production ==
The Silvercraft SH-4 was the first Italian designed helicopter to gain Italian and FAA certification. The prototype was first flown in October 1963 with development assisted with both financial and technical help from SIAI-Marchetti. The helicopter was a conventional design with two-blade main rotor and tail rotor, a skid landing gear and a high-set tubular corrugated tailboom. It is powered by either a 200 hp (149 kW) or 235 hp (175 kW) Franklin 6A-350 engines which have been flat-rated to 170 hp (127 kW). Some SH-4s were equipped with Lycoming LHIO-360-C1A engines of 205 hp (153 kW).

Two aircraft were evaluated by the Italian Air Force.

An upgraded development, the SH-200 was developed from the SH-4 but was only flown as a prototype.

== Operators ==
Italy

- Italian Air Force operated one Silvercraft SH-4 for evaluation test

== Variants ==
SH-4
Standard production variant.
SH-4A
Agricultural variant.
SH-4L
Lycoming powered variant
SH-4T
Turbine powered variant

== Specifications (SH-4) ==
Data from Jane's All The World's Aircraft 1976–77

General characteristics

- Crew: One
- Capacity:
  - Two passengers or
  - 200 L (53 US gal; 44 imp gal) chemicals (crop-spraying version)
- Length: 7.65 m (25 ft 1 in) (fuselage length)
- Height: 2.98 m (9 ft 9 in)
- Empty weight: 518 kg (1,142 lb)
- Max takeoff weight: 862 kg (1,900 lb)
- Fuel capacity: 130 L (34 US gal; 29 imp gal)
- Powerplant: 1 × Franklin 6A-350-D1B air-cooled flat-six engine, 175 kW (235 hp) (derated to 130 kW (170 hp))
- Main rotor diameter: 9.03 m (29 ft 8 in)
- Main rotor area: 64.04 m^{2} (689.3 sq ft)

Performance

- Maximum speed: 161 km/h (100 mph, 87 kn)
- Cruise speed: 117 km/h (73 mph, 63 kn) (econ. cruise)
- Range: 320 km (200 mi, 170 nmi)
- Endurance: 3 hours
- Service ceiling: 4,600 m (15,100 ft)
- Rate of climb: 6.0 m/s (1,180 ft/min)
- Hover ceiling: 3,000 m (9,800 ft) (in ground effect)
