= Siemens-FlyEco Magnus eFusion =

German light aircraft

Magnus eFusion
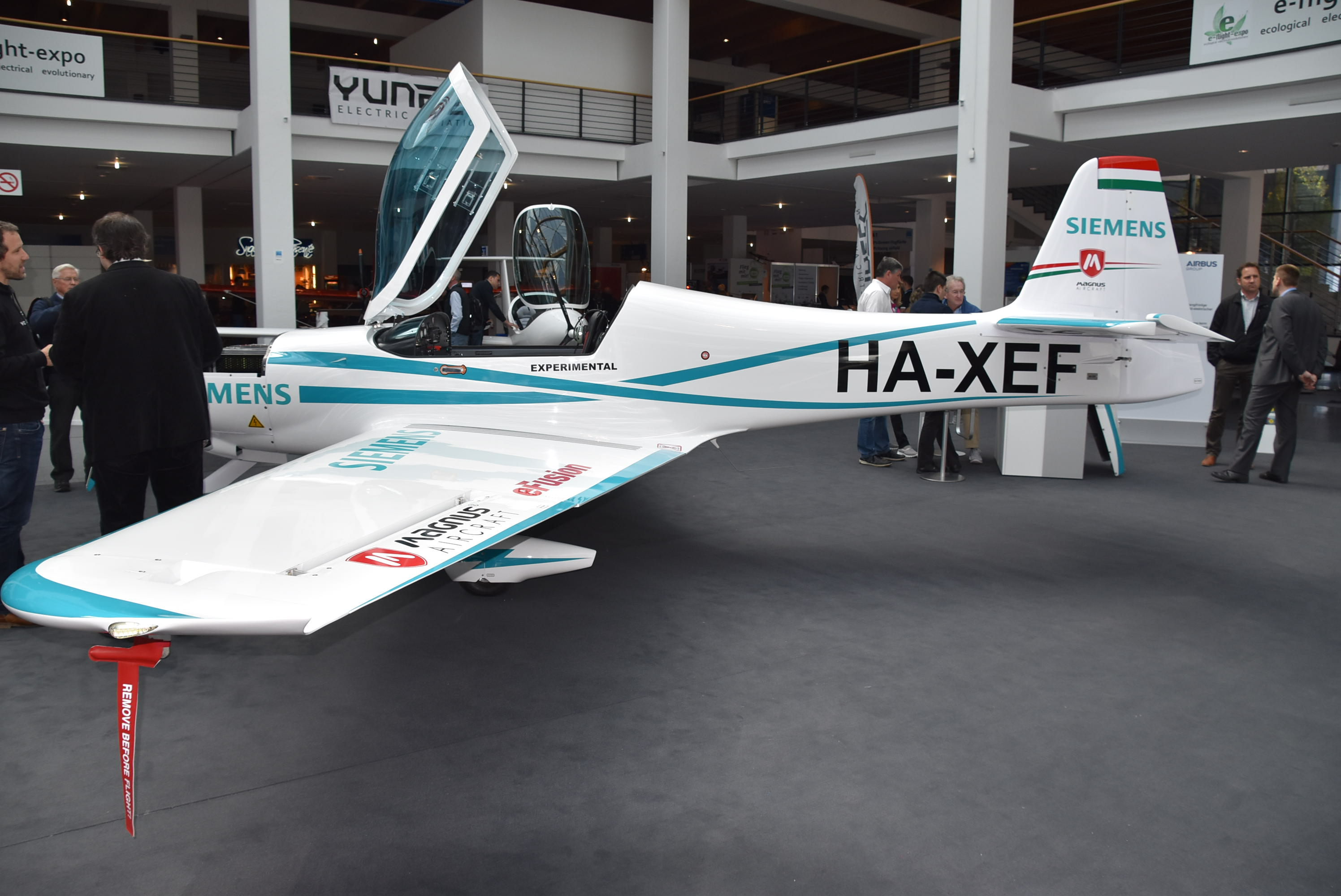

General information
- Type: Hybrid electric aircraft
- National origin: Germany/Hungary
- Manufacturer: Siemens and FlyEco
- Status: Production planned (2018)

History
- First flight: 11 April 2018

The Siemens-FlyEco Magnus eFusion is a German hybrid diesel-electric aircraft that was designed by Siemens and FlyEco, introduced at the AERO Friedrichshafen show in 2018. The aircraft is intended for series production as a ready-to-fly design.

The design was first flown on 11 April 2018 in Hungary. On 31 May 2018, the prototype crashed in Hungary, while on a training flight, killing its two occupants.

== Design and development ==
The aircraft featured a cantilever low-wing, a two-seat side-by-side configuration enclosed cockpit under a bubble canopy, fixed tricycle landing gear, and a single engine in tractor configuration.

The aircraft was made from composites. The power train consisted of a Siemens SP55D electric motor which was intended to be powered by batteries for take-off and landing. A FlyEco three-cylinder diesel engine, derived from a Smart Car engine, with common rail injection and electronic controls, was intended to recharge the batteries in flight for extended range.

== Accidents and incidents ==
The prototype crashed in Hungary on 31 May 2018 killing both occupants. The aircraft was on a training flight at the time. The accident investigation concluded that the crash was most likely due to pilot error in causing a high bank-angle stall close to the ground.

== Specifications (Magnus eFusion) ==
Data from Baker

General characteristics

- Crew: one
- Capacity: one passenger
- Powerplant: 1 × Siemens SP55D electric motor
- Powerplant: 1 × Smart Car three-cylinder automotive conversion diesel engine for battery charging in-flight
- Propellers: 3-bladed composite

== See also ==
- List of electric aircraft
