= Six Chuter =

American powered parachute manufacturer

- Industry: Aerospace
- Founded: 1991
- Founder: Dan Bailey
- Headquarters: Pasco, Washington, United States
- Products: Powered parachutes
- Owner: Caleb Bowman
- Website: www.sixchuter.com

Six Chuter is an American aircraft manufacturer, originally based in Yakima, Washington and founded in 1991. The company specializes in the design and production of powered parachutes. The company was founded as Six Chuter Inc by Dan Bailey.

In 2010 the company was purchased, the name changed to Six Chuter International LLC and relocated to Pangborn Memorial Airport, East Wenatchee, Washington.

In 2019 Six Chuter International was purchased from Tom Connley by Stacey and Anita Eaton. The company was relocated to Toquerville, Utah.

In April of 2022, Six Chuter was purchased from the Eatons by Caleb Bowman and moved back to Pasco, Washington

== Aircraft ==
Summary of aircraft built by Six Chuter
Model name	First flight	Number built	Type
Six Chuter Skye Ryder Aerochute			powered parachute
Six Chuter SR1			powered parachute
Six Chuter SR2			powered parachute
Six Chuter SR5			powered parachute
Six Chuter SR7			powered parachute
Six Chuter Power Hawk			powered parachute
Six Chuter Discovery			powered parachute
Six Chuter Legend P103UL			powered parachute
Six Chuter Legend SE			powered parachute
Six Chuter Legend XL			powered parachute
Six Chuter Legend XL Paragon 912			powered parachute
