= Sikorsky S-68 =

S-68

General information
- Type: Commercial Transport
- National origin: United States
- Manufacturer: Sikorsky Aircraft

The Sikorsky S-68 was a proposed modification of the S-58T turboshaft powered helicopter by moving its engines from the nose to above the cabin similar to the S-61. Doubt about the market potential of the design led to termination of the project before any examples were produced.
