= SIAI S.52 =

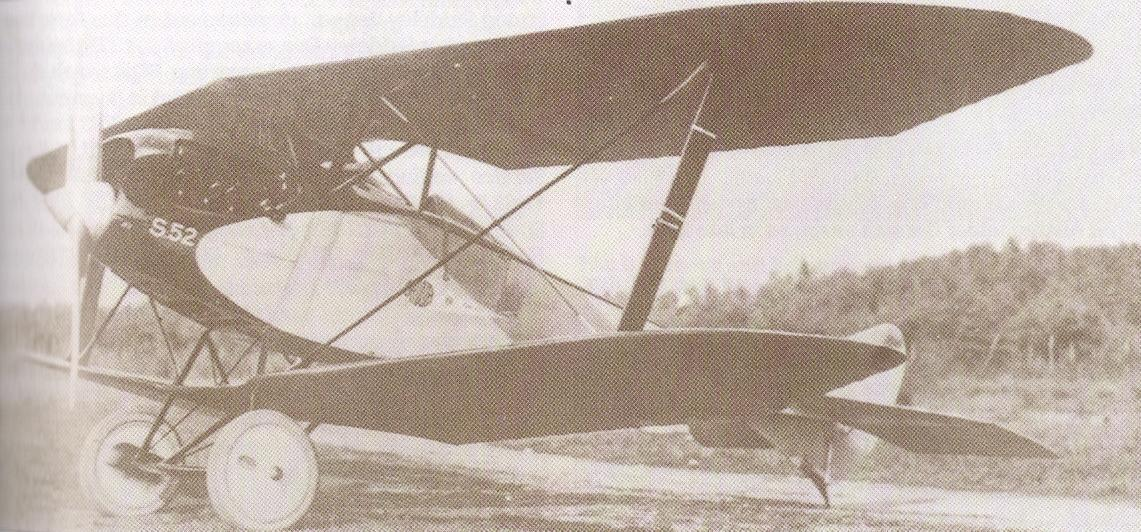

General information
- Type: Fighter
- National origin: Italy
- Manufacturer: SIAI
- Designer: Alessandro Marchetti (1884-1966)
- Primary users: Italy Paraguayan Air Arm
- Number built: 2

History
- First flight: 1924

The SIAI S.52 was an Italian fighter prototype of 1924.

== Design and development ==
In 1919, Alessandro Marchetti (1884–1966) designed the Marchetti MVT fighter, renamed the SIAI S.50 in 1922 when Marchetti joined the SIAI company as its chief designer. SIAI entered the S.50 in the 1923 Regia Aeronautica (Italian Royal Air Force) fighter contest, even though the S.50 was powered by a 212-kilowatt (285-horsepower) SPA 62a six-cylinder engine instead of the 224-kilowatt (300-horsepower) Hispano-Suiza HS 42 eight-cylinder water-cooled engine required by the Italian Air Ministry's specification for entrance in the contest. Despite this, the S.50 attracted enough Regia Aeronautica interest to prompt it to acquire three S.50 fighters from SIAI for evaluation, although a proposal to order twelve S.50 aircraft never bore fruit.

Marchetti decided to design a derivative of the S.50 powered by the HS 42 engine for entry in the 1923 fighter contest. The resulting S.52 was a single-seat, all-metal biplane with its fuselage suspended between the upper and lower wings. The after part of the fuselage itself was flattened to serve as an airfoil. The semi-elliptical wings were extremely thin in section and larger in area than those of the S.50, and used ailerons to allow lateral control rather than the wing warping the S.50 employed. The S.50's all-moving tail surfaces were replaced in the S.52 by a conventional tail unit which combined fixed and moving surfaces. The engine drove a two-bladed propeller, and the S.52 was armed with two fixed, forward-firing 7.7-millimeter (0.303-inch) Vickers machine guns synchronized to fire through the propeller.

== Operational history ==
The S.52 was too late for the 1923 fighter contest, first flying in 1924. Two prototypes – designated MM.3 and MM.4 – were built, but no Italian production order ensued.

In 1925, a proposal was made to re-engine one of the prototypes with a 306-kilowatt (410-horsepower) Fiat A 20 engine, which was projected to give it a top speed of 285 kilometers per hour (177 miles per hour). This conversion never took place.

The other prototype was shipped to Latin America for demonstration flights, one of which was a 1927 flight from Argentina to Paraguay. SIAI had learned that the Paraguayan Air Arm was purchasing airplanes, so the S.52 made a series of successful flights at the Paraguayan Military Aviation School. The Paraguayan government decided to buy it in 1927 – the first fighter Paraguay had ever bought and its only fighter until the arrival of seven Wibault 73 C.1 aircraft in 1928 – but placed no order for additional S.52s.

The Paraguayan S.52 received the serial number 16 in 1932. It apparently took no part in the Chaco War (1932–1935), but saw intensive use as a fighter trainer at Paraguay's Ñu-Guazú Military Aviation School until it was destroyed in an accident on 8 May 1933 at the Ñu-Guazú airfield. Its pilot, Lieutenant Emilio Rocholl, survived the crash.

== Operators ==
Kingdom of Italy

- Regia Aeronautica

Paraguay

- Paraguayan Air Arm

== Specifications ==
Data from Green, William, and Gordon Swanborough The Complete Book of Fighters: An Illustrated Encyclopedia of Every Fighter Aircraft Built and Flown, New York: SMITHMARK Publishers, 1994, ISBN 0-8317-3939-8

General characteristics

- Crew: 1
- Length: 7.18 m (23 ft 6.67 in)
- Wingspan: 10.70 m (35 ft 1.25 in)
- Wing area: 24.00 m^{2} (258.34 sq ft)
- Empty weight: 800 kg (1,764 lb)
- Gross weight: 1,100 kg (2,425 lb)
- Powerplant: 1 × Hispano-Suiza HS 42 eight-cylinder water-cooled piston , 224 kW (300 hp)

Performance

- Maximum speed: 270 km/h (168 mph, 146 kn)
- Endurance: 2 hours 30 minutes

Armament

- 2 × fixed forward-firing synchronized 7.7-millimeter (0.303-inch) Vickers machine guns

Notes:

- Time to 1,000 m (3,281 ft): 1 min 30 sec

== See also ==
- Savoia-Marchetti

Related development

- Marchetti MVT (SIAI S.50)
