= Sikorsky XHJS =

Sikorsky S-53 / XHJS-1
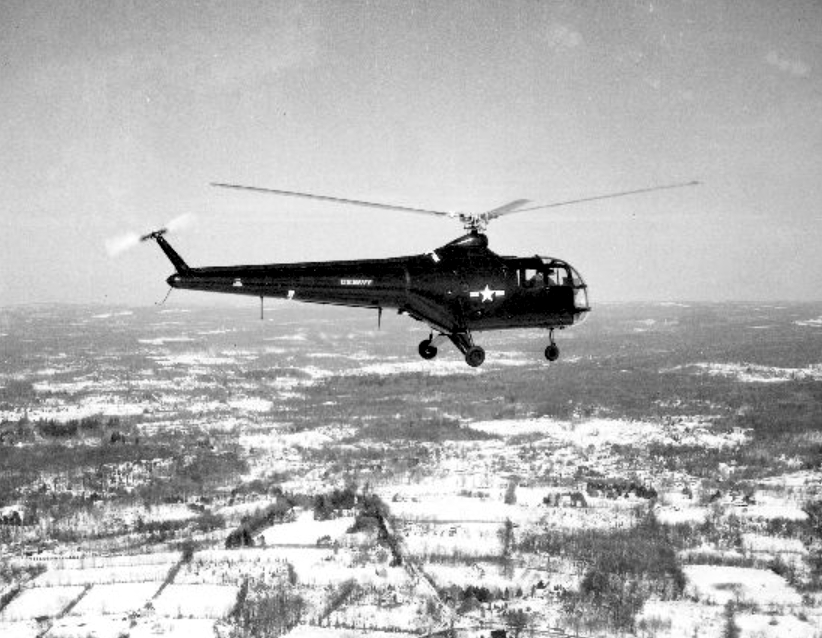

General information
- Type: Helicopter
- National origin: United States
- Manufacturer: Sikorsky Aircraft
- Primary user: United States Navy
- Number built: 2

History
- First flight: 22 September 1947
- Developed from: Sikorsky S-51

The Sikorsky XHJS-1 (manufacturer designation S-53), was developed by Sikorsky Aircraft to meet a Naval requirement for a utility helicopter. The XHJS-1 was not ordered into production and only two prototypes were built.

== Design and development ==
Powered by a 525 hp (391 kW) Continental R-975-34, the S-53 was a development of the S-51 designed for use on aircraft carriers. The tail rotor was raised above head-height to give more clearance and the landing gear was made stronger to enable operations from a moving deck. Other enhancements were a folding main rotor and the option for amphibious landing gear. Two prototypes were ordered by the United States Navy as the XHJS-1 and the first flew on 22 September 1947. The type was evaluated against the Piasecki XHJP-1. With the Piasecki design being ordered as the HUP-1 by the Navy, the S-53 was not developed further.

== Variants ==
XHJS-1
Prototype naval utility helicopter, two built.

== Specifications (XHJS-1) ==
General characteristics

- Crew: one
- Capacity: three
- Powerplant: 1 × Continental R-975-34 , 525 hp (391 kW)
- Main rotor diameter: 49 ft 0 in (14.94 m)

== See also ==
Related development

- Sikorsky S-51

Aircraft of comparable role, configuration, and era

- Piaseckli XHUP-1
