= Sikorsky S-13 and S-14 =

S-13 and S-14

General information
- Type: Experimental
- National origin: Russian Empire
- Manufacturer: Russian Baltic Railroad Car Works
- Designer: Igor Sikorsky

The Sikorsky S-13 and S-14 were proposed aircraft designs that would have been built at the Russian Baltic Railroad Car Works while Igor Sikorsky was the chief engineer of the aircraft manufacturing division. Due to engine availability problems the machines were never completed.
