= Sikorsky Cypher =

Unmanned aerial vehicles developed by Sikorsky Aircraft

Cypher / Cypher II
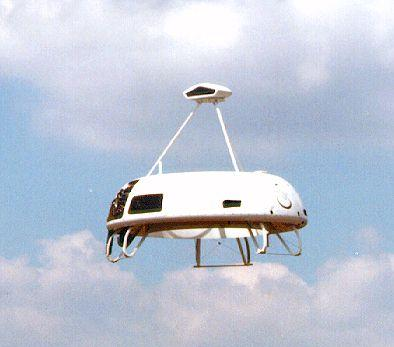
- A Cypher UAV

General information
- Type: Unmanned aerial vehicle
- Manufacturer: Sikorsky Aircraft
- Designer: Sikorsky Aircraft
- Status: Cancelled
- Number built: 2

History
- First flight: 1988

The Sikorsky Cypher and Cypher II are types of unmanned aerial vehicles developed by Sikorsky Aircraft. They are vertical takeoff and landing aircraft which use two opposing rotors enclosed in a circular shroud for propulsion.

== Design and development ==
=== Cypher ===
Sikorsky began work on the Cypher in the late 1980s as a small unmanned aerial vehicle with coaxial rotors enclosed within a torus-shaped shroud. The circular duct improved handling safety and added lift. The first proof-of-concept aircraft measured 1.75 m (5.7 ft) in diameter and 55 cm (1.80 ft) in height, weighed 20 kg (44 lb), and flew in the summer of 1988 powered by a four-stroke 2.85 kW (3.82 hp) engine. For early trials it was mounted on a truck to conduct forward-flight tests.

A larger prototype followed, with a diameter of 1.9 m (6.2 ft), weight of 110 kg (240 lb), and a 40 kW (54 hp) Wankel engine. It achieved its first flight in April 1992 and its first free flight in 1993. Over the remainder of the decade the vehicle accumulated more than 550 demonstration flights for U.S. government agencies.

The Cypher could carry a sensor payload mounted above the fuselage or transport external loads of up to 23 kg (51 lb). The program provided the basis for the follow-on Cypher II, which was submitted to the United States Navy’s VT-UAV competition.

=== Cypher II ===
Sikorsky developed the Cypher II as an enlarged derivative of the original design. Two prototypes were constructed for evaluation by the United States Marine Corps, which designated the type Dragon Warrior. Externally similar in diameter to the first Cypher, the Cypher II incorporated a rear-mounted pusher propeller to improve forward thrust. It could also be fitted with detachable wings to extend endurance

== Specifications (Cypher) ==
General characteristics

- Crew: none
- Capacity: 50 lb (23 kg)
- Length: 6 ft 2 in (1.88 m)
- Wingspan: 4 ft 0 in (1.22 m)
- Height: 2 ft 0 in (0.61 m)
- Wing area: 25.2 sq ft (2.4 m^{2})
- Gross weight: 264 lb (120 kg)
- Max takeoff weight: 300–340 lb (136–154 kg)
- Powerplant: 1 × UAV Engines AR801 Wankel rotary engine, 50 hp (37 kW)

Performance

- Maximum speed: 52 kn (60 mph, 97 km/h)
- Range: 49–67 nmi (56–77 mi, 90–125 km) depending on model
- Endurance: 2-3 hours
- Service ceiling: 8,000 ft (2,440 m)
- Wing loading: 9.9 lb/sq ft (47.5 kg/m^{2})
- Power/mass: 0.2 hp/lb (0.32 kW/kg)

Avionics

- EO, FLIR, small radars, chemical detectors and magnetometers, radio relay, and non-lethal payloads
