= SIPA S.1000 Coccinelle =

S.1000 Coccinelle
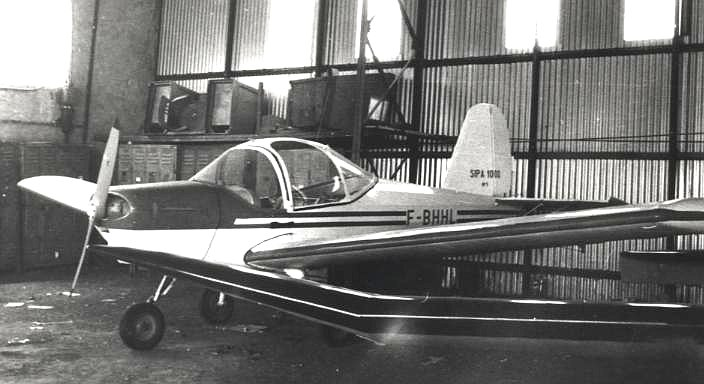
- SIPA S.1000 Coccinelle No. 01, Chavenay airfield, Paris, 1967

General information
- Type: Personal and trainer aircraft
- National origin: France
- Manufacturer: SIPA
- Designer: Yves Gardan
- Primary user: private owners
- Number built: 3

History
- Manufactured: 1955
- Introduction date: 1955
- First flight: 11 June 1955

The SIPA S.1000 Coccinelle was a French-built light civil utility aircraft of the 1950s.

== Design ==
The Coccinelle was designed by Yves Gardan for SIPA as a very low cost all-metal trainer of very simple construction, intended for aero club use. It was a two-seat side-by-side low-winged aircraft with fixed-tricycle undercarriage and incorporated a number of standard automobile parts.

== Production and service ==
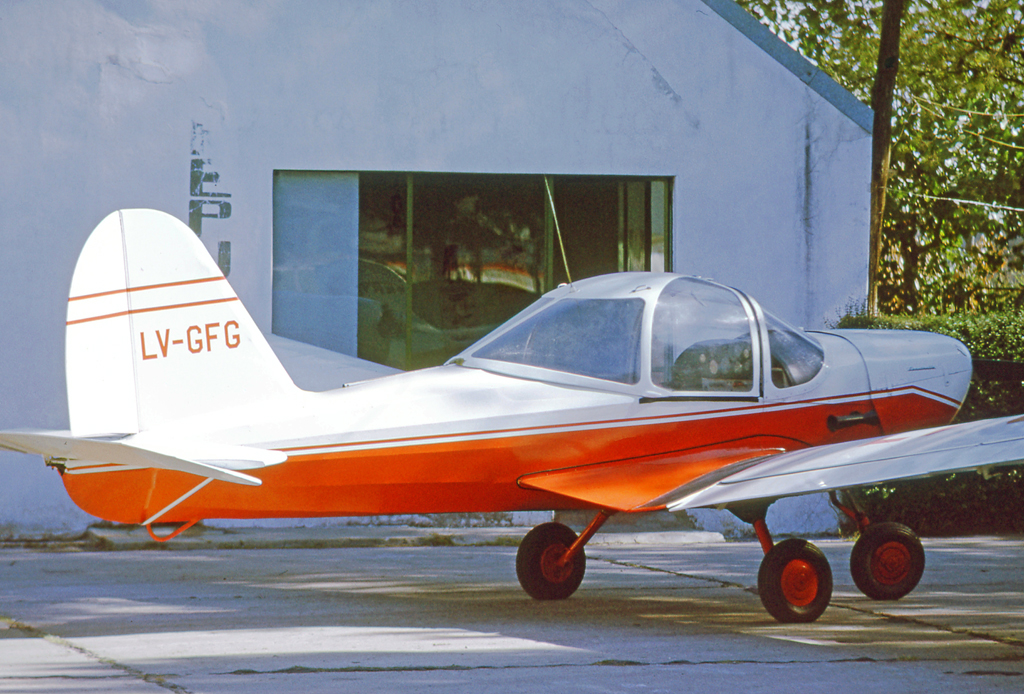
Sipa Coccinelle No. 03 at San Justo airfield near Buenos Aires Argentina in April 1975

The prototype first flew on 11 June 1955. Series production by Société Industrielle pour l'Aéronautique (SIPA) was planned to commence in 1956, but only two further examples were completed with the last being exported to Argentina.

In 2001, the first and third aircraft remained airworthy in France and Argentina, respectively. By 2010 F-BHHL no longer appeared on the French civil register, but in March 2013 LV-GFG remained active in Argentina.

== Specifications (S.1000 Coccinelle) ==
Data from The Aircraft of the World

General characteristics

- Crew: 1
- Capacity: 1 passenger
- Length: 5.44 m (17 ft 10 in)
- Wingspan: 7.9 m (25 ft 11 in)
- Height: 2.19 m (7 ft 2 in)
- Wing area: 9.5 m^{2} (102 sq ft)
- Empty weight: 737 kg (1,625 lb)
- Max takeoff weight: 1,254 kg (2,765 lb)
- Powerplant: 1 × Continental C90-8F 4-cylinder air-cooled horizontally-opposed piston engine, 67 kW (90 hp)
- Propellers: 2-bladed fixed-pitch propeller

Performance

- Maximum speed: 201 km/h (125 mph, 109 kn)
- Cruise speed: 181 km/h (112 mph, 98 kn)
- Range: 608 km (378 mi, 328 nmi) at 172 km/h (107 mph; 93 kn)
- Power/mass: 0.12 kW/kg (0.073 hp/lb)
