= Westerrade =

- Municipality
- Coat of arms

- Location of Westerrade within Segeberg district
- Interactive map of Westerrade
- Location within Germany Location within Schleswig-Holstein
- Coordinates: 53°56′N 10°27′E
- Country: Germany
- State: Schleswig-Holstein
- District: Segeberg
- Municipal assoc.: Trave-Land

Government
  - Mayor: Silke Behrens

Area
  - Total: 5.63 km^{2} (2.17 sq mi)
- Elevation: 38 m (125 ft)

Population (2025-12-31)
  - Total: 456
  - Density: 81.0/km^{2} (210/sq mi)
- Time zone: UTC+01:00 (CET)
  - Summer (DST): UTC+02:00 (CEST)
- Postal codes: 23815
- Dialling codes: 04553
- Vehicle registration: SE
- Website: www.amt-trave- land.de

Westerrade is a municipality in the district of Segeberg, in Schleswig-Holstein, Germany.
