= SIPA S.90 =

French-built two-seat light touring and training aircraft

S.90 series
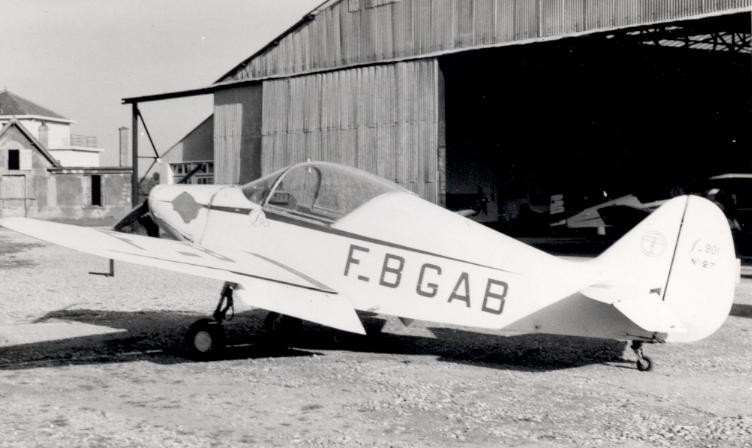
- SIPA S.901 at Berck-sur-Mer in May 1957

General information
- Type: Personal and trainer aircraft
- National origin: France
- Manufacturer: SIPA
- Primary users: private owners French aero clubs
- Number built: 113

History
- Manufactured: 1948 - early 1950s
- Introduction date: 1948
- First flight: 15 May 1947

The SIPA S.90 was a French-built two-seat light touring and training aircraft of the 1940s and 1950s.

== Design ==
The SIPA S.90 was designed by Yves Gardan for the Société Industrielle Pour l’Aéronautique (SIPA). The prototype first flew on 15 May 1947, winning a French government competition for a new light two-seat aircraft for operation by the French aero clubs.

The initial production S.90 was a low-wing aircraft with fixed tailwheel undercarriage and side-by-side seating for two. It was powered by a 75 hp (56 kW) Mathis G4F engine. Four examples were built.

== Production and service ==
100 aircraft were ordered by the French government, on behalf of the aeroclubs, and these were powered by the 75 hp (56 kW) Minie 4DC engine as the SIPA S.901. The first made its initial flight on 25 June 1948. Deliveries were completed in the early 1950s. Various engines were later installed in the S.901, giving rise to new model numbers.

In later years, the S.90 series readily found buyers in the secondhand market and examples have flown with private owners in Belgium, Germany, Switzerland and the United Kingdom. Nine further aircraft were built later with plywood covering in lieu of fabric, receiving new designations. In 2001, 15 examples remained airworthy in France, Switzerland and the UK.

Total production of all models was 113 aircraft.

== Variants ==
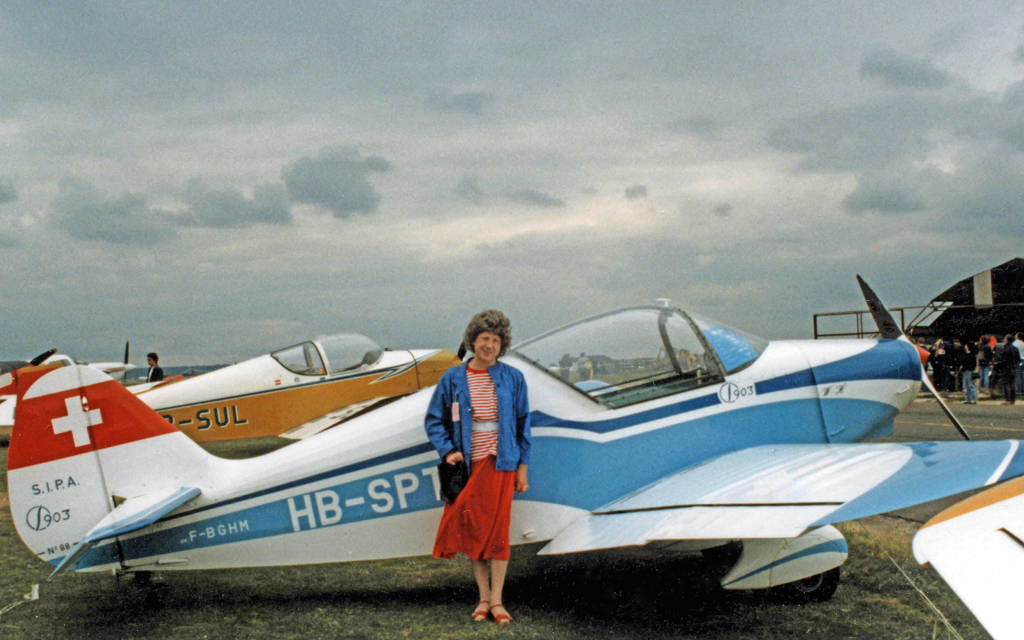
A SIPA S.903 in 1989; this Swiss-registered variant was powered by the 90 hp (67 kW) Continental C90 engine

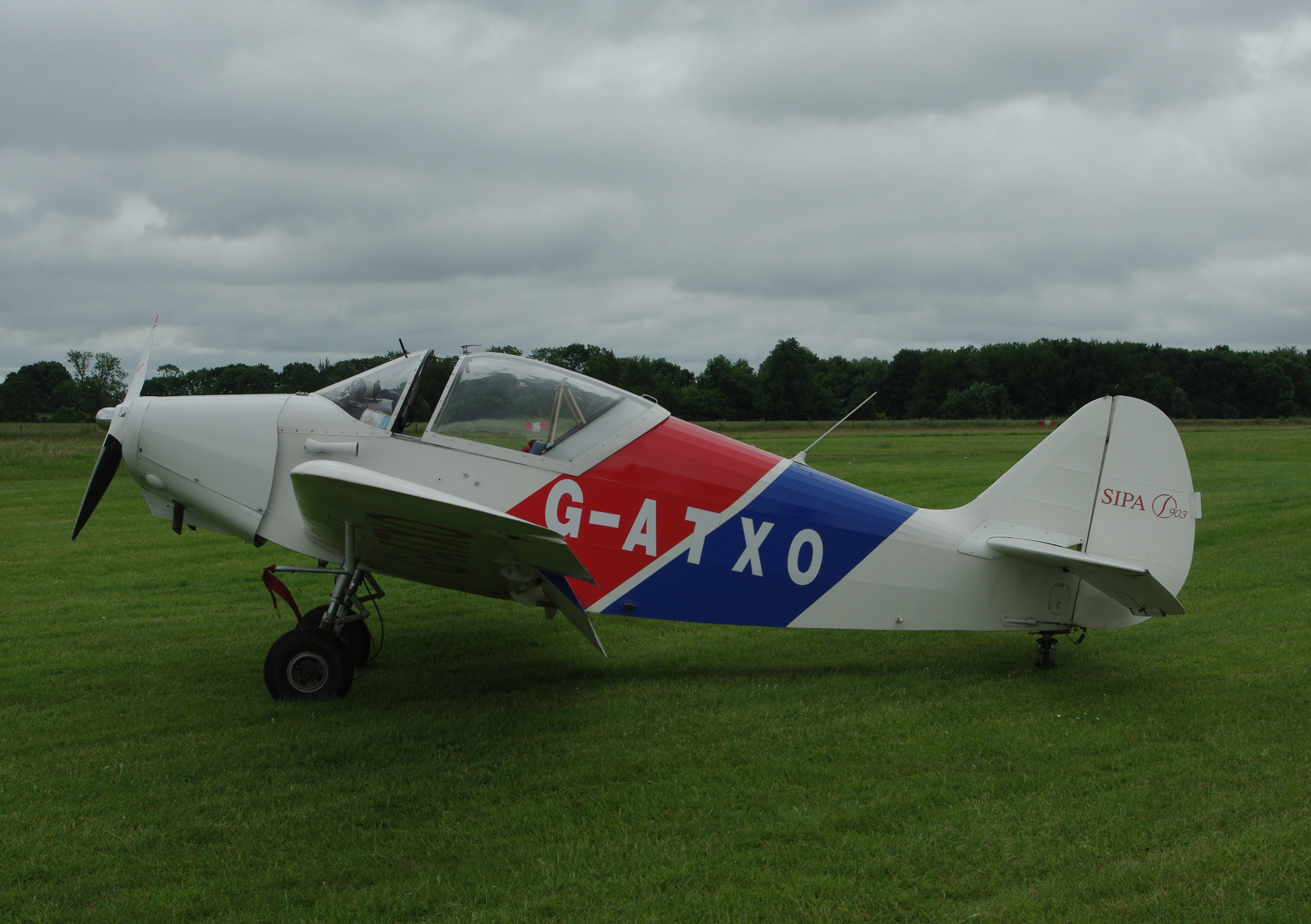
SIPA 903 at Old Warden, June 2014

The following variants were produced:

S.90
4 aircraft with 75 hp (56 kW) Mathis G4F engine
S.901
100 aircraft with 75 hp (56 kW) Minié 4.DC.32 engine. Most were re-engined as follows.
S.902
S.901 with 85 hp (63 kW) Continental C85-12F engine
S.903
S.901 with 90 hp (67 kW) Continental C90-14F engine
S.904
S.901 with 75 hp (56 kW) Salmson 5AQ-01 engine
S.91
2 new aircraft as S.902 but with plywood-covered fuselage and wings
S.92
1 new aircraft as S.91 with 85 hp (63 kW) Mathis 4GB-62 engine
S.93
1 new aircraft as S.91 with 75 hp (56 kW) Salmson 5AQ-01 engine
S.94
5 new aircraft as S.91 with 90 hp (67 kW) Continental C90-8F engine

== Specifications (SIPA S.902) ==
Data from Airlife's World Aircraft

General characteristics

- Crew: 1
- Capacity: 1 passenger or a payload of 234 kg (516 lb)
- Length: 5.74 m (18 ft 10 in)
- Wingspan: 8.74 m (28 ft 8 in)
- Height: 1.75 m (5 ft 9 in)
- Empty weight: 366 kg (807 lb)
- Gross weight: 600 kg (1,323 lb)
- Powerplant: 1 × Continental C85-12F 4-cylinder air-cooled horizontally-opposed piston engine, 64 kW (86 hp)
- Propellers: 2-bladed fixed-pitch propeller

Performance

- Maximum speed: 217 km/h (135 mph, 117 kn)
- Cruise speed: 194 km/h (121 mph, 105 kn)
- Range: 510 km (320 mi, 280 nmi)
- Power/mass: 0.11 kW/kg (0.067 hp/lb)
