= Société Industrielle pour l'Aéronautique =

French aircraft manufacturer (1938-1975)

Société Industrielle pour l’Aéronautique (SIPA)
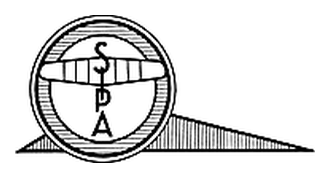
- Industry: Aerospace
- Founded: 1938 in France
- Founder: Georges Volland
- Defunct: 1975
- Successor: Aérospatiale
- Headquarters: Suresnes, France

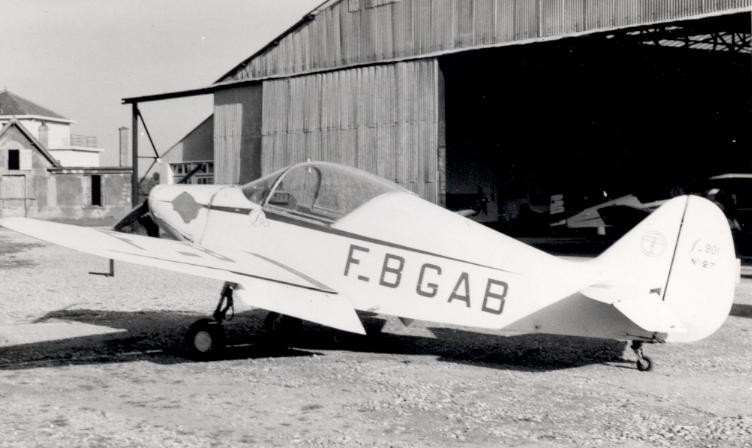
SIPA S.901 at Berck-sur-Mer in May 1957

Société Industrielle pour l’Aéronautique (SIPA) was a French aircraft manufacturer established in 1938 by Georges Volland. From 1938-1940, SIPA principally manufactured parts for other French aircraft companies. After World War II, it began developing a series of trainers for the French Air Force.

In 1947, SIPA won a competition for a new two-seat touring and trainer aircraft for France's aero clubs and 113 were produced as the SIPA S.90 series. The SIPA S.1000 Coccinelle was built in small numbers in 1956/57. The SIPA S.200 Minijet, first flown in 1952, was the world's first all-metal two-seat light jet.

By 1963 the company had been renamed to Société Nouvelle Industrielle pour l'Aéronautique. It was taken over by Aérospatiale in 1975.

== Aircraft ==
- SIPA S.10
- SIPA S.11
- SIPA S.12
- SIPA S.20
- SIPA S.50
- SIPA S.70
- SIPA S.90
- SIPA S.121
- SIPA S.200 Minijet
- SIPA S.251 Antilope
- SIPA S.261 Anjou
- SIPA S.300
- SIPA S.1000 Coccinelle
- SIPA S.1100
