= Hamilton Glasair =

Glasair
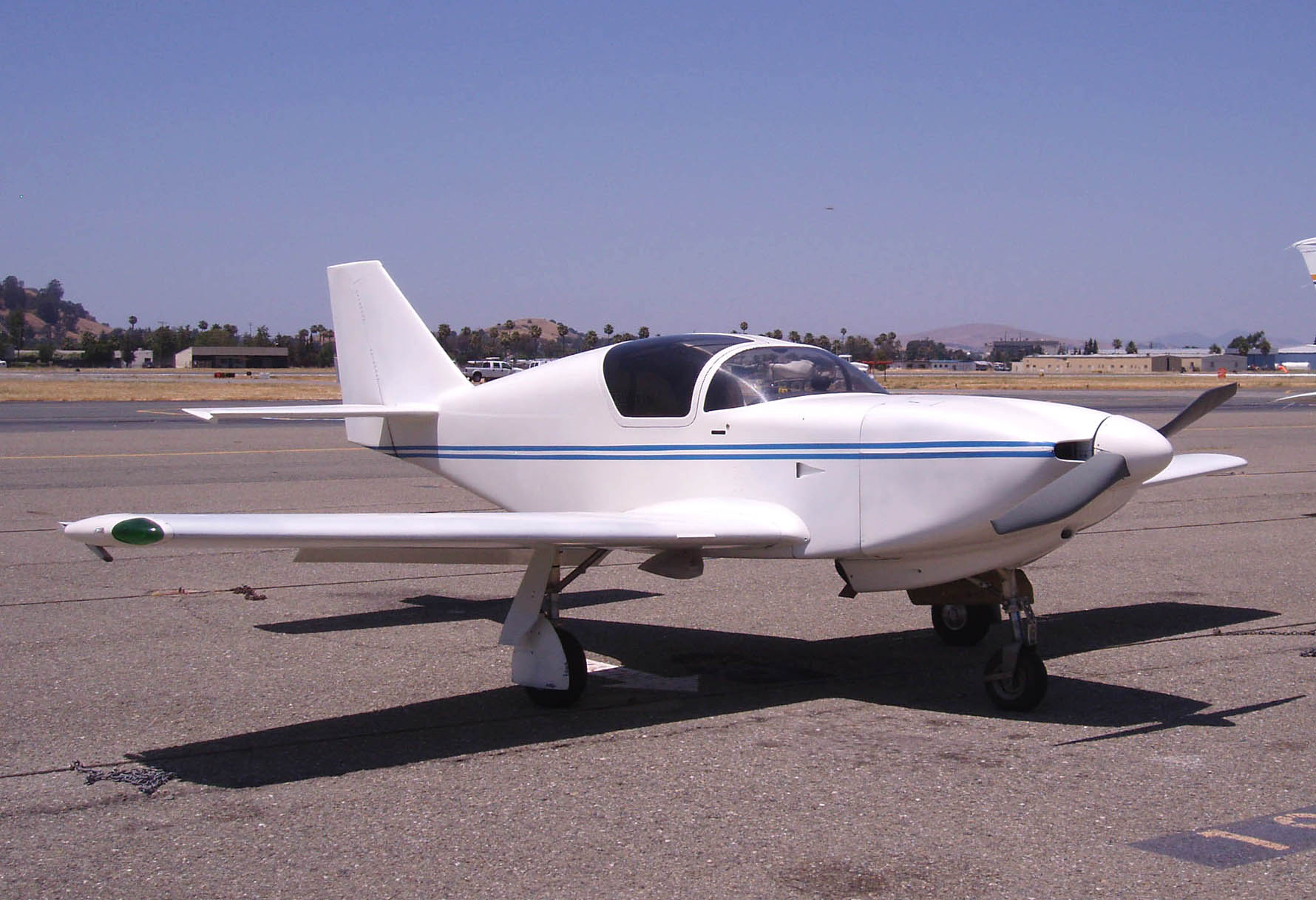
- Glasair 1RG, production model based on prototype SH-1

General information
- Type: Homebuilt aircraft
- National origin: United States
- Designer: Tom Hamilton
- Number built: 1

History
- Introduction date: 1975

The SH-1 tandem Glasair was an original homebuilt aircraft design by Tom Hamilton, who would use the lessons learned from this to build the Glasair I, II and III series of homebuilt aircraft.

== Design ==
The Glasair was an all composite, low-wing tandem seat aircraft with conventional landing gear. The design was wind-tunnel tested prior to construction. The design was modified to a tricycle gear arrangement after visibility problems from the rear seat were noted on solo test flights. The design flew only three times. Hamilton's partner Ted Setzer burned the prototype before moving on to the next design.

== Specifications (Glasair) ==
Data from Sport Aviation

General characteristics

- Crew: one
- Capacity: one passenger
- Powerplant: 1 × Lycoming O-235 horizontally opposed piston aircraft engine, 108 hp (81 kW)
- Propellers: two-bladed

== See also ==
- Glasair I
- Glasair Aviation
- Stoddard-Hamilton Aircraft
