= Glasair GlaStar =

American homebuilt airplane

GlaStar
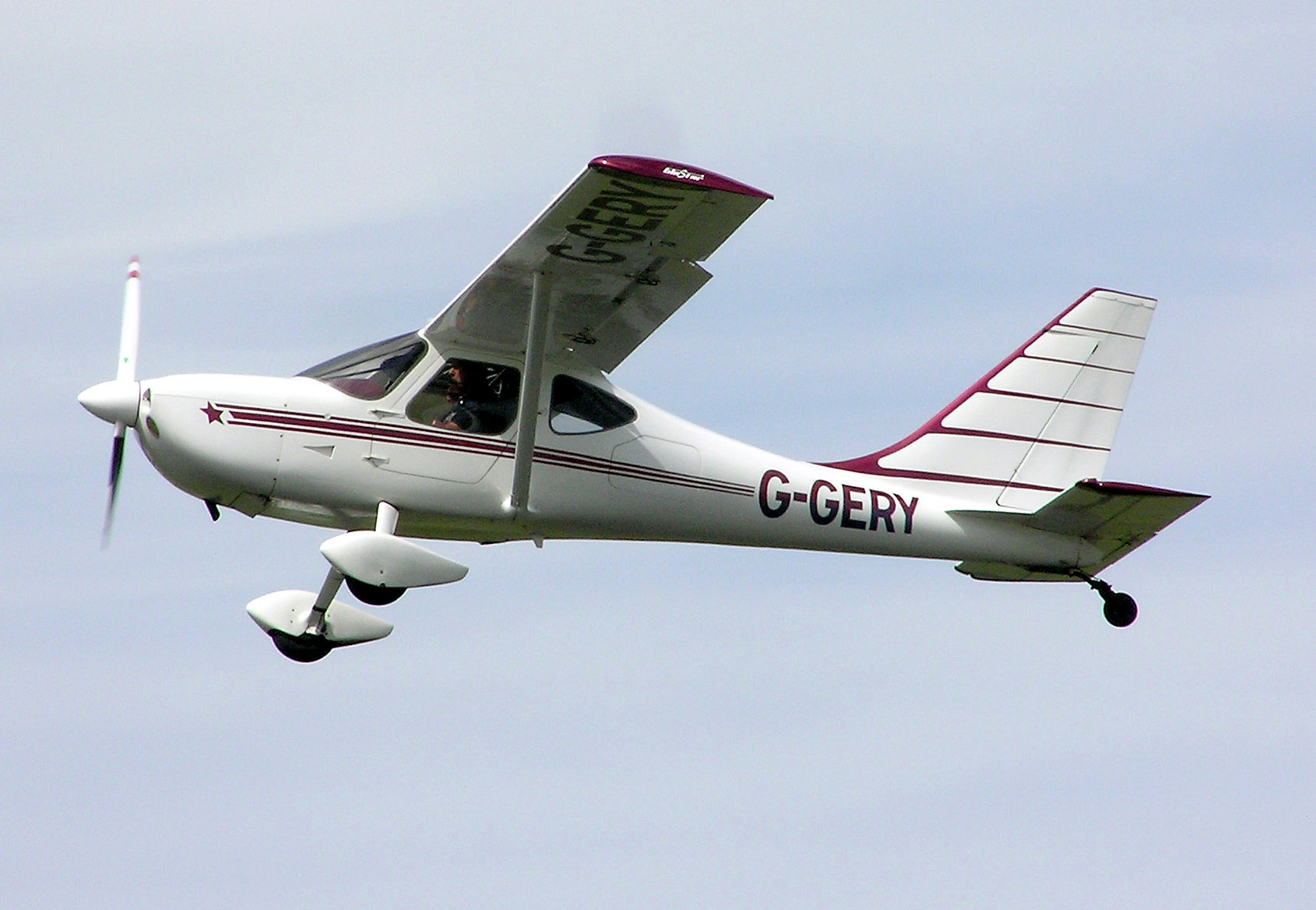
- GlaStar

General information
- Type: Amateur-built aircraft
- National origin: United States
- Manufacturer: Stoddard-Hamilton Aircraft; Glasair Aviation
- Designer: Tom Hamilton
- Status: Production completed circa 2005
- Number built: 300 (2004)

History
- First flight: 1994
- Variants: Symphony SA-160; Glasair Sportsman 2+2; Plane Driven PD-1

The Glasair GlaStar (sometimes Glastar) is an American amateur-built aircraft that was designed by Tom Hamilton and produced by Stoddard-Hamilton Aircraft and later Glasair Aviation. It was first flown in 1994 and was superseded in production by the Glasair Sportsman 2+2 c. 2005. When it was available the aircraft was supplied as a kit for amateur construction.

== Design and development ==
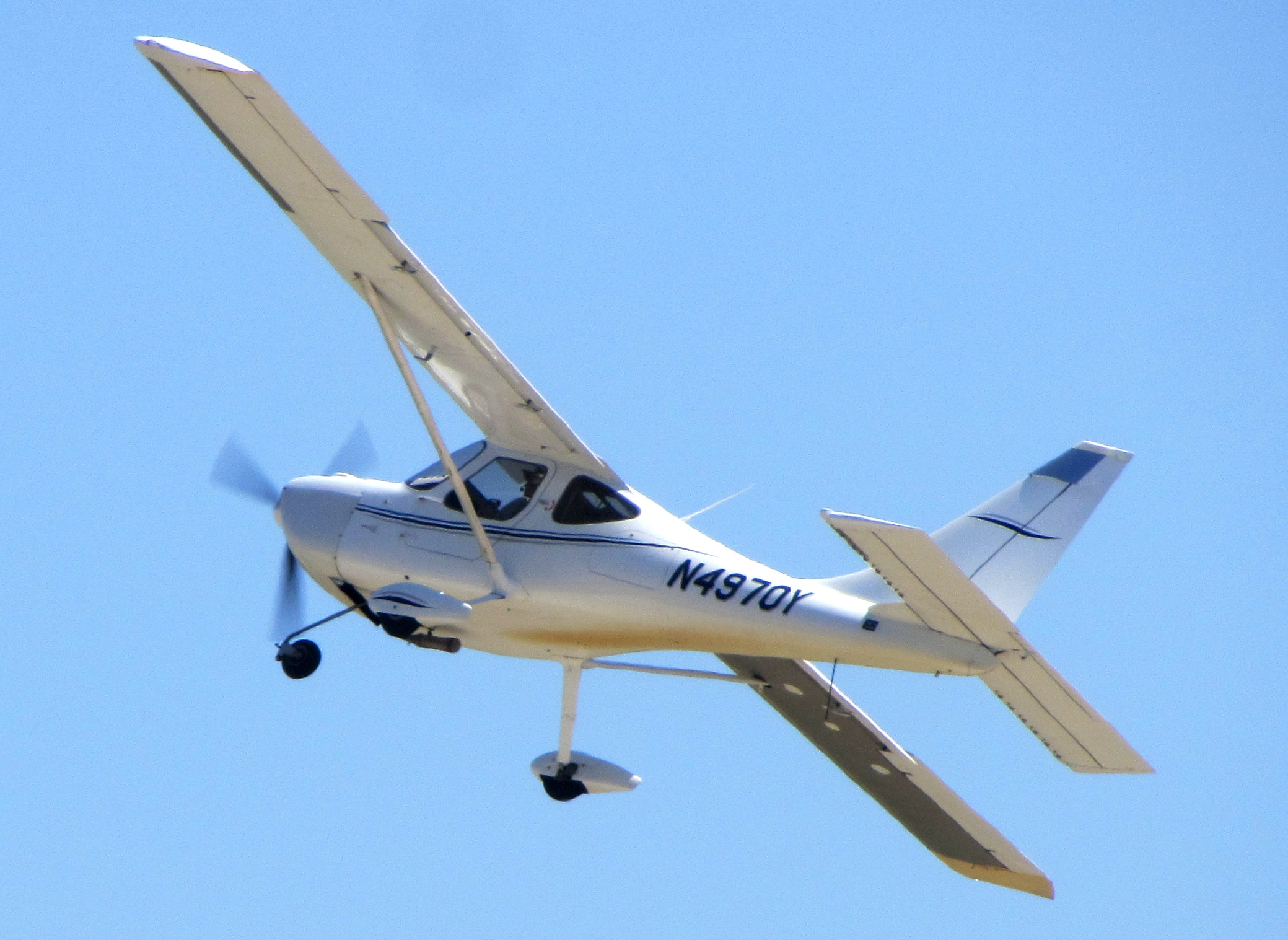
GlaStar

The GlaStar features a strut-braced high-wing, a two-seats-in-side-by-side configuration enclosed cockpit accessed via doors, fixed tricycle landing gear or conventional landing gear and a single engine in tractor configuration.

The aircraft is made with a welded steel fuselage, with a fiberglass covering and aluminum wings. Its 35 ft (10.7 m) span wing employs a NASA GA(W)-2 airfoil at the wing root, with a NASA GA(W)-2 mod at the wing tip. The wings have an area of 128 sq ft (11.9 m^{2}), mount flaps and can be folded for ground transportation or storage. The acceptable power range is 100 to 180 hp (75 to 134 kW) and early engines used included the 100 hp (75 kW) Rotax 912ULS. The aircraft proved underpowered with the Rotax, and later the 150 to 160 hp (112 to 119 kW) Lycoming O-320 and the 180 hp (134 kW) Lycoming O-360 four-stroke powerplants were used. The landing gear can be rapidly converted between tricycle and taildragger configurations. The cockpit is 44 in (110 cm) wide and includes a large baggage area that will accommodate 200 lb (91 kg) of cargo.

Initial factory estimated construction time was 1200 hours.

== Accidents and incidents ==
In 1996, a service recall was issued for the control yoke assembly of select GlaStar kits. In 1999, one of the GlaStar kits not included in the recall crashed, killing its two occupants.

== Variants ==
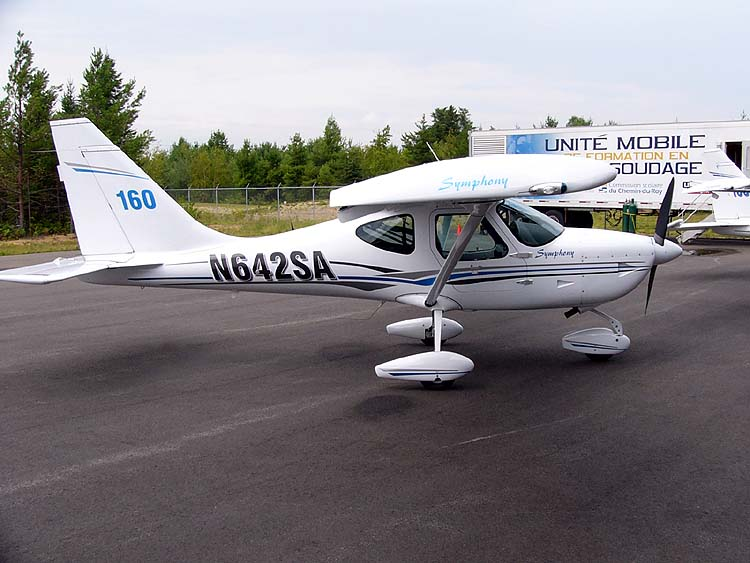
Symphony SA-160

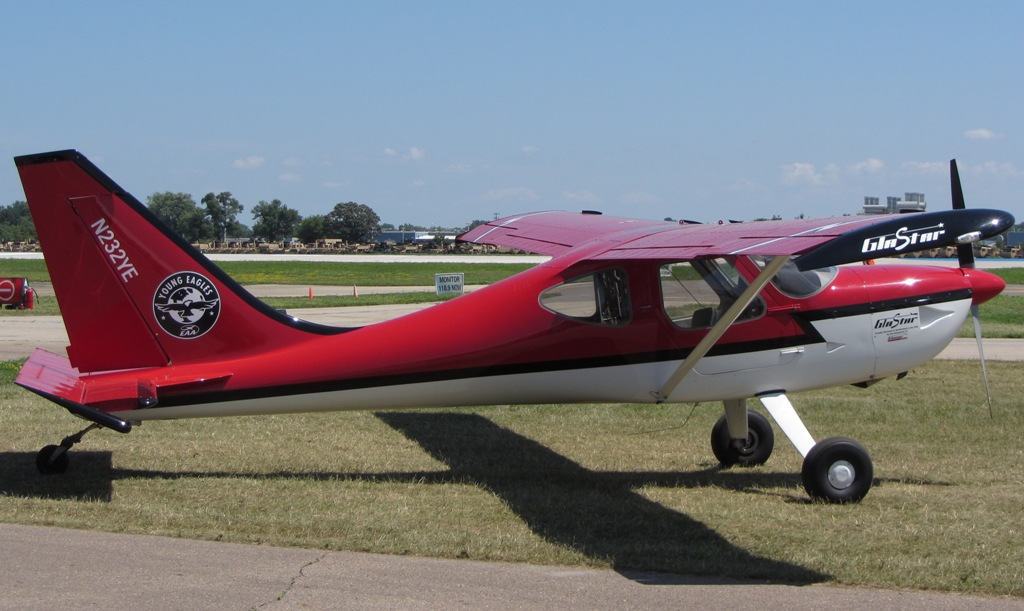
Glasair Sportsman 2+2

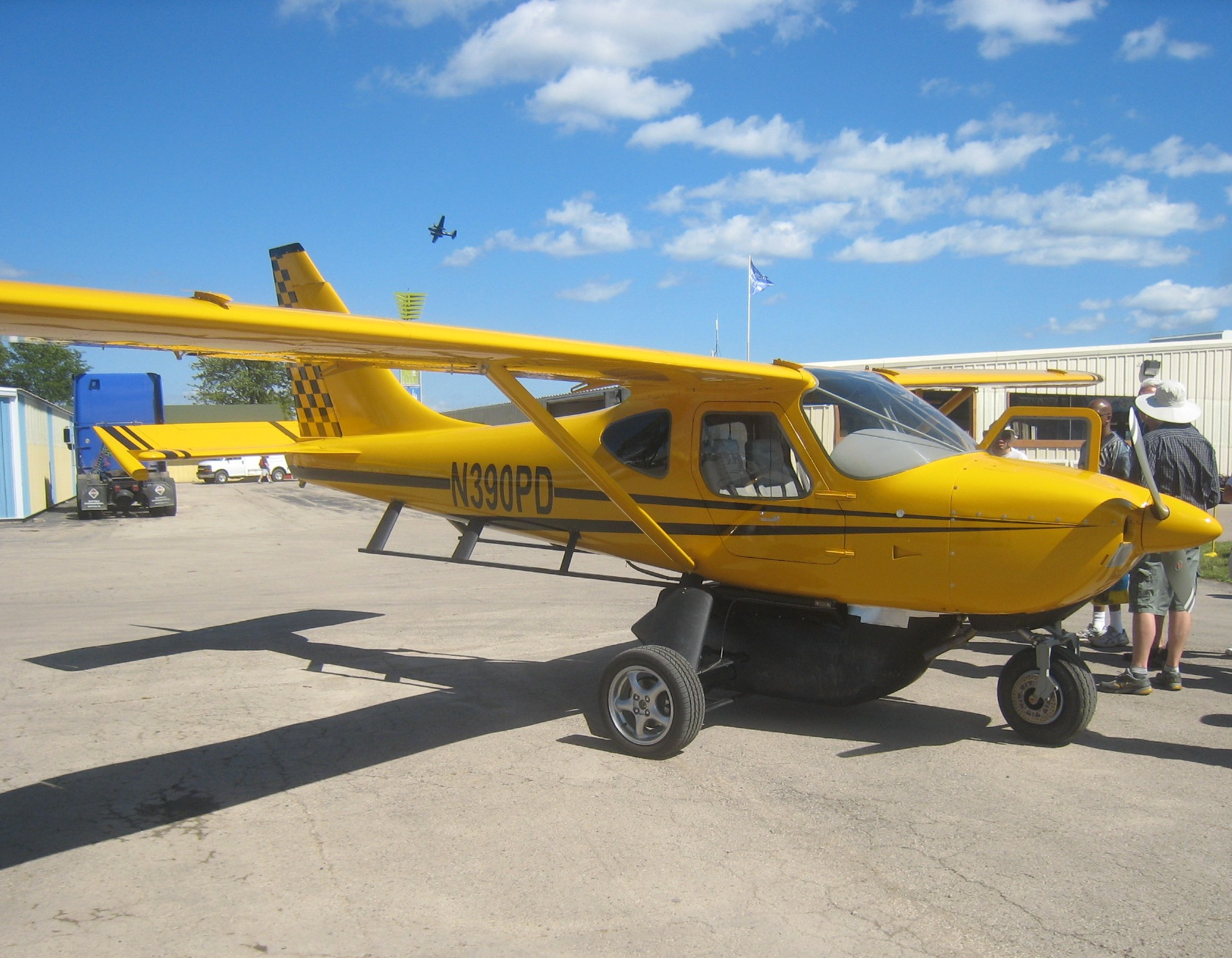
Plane Driven PD-1

Symphony SA-160
Type certified version, produced by Ostmecklenburgische Flugzeugbau (OMF) and later Symphony Aircraft.
Glasair Sportsman 2+2
Four seat development with a gross weight of 2,350 lb (1,066 kg) that replaced the original GlaStar in production.
Plane Driven PD-1
Roadable version produced by Plane Driven.

== Specifications (GlaStar) ==
Data from Bertrand and Kitplanes

General characteristics

- Crew: one
- Capacity: one passenger
- Length: 22 ft 0 in (6.71 m)
- Wingspan: 35 ft 0 in (10.67 m)
- Height: 7 ft 0 in (2.13 m)
- Wing area: 128 sq ft (11.9 m^{2})
- Airfoil: Root: NASA GA(W)-2 airfoil, tip: NASA GA(W)-2 mod
- Empty weight: 1,200 lb (544 kg)
- Gross weight: 1,960 lb (889 kg)
- Fuel capacity: 50 U.S. gallons (190 L; 42 imp gal)
- Powerplant: 1 × Lycoming O-320 four cylinder, air-cooled, four stroke aircraft engine, 160 hp (120 kW)

Performance

- Maximum speed: 170 mph (270 km/h, 150 kn)
- Cruise speed: 167 mph (269 km/h, 145 kn)
- Stall speed: 45 mph (72 km/h, 39 kn)
- Range: 1,440 mi (2,320 km, 1,250 nmi)
- Service ceiling: 20,000 ft (6,100 m)
- Rate of climb: 2,075 ft/min (10.54 m/s)
- Wing loading: 15.3 lb/sq ft (75 kg/m^{2})
