= Vicki Cruse =

American aerobatic pilot

- Aviation career
- Famous flights: 2007 U.S. National Aerobatic Champion
- Flight license: Private Pilot 1993 Emergency Maneuver Training 1996

Racing career
- Best position: Reno Air Races 2003 Sport Class 1st Heat 3B, 2nd Sport Heat 1b & 2b, 3rd Silver Race, 2006 5th Bronze Race
- Aircraft: Zivko Edge 540 N111CD, Glasair III "Cruse Missile" N313CH

Vicki Cruse (December 13, 1967 – August 22, 2009) was an American aerobatic pilot and administrator. She won the U.S. national unlimited aerobatic title in 2007 out of a field of 101 participants. It was only the fourth time that a woman had become the national champion.

Cruse was born in Springfield, Missouri and moved to Florida for college and graduate school. After completing her graduate studies in 1993, she rewarded herself with a private pilots license. It was only until she completed an Emergency Maneuver Training course in 1997 when she felt comfortable to fly solo. She joined the International Aerobatic Club in 1995 and became its president in 2005. She was also an Experimental Aircraft Association (EAA) director and board member. Cruse first earned a spot on the U.S. World Aerobatic Team in 2002.

In addition to aerobatic flying, Cruse was an air racer. She was first woman to have raced in the Sport Class at the Reno Air Races, reaching up to 254 mph in her custom Glasair III "Cruse Missile". In 2008, she was shortlisted as one of the all-female slate of candidates in the Fossett LSR land speed record bid.

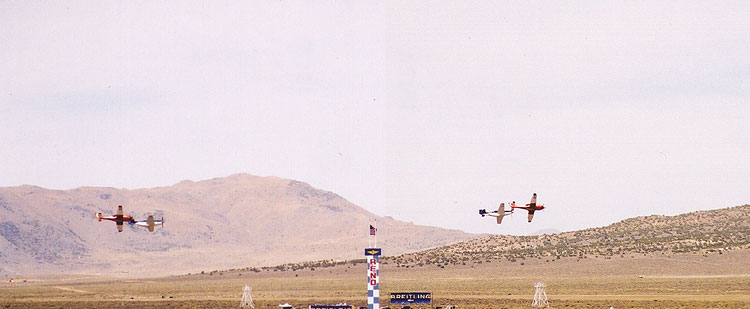
The 2003 Sport Class at the Reno Air Races which Vicki competed in.

== Aerobatic titles and honors ==
- 1998 U.S. National Champion, Sportsman
- 2000 Championship of the Americas Intermediate IAC Champion
- 2005 - 2007 Women’s National Champion
- 2007 U.S. National Aerobatic Championship, Unlimited
- 2007 World Aerobatic Championships, Women's Team Silver medalist
- 10 IAC Achievement Awards

== Accident and aftermath ==
Cruse died on August 22, 2009, when her light plane, a borrowed Zivko Edge 540, registration N540BW, crashed at the Silverstone Motor Race Circuit, Northamptonshire, England, during a qualifying flight for the World Aerobatic Championships. Cruse was 5'2'' tall and fitted pedal extensions on the borrowed aircraft. In practice before the accident, Cruse had experienced a problem carrying out a snap roll, deforming the right footplate. In response, the team engineer prepared a new set of stiffer footplates, but had not fitted these to the aircraft at the time of the accident.

Cruse was the fifth pilot to fly that morning, beginning the flight at 1048 hrs. She flew the first five maneuvers of her routine as practice without issue before signaling to the judges she would begin her competition flight. She proceeded through her first four maneuvers once more, and the accident occurred as she began the fifth maneuver of the routine.

According to witnesses, having completed a vertical climb, she had pushed the nose over at the top in order to descend vertically. She then performed a one and one-quarter snap roll. The objective was to stop rotation after the aircraft has rolled one and one-quarter times, but rotation in this case only slowed, continuing to the ground. She was pronounced dead at the scene.

The accident investigation concluded that the rudder pedal extensions could have contributed to a rudder control restriction, but that pilot incapacitation was also considered a possible contributory factor. Post accident investigations of the pedal extensions found that the force applied by a foot could potentially create a movement that would push the attachment outwards along the pivot tubes, rather than applying it directly to the pedal itself. There was no evidence of drugs or alcohol in her body.

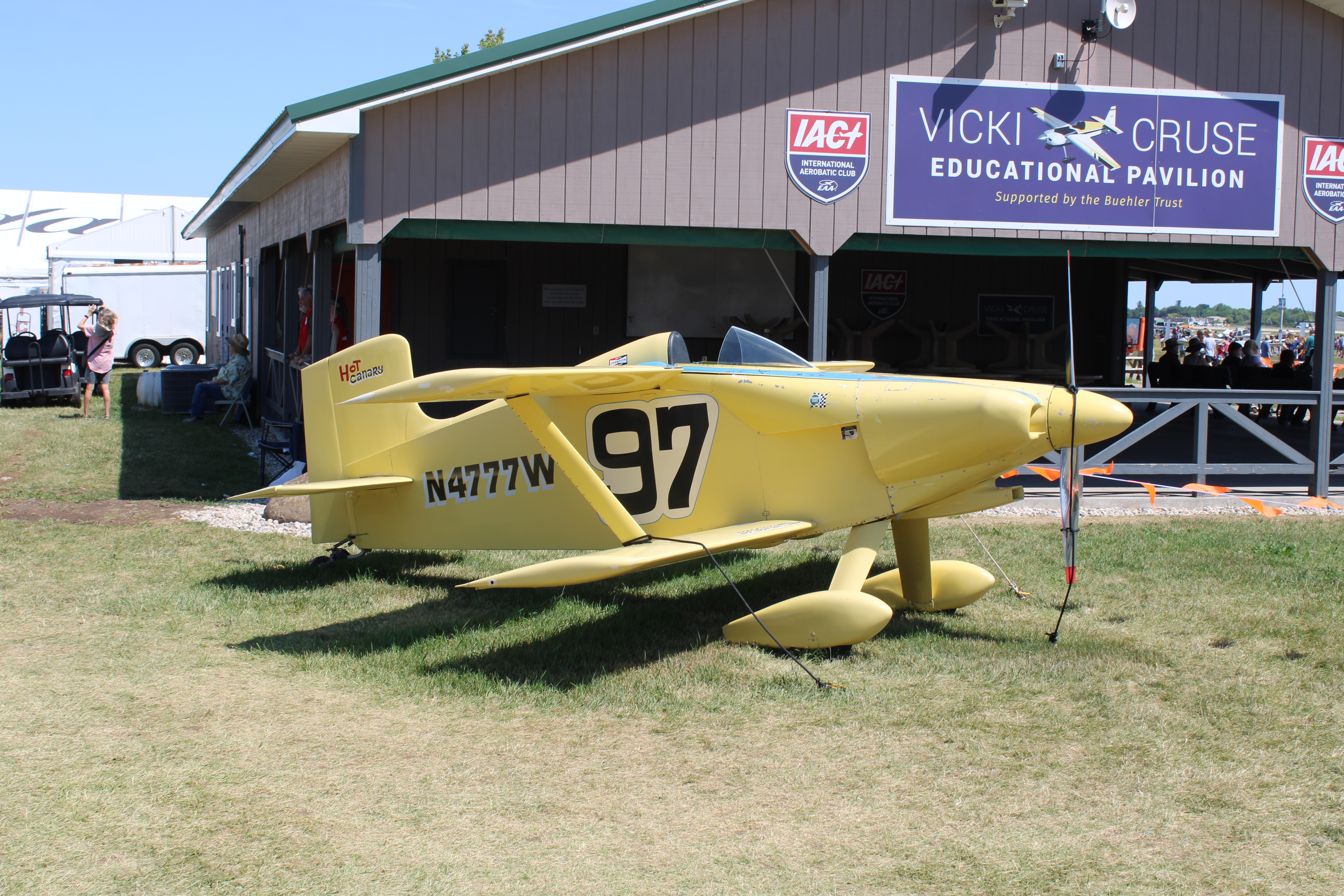
A Warwick W-4 pictured outside the Vicki Cruse Educational Pavilion

=== Memorials and honors ===
At the time of her death she lived in Santa Paula, California. Cruse was a member of Ventura County Chapter of the Ninety-Nines. After her death, the Ninety-Nines and the International Aerobatic Club created a scholarship for pilots in her memory, the IAC CP Aviation Emergency Maneuver Training Scholarship. The scholarship provides a fully paid training in emergency maneuver and spin training in addition to an introduction to aerobatics.

In 2010, the Vicki Cruse Educational Pavilion was dedicated and opened by the International Aerobatic Club on the grounds of the EAA Aviation Center in Oshkosh, Wisconsin.

Vicki's Glasair III "Cruse Missile" was later piloted in her honor by her friend Vicky Benzing at the Reno Air Races.
