= Symphony SA-160 =

Two-seat, single-engine, high-wing airplane

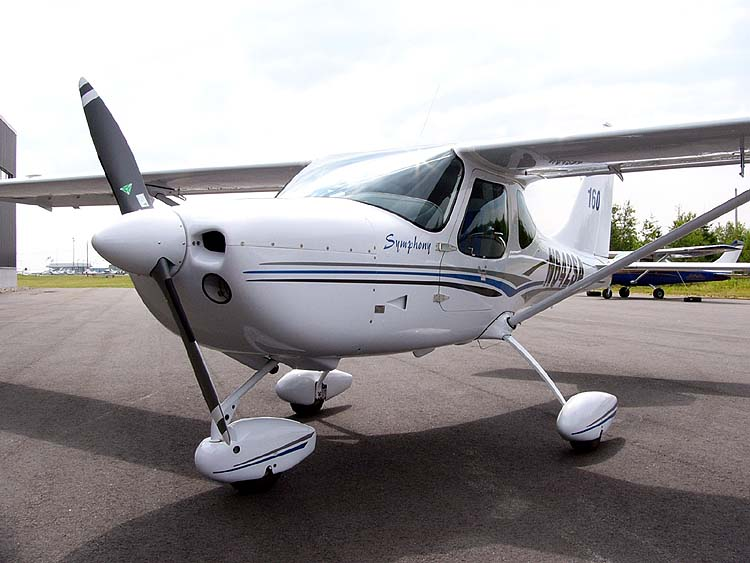

General information
- Type: Light aircraft
- National origin: Germany/Canada
- Manufacturer: Ostmecklenburgische Flugzeugbau; Symphony Aircraft Industries
- Status: Production completed

History
- Manufactured: 2001–2003; 2005–2006
- Introduction date: 2001
- Developed from: Stoddard-Hamilton Glastar

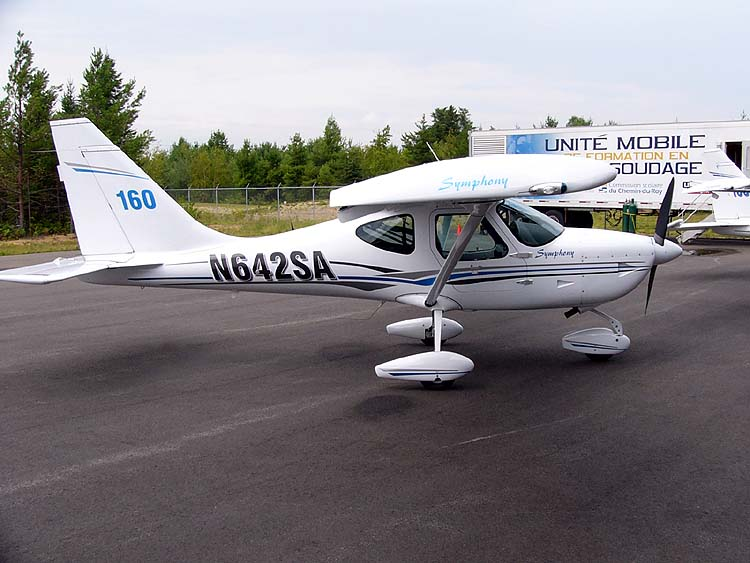
The Symphony SA-160 side view

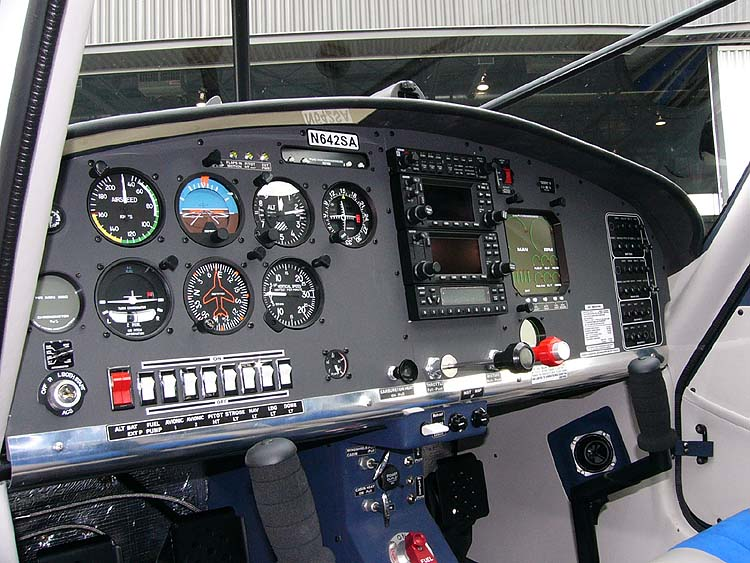
The Symphony SA-160 standard instrument panel

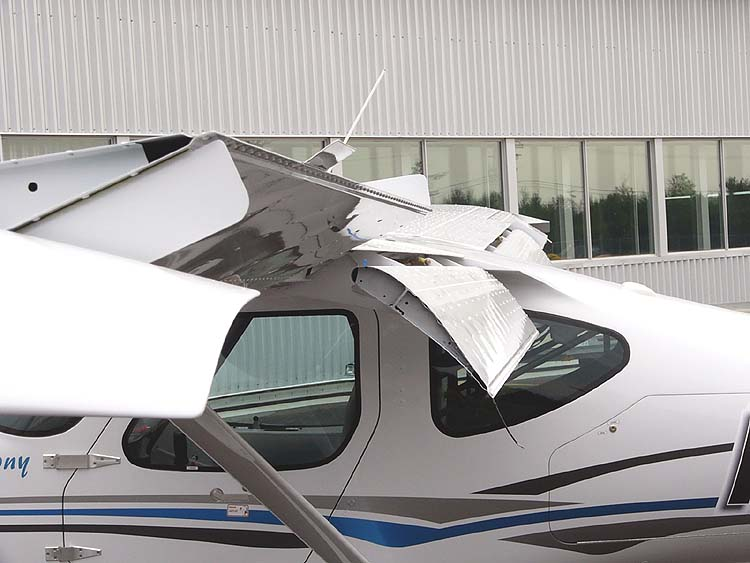
Symphony SA-160 showing 40 degree deflection on its Fowler flaps and its aileron end fences

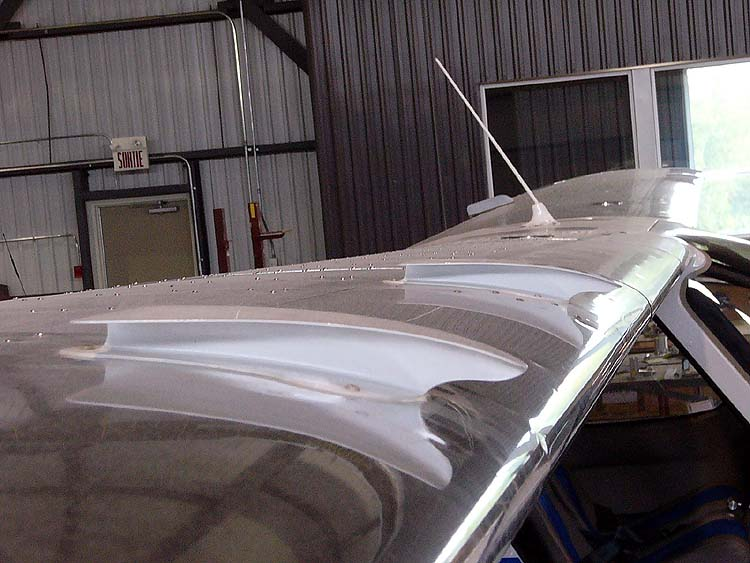
The Symphony SA-160 has two unique vortex generators on its wing to ensure aileron effectiveness through the stall

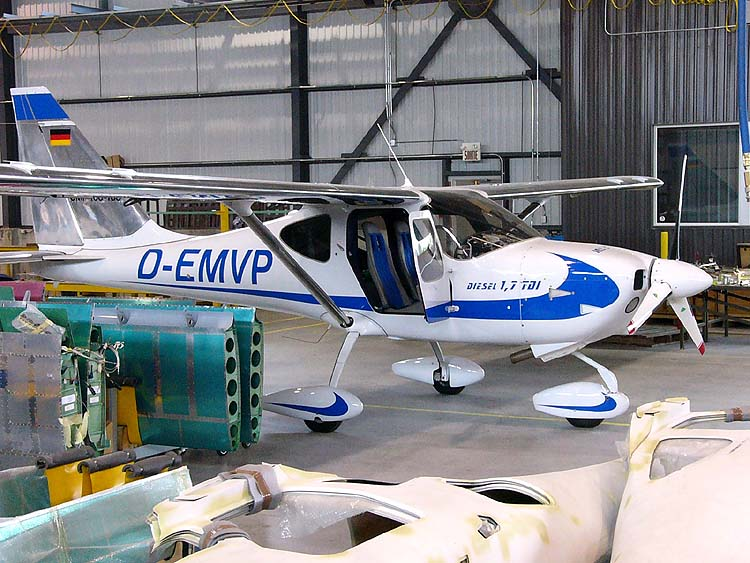
The OMF-100-135 Symphony Thielert Centurion 1.7 diesel equipped prototype

The Symphony SA-160 is a CAR 523 certified, two-seat, single-engine, high-wing airplane that was manufactured by Symphony Aircraft Industries in Trois-Rivières, Quebec, Canada in the mid-2000s.

The SA-160 is a development of the Stoddard-Hamilton Glastar amateur-built kit aircraft and is externally similar to that design.

== Development ==
The SA-160 was developed from the Glastar by incorporating many significant changes to the basic design with the aim of simplifying construction and complying with certification requirements. The redesign work was completed by the engineering staff of Ostmecklenburgische Flugzeugbau (OMF Aircraft), (East Mecklenburg Aircraft Works Limited) of Neubrandenburg, Mecklenburg-Vorpommern, Germany between 1998 and 2000. The aircraft produced by OMF were sold under the designation OMF-100-160 Symphony. Later aircraft produced by Symphony Aircraft are designated Symphony SA-160.

The SA-160 has an aluminum wing design, utilizing a NASA GAW-2 Whitcomb airfoil. To simplify construction the wing has no washout and instead has two composite vortex generators of a unique design, outboard on each wing, to ensure that the inboard portion of the wing stalls first, thus retaining aileron control through the stall.

The wing is equipped with slotted Fowler flaps, which occupy 2/3 of the span. These deploy to 40 degrees and lower the stall speed by 9 knots to 51 knots (60 mph). The flaps are always set to 20 degrees for takeoff. The ailerons are operated by control sticks and feature end-fences inboard and outboard for better slow speed and stall handling.

The fuselage is a 4130 welded steel tube cage covered in a non-structural fibreglass skin. The tail group is a mix of fibreglass fairings and aluminum surfaces.

The SA-160 is powered by a Lycoming O-320-D2A powerplant of 160 hp, driving a two-bladed wood fixed pitch MT propeller.

Symphony Aircraft continued the development started by OMF on a Thielert Centurion 1.7 diesel powered version, which OMF had designated as the OMF-100-135. The performance with the 135 hp engine was disappointing and the project was shelved in 2005.

Standard VFR avionics include a Garmin GNC 250XL GPS/COMM and GTX 320A Transponder The IFR avionics package consists of a Garmin 430 GPS/COMM, a 420 GPS/COMM and a Garmin GTX 327 transponder. The engine instruments are a Vision Microsystems VM 1000.

The landing gear is of a tricycle configuration with all three wheels mounted on steel sprung gear legs. The nosewheel is free castering and the aircraft is steered with differential braking. The brakes are mounted conventionally on the rudder pedal toes.

Prior to Symphony's bankruptcy, plans for the design included a 180 hp version to be called the SA-180 and a floatplane or amphibious floatplane version.

== Options ==
The SA-160 was offered with an Avidyne glass cockpit Entegra EXP5000 Primary Flight Display, Entegra EX5000 Multi-Function Display and EMax Engine Indication System to replace the standard round instruments fitted.

A Ballistic Recovery Systems whole aircraft parachute system was also available. Other options included a TAS 600 Traffic Advisory System and a Sensenich two bladed fixed pitch climb propeller to replace the MT two bladed wood/composite propeller.

On April 3, 2006 Symphony Aircraft announced that a tuned exhaust system made by Power Flow Systems would be offered as an option on the SA-160. This US$1600 option was forecast to give a 10% improvement in rate of climb to about 781 ft/min, an increased optimal cruise speed of about 5 knots to about 133 knots, or 0.5 to 1.5 US gallon per hour decrease in fuel burn, down to about 7.5 US gallons per hour.

== Pricing ==
In 2006 Symphony offered the basic VFR equipped SA-160 for US$154,900, the IFR version for US$169,900 and the glass cockpit equipped version for US$214,900.

== Production ==
The SA-160 entered production as the OMF-100-160 Symphony in 2001 and 40 aircraft were completed before OMF went out of business in December 2003.

Production resumed at Symphony Aircraft Industries with the first SA-160 aircraft delivered on 13 May 2005. By June 2006 production had ceased as Symphony Aircraft Industries sought additional capital to resume production. On 22 January 2007, the company declared bankruptcy and ceased operations.

On 3 February 2008 it was publicly announced that Lou Simons, the former lead investor in Symphony Aircraft, was planning to restart production of the SA-160 under the company name North American Factory for Technologically Advanced Aircraft (NAFTAA).

The new company announced in July 2008 that they intended to restart production by the end of 2009 at the previous plant in Trois-Rivières, Québec. They intended to produce 15 aircraft in 2009 and increase production to 50 to 80 per year by 2012. The aircraft would be given a new name and would have been available in a VFR version intended for flight school use, a basic IFR version, and a glass cockpit equipped version powered by a 200-hp Lycoming IO-390 powerplant giving it a forecast cruise speed of 148 knots. The plans were not completed and production did not resume.

Aviatech Technical Services of Trois-Rivières, Quebec in Canada is the current type certificate holder for the SA-160 and the OMF-100-150.

== Specifications (SA-160) ==
Data from Hunt and Symphony Aircraft

General characteristics

- Crew: one
- Capacity: one passenger
- Length: 22 ft 10 in (6.96 m)
- Wingspan: 35 ft 0 in (10.67 m)
- Height: 9 ft 3 in (2.82 m)
- Wing area: 128 sq ft (11.9 m^{2})
- Empty weight: 1,450 lb (658 kg)
- Gross weight: 2,150 lb (975 kg)
- Fuel capacity: 32.2 U.S. gallons (122 L; 26.8 imp gal)
- Powerplant: 1 × Lycoming O-320-D2A four cylinder, horizontally-opposed piston aircraft engine, 160 hp (120 kW)
- Propellers: 2-bladed fixed pitch MT Propeller

Performance

- Maximum speed: 130 kn (150 mph, 240 km/h) at sea level
- Stall speed: 50 kn (58 mph, 93 km/h) flaps down
- Never exceed speed: 162 kn (186 mph, 300 km/h)
- Range: 425 nmi (489 mi, 787 km) at 62% power at 8,000 ft (VFR reserves)
- Endurance: 3.6 hours
- Service ceiling: 16,400 ft (5,000 m)
- Rate of climb: 710 ft/min (3.6 m/s)
- Wing loading: 16.73 lb/sq ft (81.7 kg/m^{2})
- Power/mass: 13.4 lbs/hp (8.19 kg/kW)

== See also ==
Related development

- Glastar

Aircraft of comparable role, configuration, and era

- Alpha 2000 (Robin R2000)
- Cessna 150
- Cessna 152
- Cessna 172
- Diamond DA20
- Liberty XL2
