= Glasair Sportsman 2+2 =

American kit airplane

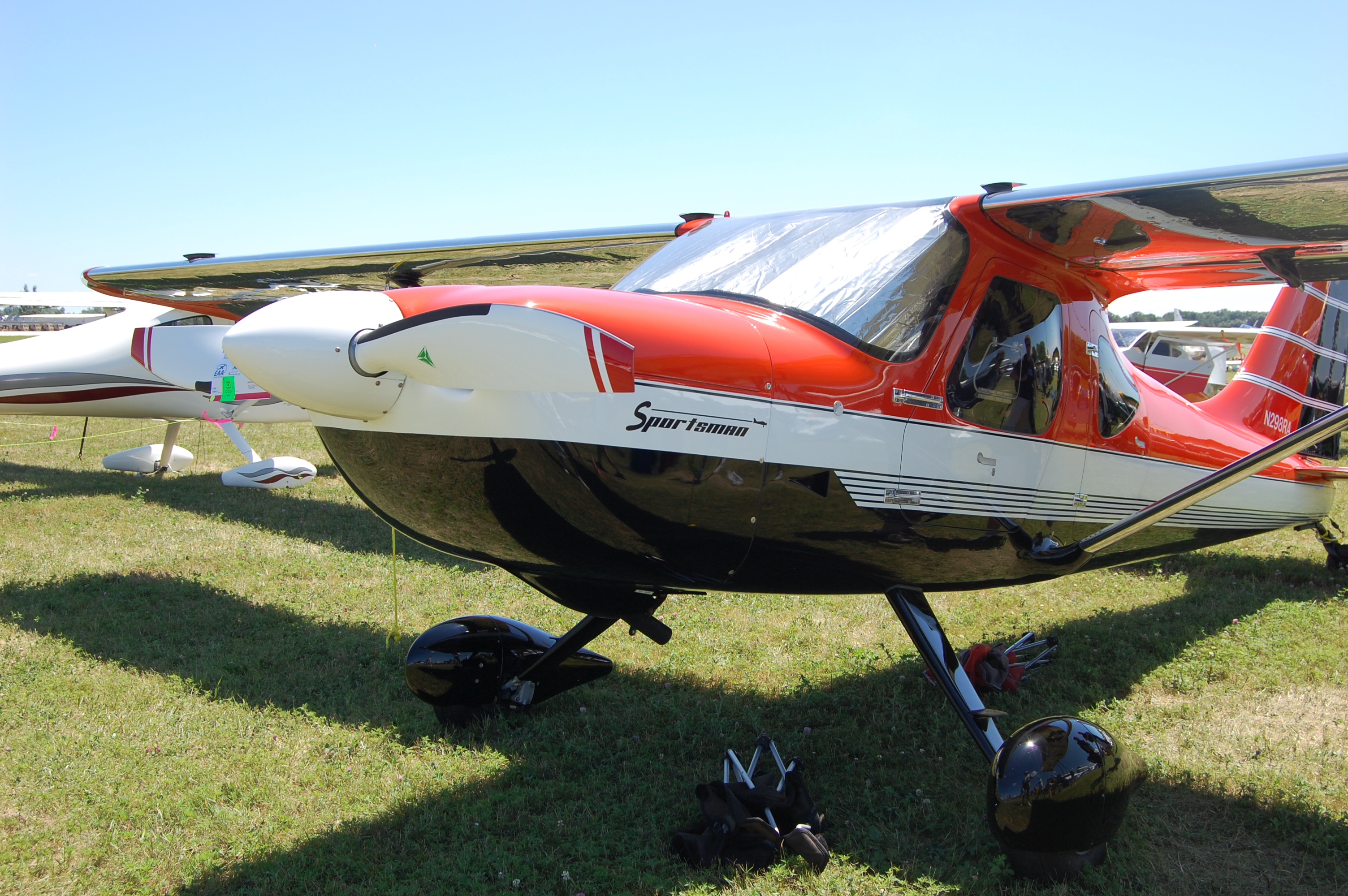

General information
- Type: Civil kit aircraft
- Manufacturer: Glasair
- Status: In production

History
- Manufactured: 2003 to date
- Developed from: Glasair GlaStar

The Glasair Sportsman 2+2 is a single-engine, high wing, strut-braced, four seat kit aircraft, developed by the Glasair Aviation company.

== Design and development ==
The Sportsman 2+2 was developed from the company's Glastar aircraft, a smaller version. The company's "Two Weeks to Taxi" program provides factory-assisted assembly, while providing the owner with training in using tools and jigs. This complies with the Federal Aviation Administration's 51% construction rule, allowing issuance of a Special Certificate of Airworthiness as an amateur-built aircraft.

The aircraft can be fitted with tricycle landing gear or conventional landing gear and can also be equipped with floats and amphibious floats or tundra tires. The completed aircraft can be switched between any of the three landing gear configurations.

The aircraft is constructed with a fiberglass fuselage, or optionally from carbon fiber, with all metal wings and horizontal stabilizer and elevator. The airplane is available with a 180 hp (134 kW)Lycoming IO-360 engine or a 210 hp (157 kW) Lycoming IO-390 engine with an optional constant speed propeller. or with a 155 hp (114 kW) Continental CD-155 diesel engine that is certified to run on either diesel or jet fuel.

Citing a decline in sales and high manufacturing costs, the company announced in July 2023 that production would move from Washington in the USA, to Zhenjiang, Jiangsu province, China. A new production facility is being constructed which has also put a pause on new builds until the factory is completed in two years' time. Orders already placed and builds that are currently in progress will be finished in Washington, with all new orders being produced in the Chinese factory once construction is complete. According to an email sent to their customer database, Glasair technical support will continue to be US-based. It is unclear if the company's "Two-Weeks To Taxi" program will remain in place or if the plane will be offered solely as a kit.

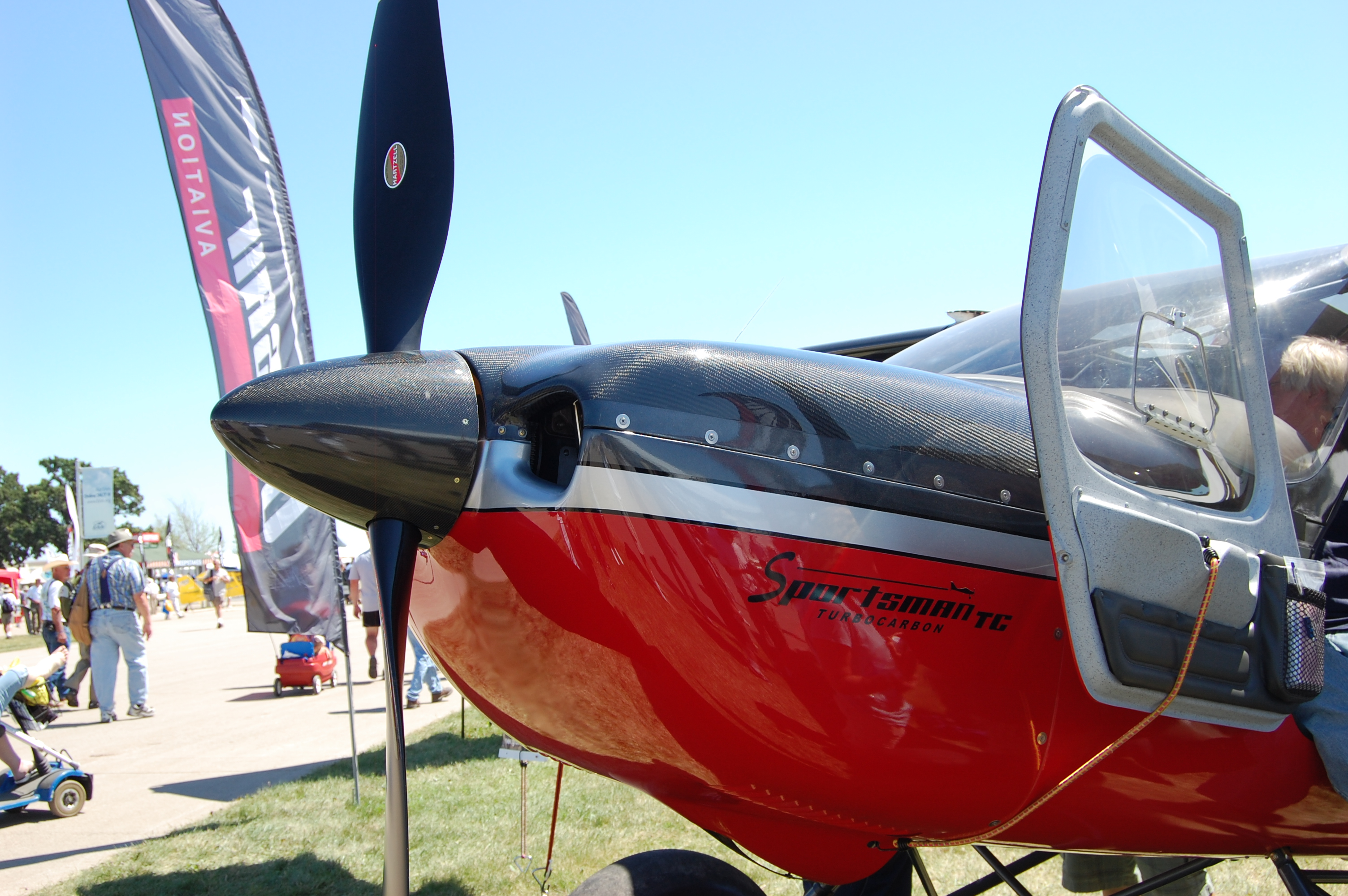
The Glasair Sportsman TC (Turbo Carbon), showing its predominately carbon-fiber fuselage

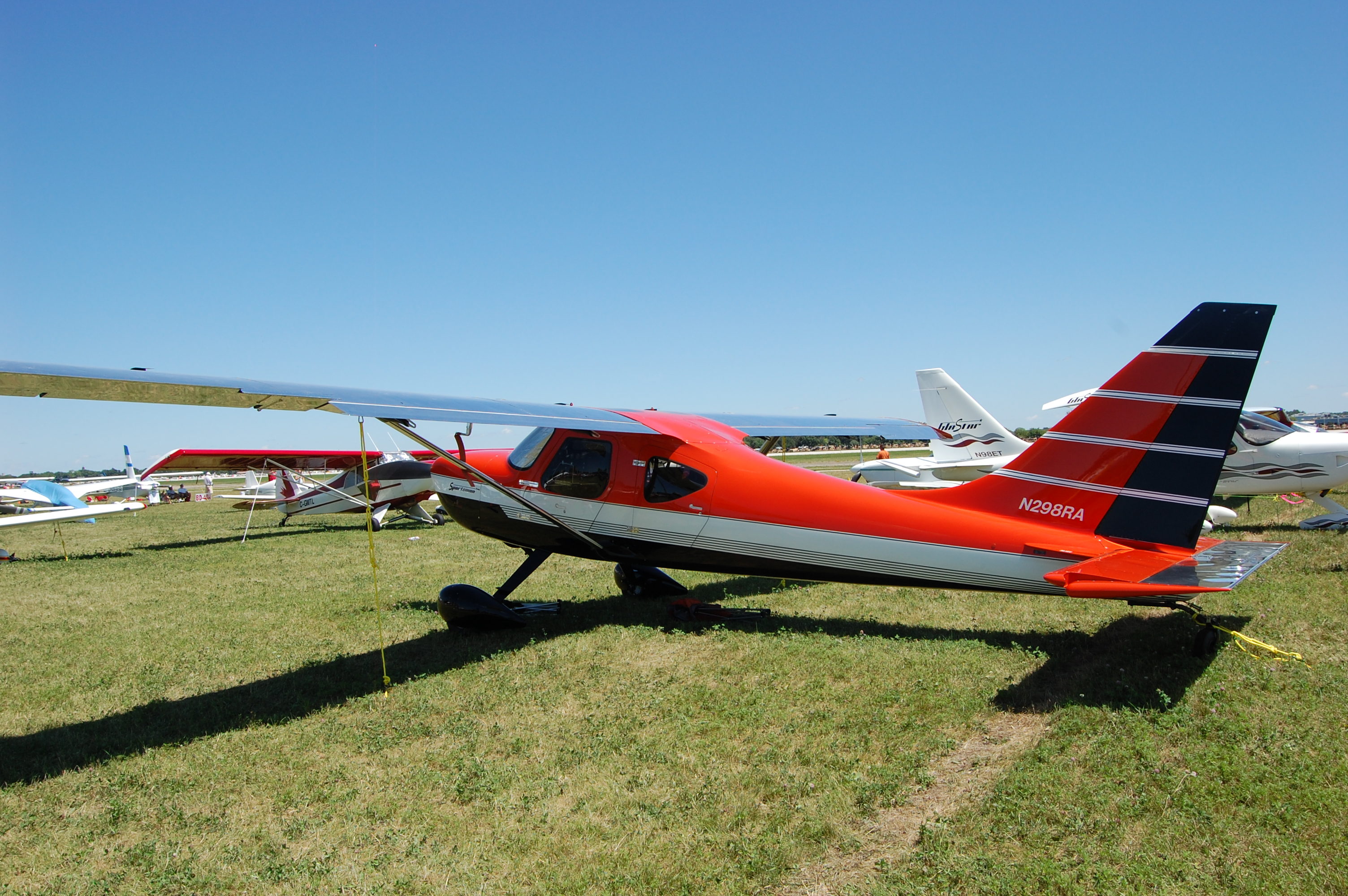
A fiberglass Sportsman

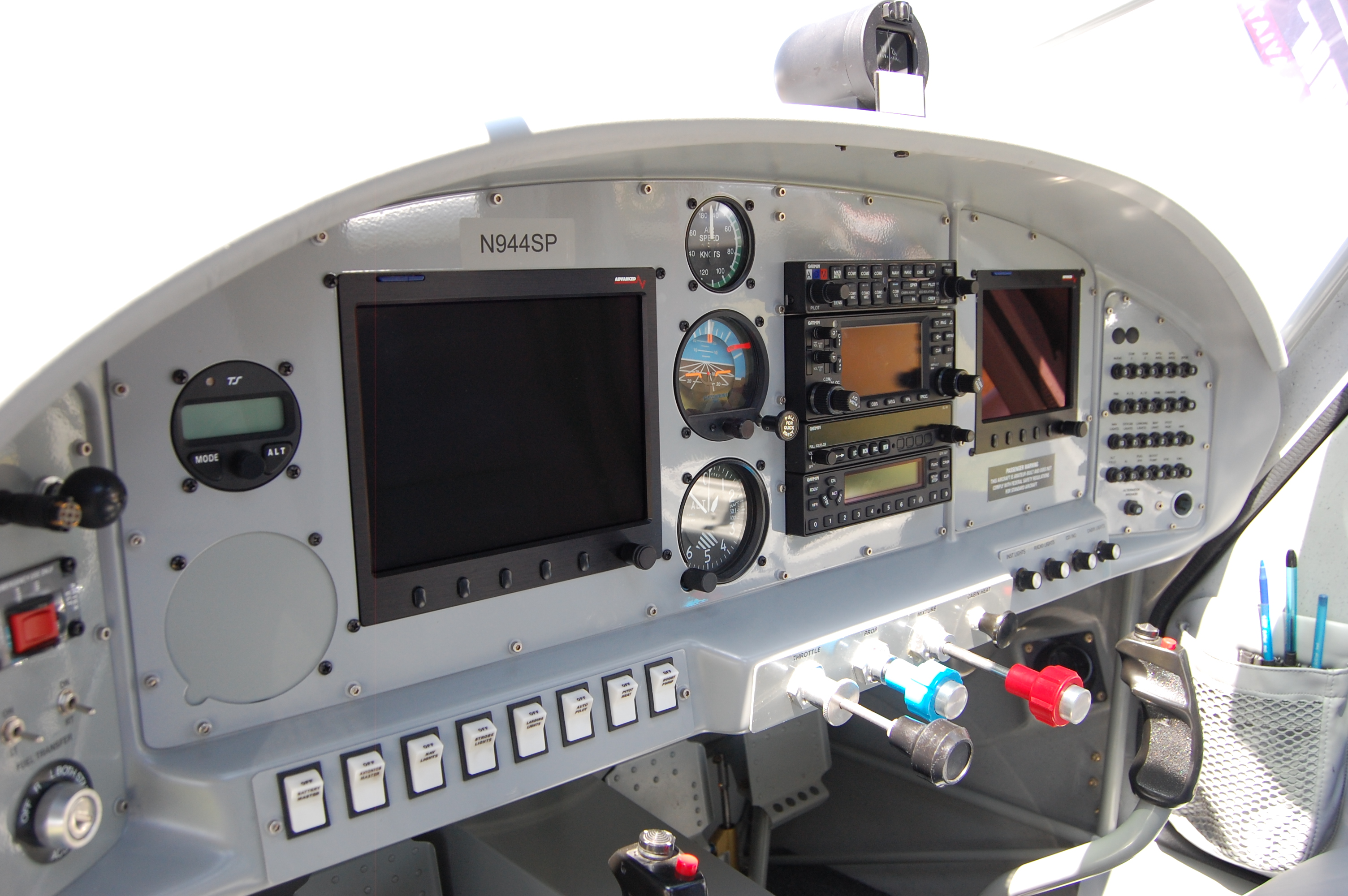
The cockpit of a Glasair Sportsman

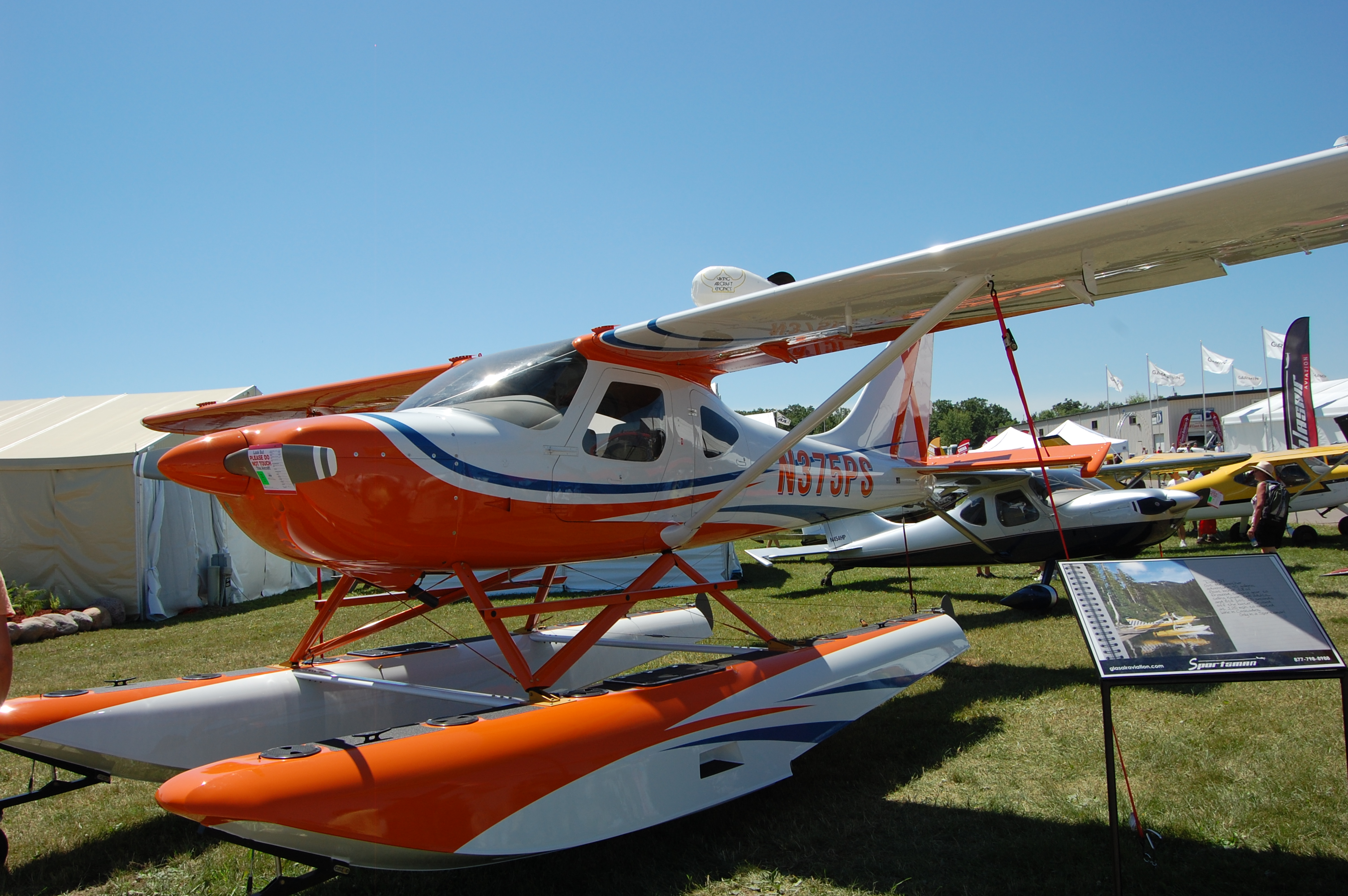
A Glasair Sportsman 2+2 on floats

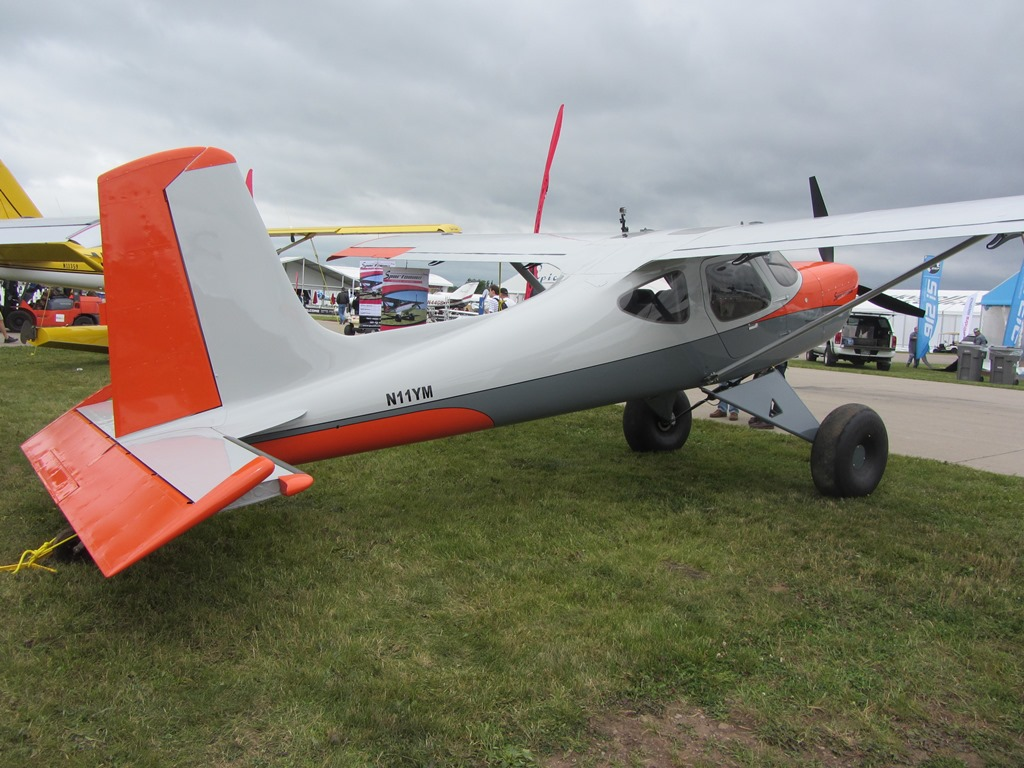
Sportsman with Tundra tires

== Variants ==
Glasair Sportsman 2+2 Diesel
A Thielert Centurion 2.0s powered variant.

Carbon Sportsman
A variant with the fuselage constructed of carbon fiber rather than fiberglass. The weight savings of carbon fiber are negated by heavier duty cage, wing struts, and wing skins; both variants have the same empty weight, but the carbon variant gross weight is increased by 150 lb.

== Specifications (Sportsman 2+2) ==
Data from Glasair website

General characteristics

- Crew: one
- Capacity: three passengers
- Length: 23 ft 0 in (7.01 m)
- Wingspan: 35 ft 0 in (10.67 m)
- Height: 6 ft 11 in (2.11 m) on conventional landing gear
- Wing area: 131 sq ft (12.2 m^{2})
- Aspect ratio: 9.1:1
- Empty weight: 1,350 lb (612 kg) (typical)
- Gross weight: 2,350 lb (1,066 kg) on wheels. (2500 lb / 1,134 kg for the carbon fiber version)
- Fuel capacity: 50 US gallons (189 litres)
- Powerplant: 1 × Lycoming IO-360 , 180 hp (130 kW)
- Propellers: 2-bladed Hartzell constant-speed propeller

Performance

- Maximum speed: 167 mph (269 km/h, 145 kn) TAS at Sea Level
- Cruise speed: 158 mph (254 km/h, 137 kn) at 75% power, TAS
- Stall speed: 48 mph (77 km/h, 42 kn) flaps down
- Range: 829 mi (1,334 km, 721 nmi) with VFR reserves, at 65% power
- Service ceiling: 20,000 ft (6,100 m) estimated
- g limits: +3.8/-1.5 g
- Rate of climb: 1,000 ft/min (5.1 m/s) at maximum gross weight
- Wing loading: 17.5 lb/sq ft (85 kg/m^{2})
