= Stoddard-Hamilton Glasair I =

US high-performance homebuilt aircraft

Glasair I
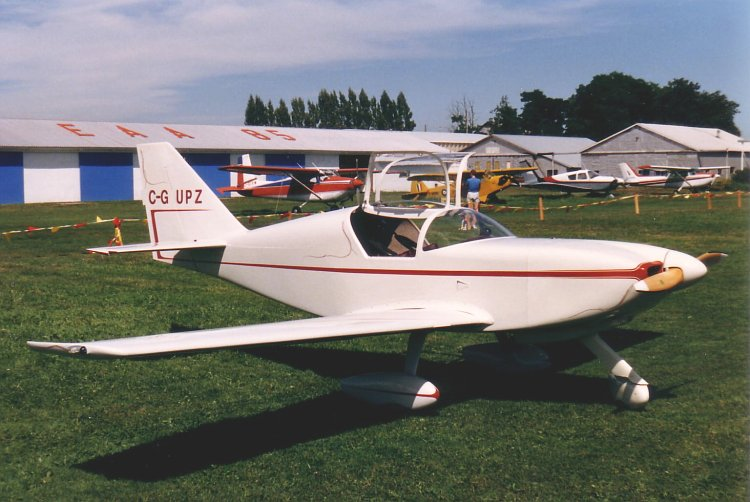

General information
- Type: Amateur-built kit airplane
- Manufacturer: Stoddard-Hamilton Aircraft; Glasair Aviation
- Designer: Tom Hamilton
- Number built: 807

History
- Introduction date: 1980
- First flight: 1979
- Developed into: Stoddard-Hamilton Glasair II

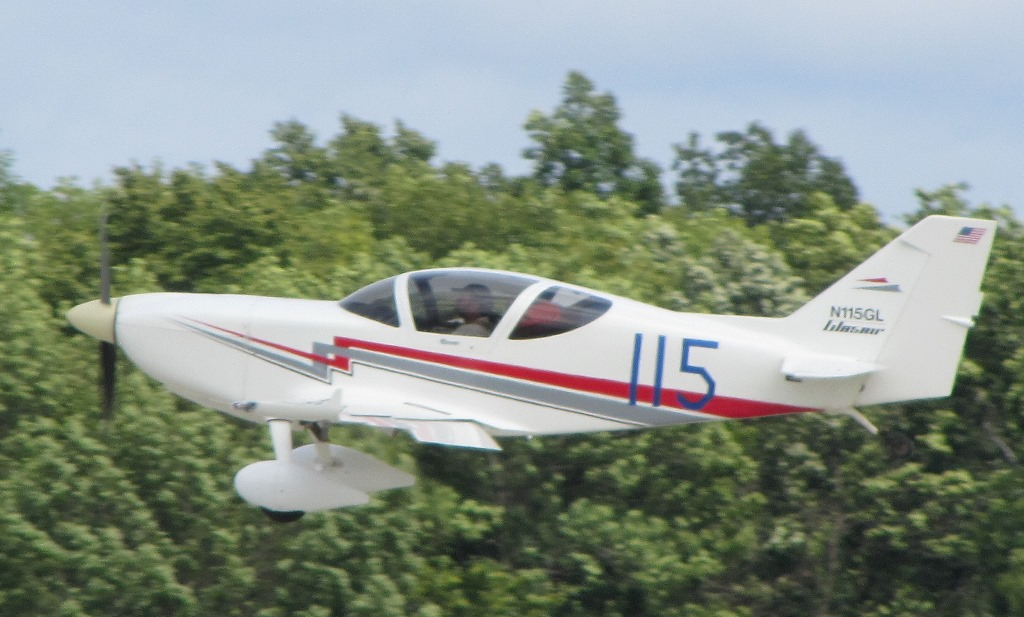
Glasair I TD (modified with non-standard dorsal fin)

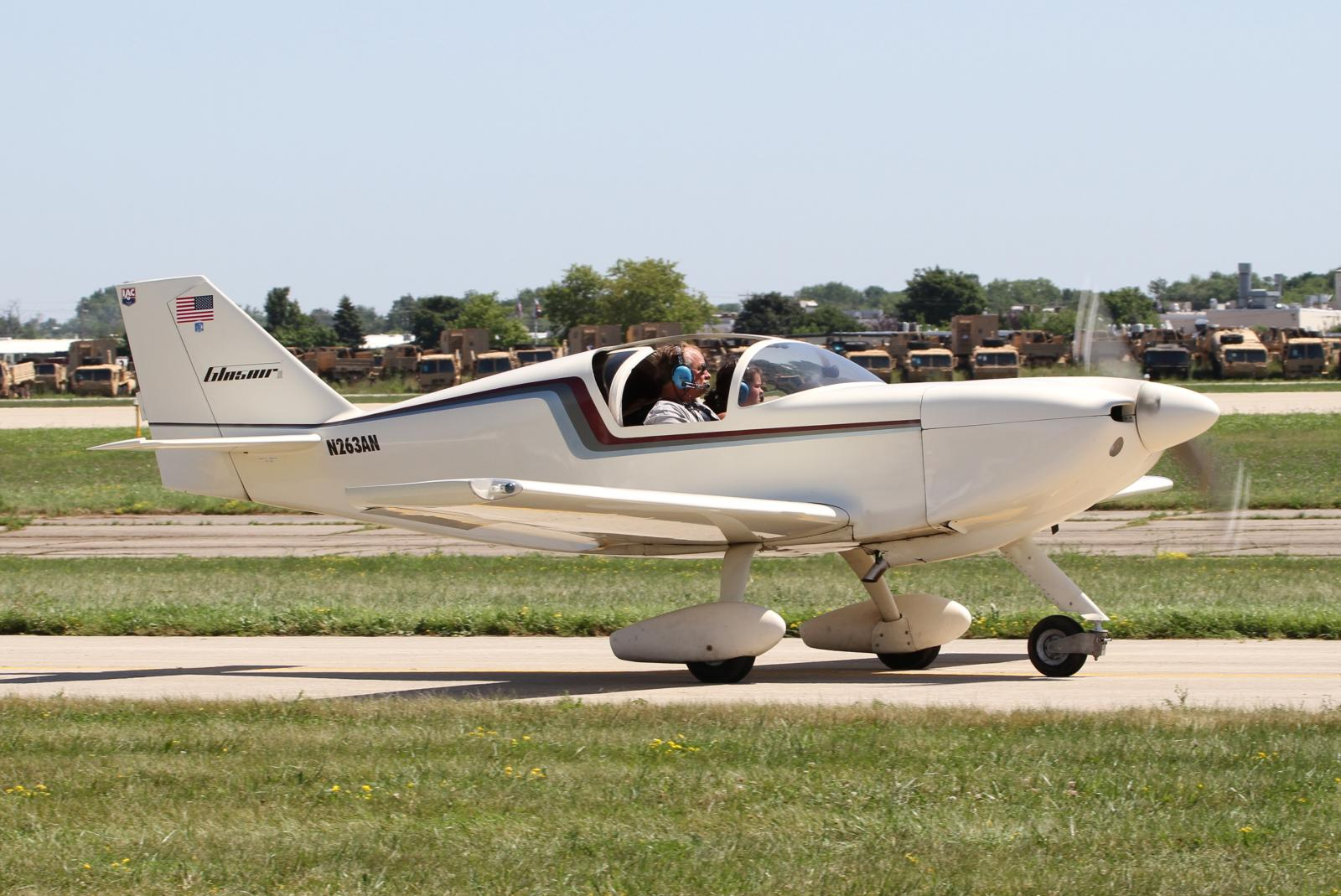
Glasair I. EAA AirVenture 2011

The Glasair I, originally built as the prototype Glasair TD taildragger, is a high-performance homebuilt aircraft built of fiberglass. Created by Tom Hamilton as a fast, two-seat kitplane, the Glasair TD was derived from the earlier Tom Hamilton Glasair and first flew in 1979. Hamilton formed Stoddard-Hamilton Aircraft that year to produce and market the kit, which was the first pre-molded composite aircraft available to builders. It was introduced to the public at the 1980 EAA Convention in Oshkosh, Wisconsin, winning Hamilton the 1985 EAA August Raspet Award for "significant advancements in the field of light aircraft design".

== Specifications (Glasair 1) ==
Data from Pilot Friend

General characteristics

- Crew: one
- Capacity: one passenger
- Length: 19 ft 6 in (5.94 m)
- Wingspan: 24 ft 4 in (7.42 m)
- Height: 6 ft 2 in (1.88 m)
- Wing area: 81.3 sq ft (7.55 m^{2})
- Empty weight: 1,368 lb (621 kg)
- Gross weight: 2,200 lb (998 kg)
- Fuel capacity: 61.4 US gallons (232 litres)
- Powerplant: 1 × Lycoming IO-360 A1B four cylinder, horizontally opposed, four stroke aircraft engine, 200 hp (150 kW)
- Propellers: 3-bladed Hoffmann VP with wood blades

Performance

- Maximum speed: 260 mph (420 km/h, 230 kn)
- Cruise speed: 201 mph (324 km/h, 175 kn)
- Stall speed: 65 mph (105 km/h, 56 kn)
- Never exceed speed: 260 mph (420 km/h, 230 kn)
- Range: 1,177 mi (1,894 km, 1,023 nmi)
- Service ceiling: 19,000 ft (5,800 m)
- Rate of climb: 1,500 ft/min (7.6 m/s)
- Wing loading: 27.06 lb/sq ft (132.1 kg/m^{2})
