= Stoddard-Hamilton T-9 Stalker =

T-9 Stalker

General information
- Type: Turboprop military training aircraft
- National origin: United States
- Manufacturer: Stoddard-Hamilton Aircraft
- Number built: 1

History
- First flight: 24 July 1988
- Developed from: Stoddard-Hamilton Glasair III

The Stoddard-Hamilton T-9 Stalker, Tactical Trainer, was an American military training monoplane designed and built by Stoddard-Hamilton Aircraft of Arlington, Washington and based on the Stoddard-Hamilton Glasair III.

== Design and development ==
First flown on 24 July 1988 the Stalker is a military training version of the Glasair III, an all-composite, cantilever, low-wing monoplane. The Stalker is powered by a 420 hp (313 kW) Allison 250-B17D turboprop driving a three-bladed metal tractor propeller. It has a retractable tricycle landing gear and the enclosed cockpit has two seats side-by-side with dual controls and a zero/zero pilot extraction system. The Stalker has two underwing hardpoints outboard of the landing gear for military ordnance. The prototype was destroyed in a fatal accident on 29 May 1989.

== Specifications ==
Data from Jane's All the World's Aircraft 1989–90

General characteristics

- Crew: 2
- Length: 21 ft 9.5 in (6.64 m)
- Wingspan: 23 ft 3.5 in (7.10 m)
- Height: 7 ft 3 in (2.21 m)
- Wing area: 81.2 sq ft (7.54 m^{2})
- Empty weight: 1,500 lb (680 kg)
- Gross weight: 2,700 lb (1,225 kg)
- Powerplant: 1 × Allison 250-B17D turboprop , 420 hp (313 kW)

Performance

- Maximum speed: 403 mph (649 km/h, 350 kn)
- Cruise speed: 366 mph (589 km/h, 318 kn)
- Stall speed: 70 mph (113 km/h, 61 kn)
- Range: 1,587 mi (2,554 km, 1,379 nmi)
- Service ceiling: 37,000 ft (11,280 m)
- g limits: +6.9/-4
- Rate of climb: 3,325 ft/min (1,689 m/s)
