= Ostmecklenburgische Flugzeugbau =

Defunct German aircraft manufacturer

Ostmecklenburgische Flugzeugbau GmbH
- Company type: Private
- Industry: Aerospace
- Founded: 1998
- Fate: Bankrupt December 2003
- Successor: Symphony Aircraft Industries
- Headquarters: Neubrandenburg, Mecklenburg-Western Pomerania
- Key people: Mathias Stinnes, CEO
- Products: General aviation aircraft

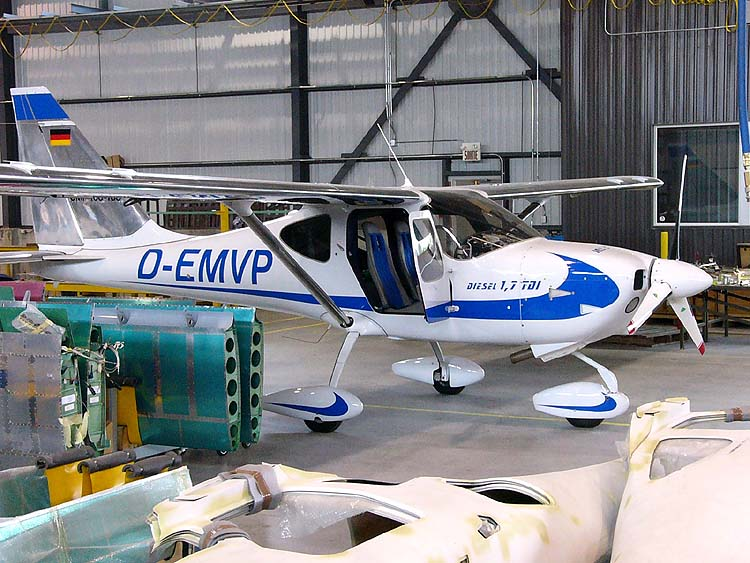
The OMF-100-135 Symphony Thielert Centurion 1.7 diesel-powered prototype

Ostmecklenburgische Flugzeugbau GmbH (East Mecklenburg Aircraft Works GmbH) was a German light aircraft manufacturer in Neubrandenburg, Mecklenburg-Western Pomerania. The company was commonly known as OMF Aircraft.

OMF was formed by Mathias Stinnes in 1998 and ceased operations in December 2003.

Stinnes formed OMF Aircraft to produce a certified version of the Stoddard-Hamilton Glastar designated the OMF-100-160 Symphony with certification achieved in 2001.

Realizing that the bulk of the market for this aircraft was in North America, Stinnes set up a production facility in Trois-Rivières, Quebec, Canada with financial help from the Government of Quebec. The plant building was constructed by the Town of Trois-Rivieres and leased to OMF. The plant was opened in September 2003.

OMF suffered from under-financing during its start-up phase and declared bankruptcy in December 2003, having produced 40 aircraft.

Production of the aircraft, under the designation Symphony SA-160, was resumed in 2005 by the former Canadian subsidiary operating under new ownership as Symphony Aircraft Industries.

== Aircraft by date ==
- OMF-100-160 Symphony (2001)
