= Glasair Merlin LSA =

American kit airplane

Merlin LSA
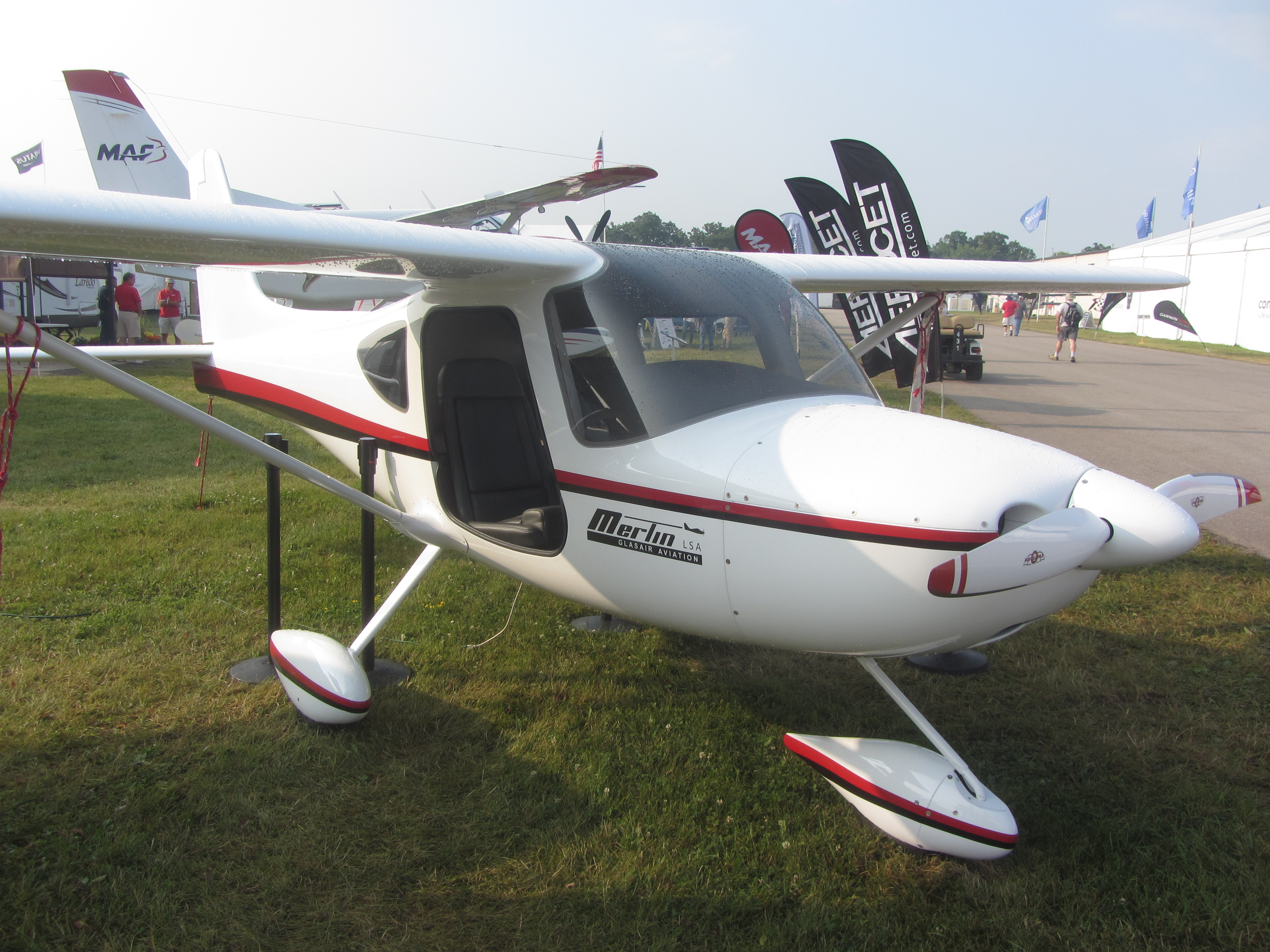
- Merlin LSA mock-up

General information
- Type: Light-sport aircraft
- National origin: United States
- Manufacturer: Glasair Aviation - Jilin Hanxing Group
- Status: In production

History
- Introduction date: 2014
- First flight: 7 April 2015

The Glasair Merlin is a light-sport aircraft under development by Chinese-owned, United States–based Glasair Aviation. It will be supplied as a ready-to-fly Special LSA aircraft.

The aircraft first flew on 7 April 2015 at Arlington, Washington and was accepted as a light-sport aircraft in late March 2016.

== Design and development ==
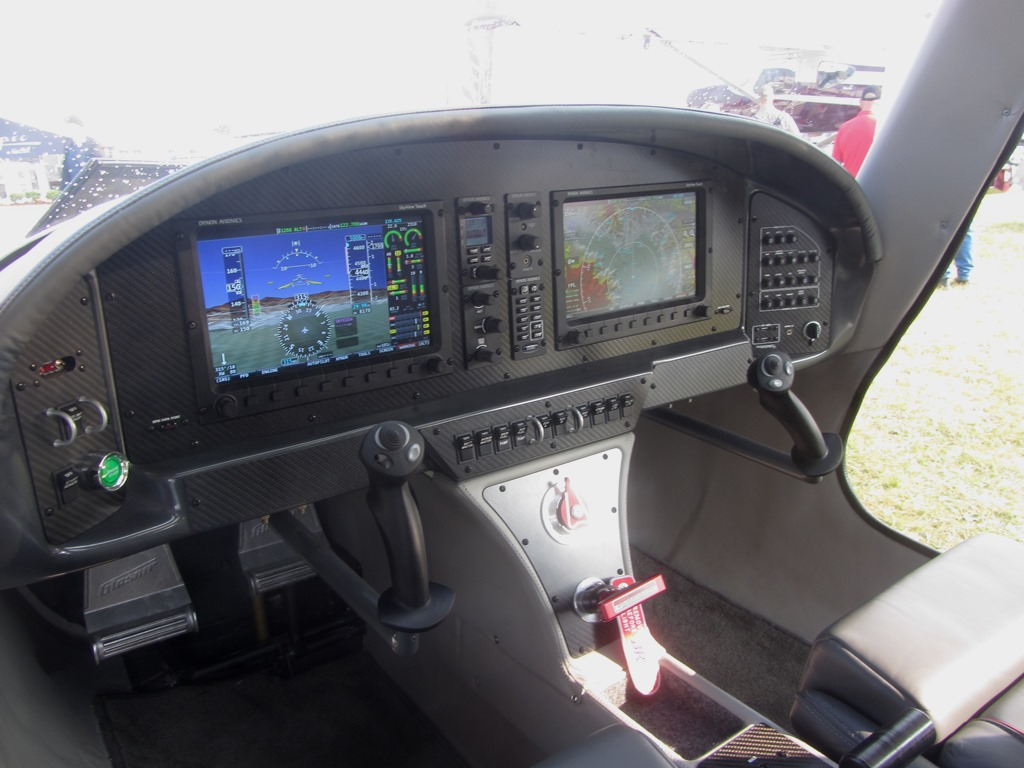
Glasair Merlin LSA Panel

Introduced in 2014, the Merlin LSA is a high-wing, two seats in side-by-side configuration, tricycle gear aircraft of all-composite construction. Avionics include a Dynon Skyview touch. A ballistic parachute is optional.

The aircraft will sell for US$139,000 for a well-equipped model. The design will carry two people and full fuel and is intended for use as a trainer and personal aircraft.

== Specifications (Merlin LSA) ==
Data from Flying

General characteristics

- Crew: 1
- Capacity: 1 passenger
- Powerplant: 1 × Rotax 912 iS horizontally opposed, fuel injected, piston aircraft engine, 100 hp (75 kW)
- Propellers: 2-bladed

Avionics

- Dynon Skyview
