= Glasair Aviation =

Chinese-owned aircraft manufacturer

Glasair Aviation USA, LLC
- Industry: Aerospace
- Predecessor: Stoddard-Hamilton Aircraft
- Founded: 2001
- Founders: Tom Hamilton and Thomas Wathen
- Headquarters: Arlington, Washington
- Key people: CEO: Randy Lervold
- Products: Homebuilt aircraft kits
- Owner: Jilin Hanxing Group
- Website: glasairaviation.com

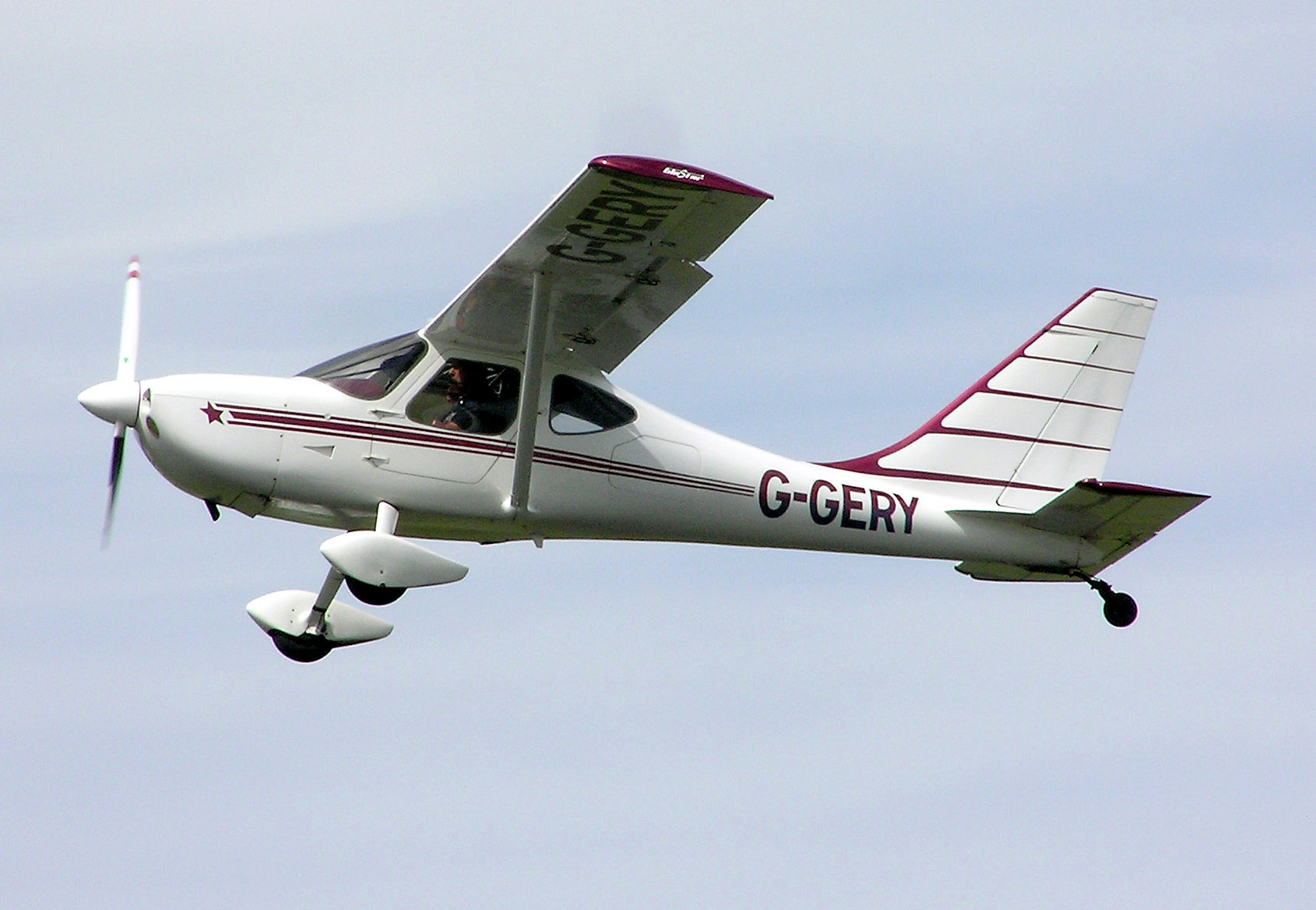
Glasair Glastar, built 2002

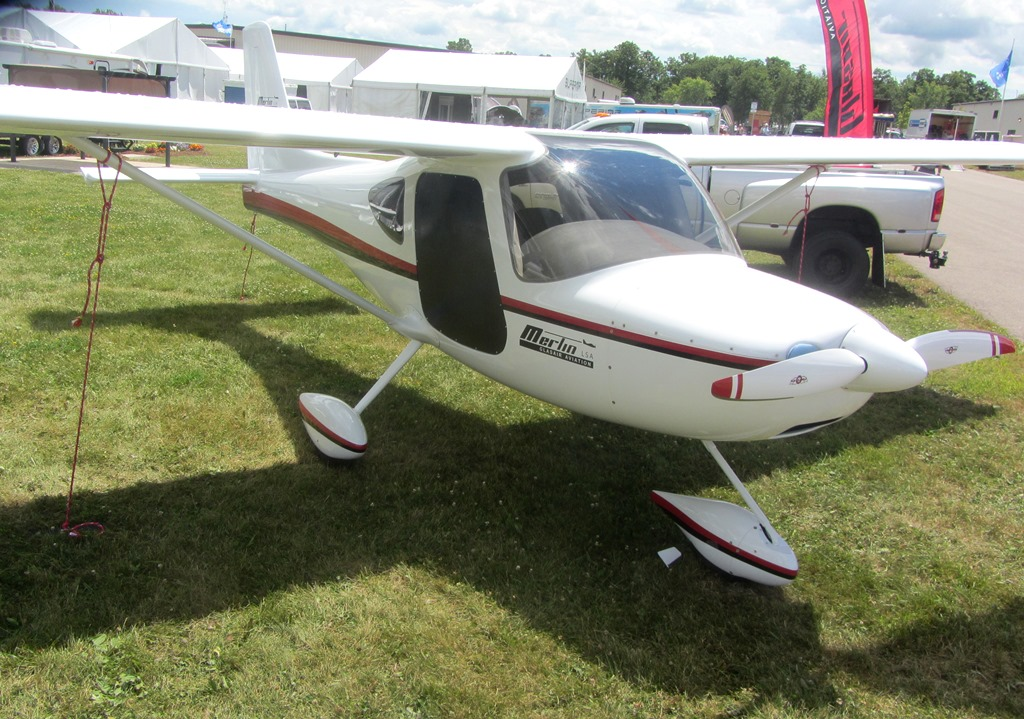
Glasair Merlin LSA

Glasair Aviation USA, LLC is a Chinese-owned aircraft manufacturer based in Arlington, Washington that produces the Glasair and Sportsman 2+2 line of homebuilt aircraft. More than 3000 Glasair kits have been delivered worldwide.

== History ==
Tom Hamilton began flight testing the Glasair TD and founded Stoddard-Hamilton Aircraft in 1979. Glasair Aviation was formed in 2001 when Thomas W. Wathen purchased the Glasair assets from bankrupt Stoddard-Hamilton Aircraft, Inc. and signed an agreement with Arlington Aircraft Development, Inc. (AADI) to buy all rights to and assets of the GlaStar model.

In July 2012 the company was sold to the Jilin Hanxing Group, which formed a new company Glasair Aircraft USA, LLC. The company indicated that it intended to certify the Glastar design and otherwise retain production in Arlington, Washington. Its chairman said that purchasing Glasair was "the first step in a very long journey" and envisioned the company producing trainers for flight schools and eventually personal aircraft for the Chinese market.

Randy Lervold became the company CEO on 14 May 2019.

In 2020, in response to the COVID-19 pandemic, Glasair paused sales and manufacturing and furloughed most of its production and builder-assist staff, retaining a core team for product support and engineering. Sportsman kit sales resumed in September 2021. In July 2023, the company again stopped accepting new kit orders while moving Sportsman production from Arlington, Washington, to Zhenjiang, Jiangsu, China. By December 2024, Sportsman airframes were being manufactured in China, and KITPLANES described the Sportsman kit as being in production, although the availability of Chinese-built kits in the United States remained uncertain.

== Aircraft ==
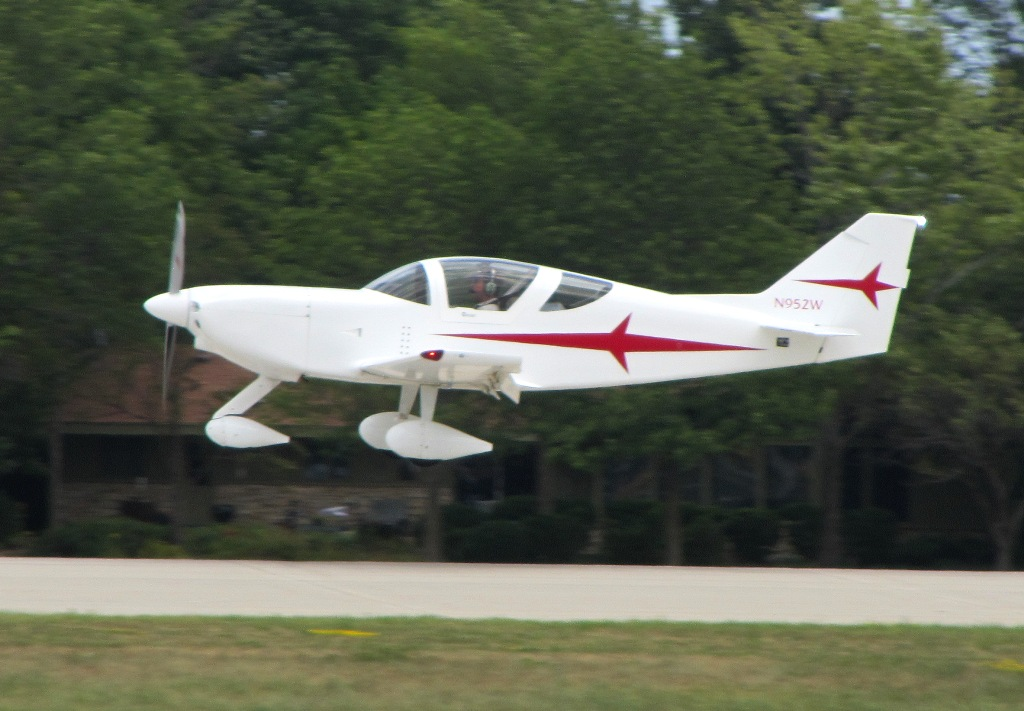
Glasair II

Aircraft built by Stoddard-Hamilton Aircraft and Glasair Aviation
Model name	First flight	Number built	Type
Glasair I	1979	807	Low-wing, two seat kit aircraft
Glasair II	1989	1200	Low-wing, two seat kit aircraft
Glasair III	1986	500	Low-wing, two seat kit aircraft
GlaStar	1994	600	High-wing, two seat kit aircraft
Sportsman 2+2	2003	400	High-wing, four seat kit aircraft
Glasair Merlin LSA	2015	1	High-wing, two seat SLSA aircraft

== See also ==
- Plane Driven PD-1, experimental modification to allow the aircraft to be roadable.
