= Stoddard-Hamilton Glasair II =

American homebuilt light aircraft

Glasair II
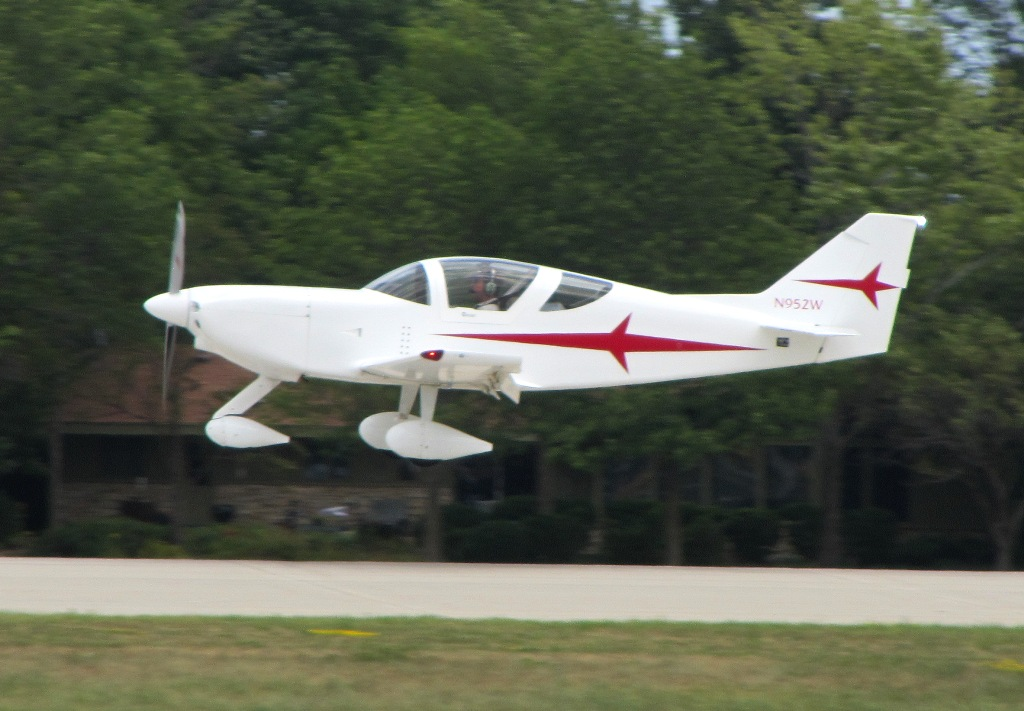
- Glasair Super II FT

General information
- Type: Amateur-built aircraft
- National origin: United States
- Manufacturer: Stoddard-Hamilton Aircraft; Glasair Aviation
- Designer: Tom Hamilton
- Status: In production (2012)
- Number built: 1200 (2012)

History
- First flight: 1989
- Developed from: Stoddard-Hamilton Glasair I
- Variant: Stoddard-Hamilton Glasair III

The Stoddard-Hamilton Glasair II is an American amateur-built aircraft that was designed by Tom Hamilton and produced by Stoddard-Hamilton Aircraft and later Glasair Aviation as a kit for amateur construction. It was first flown in 1989, and remained in production in 2012.

== Design and development ==
A development of the earlier Glasair I, the Glasair II features a cantilever low-wing, a two-seats-in-side-by-side configuration enclosed cockpit accessed via gull-winged doors, fixed or retractable tricycle landing gear or fixed conventional landing gear and a single engine in tractor configuration.

The Glasair II was designed to FAR Part 23 standards and was extensively tested. Its wing has been tested to +10.5g. As indicated by its name, the aircraft is made from fiberglass. Its 23.3 ft (7.1 m) span wing employs a NASA GA(W)-2 airfoil. The wings have an area of 81.3 sq ft (7.55 m^{2}) and mount flaps. The acceptable power range for the Super II RG or Super II FT versions is 160 to 210 hp (119 to 157 kW), with the 180 hp (134 kW) Lycoming O-360 four-stroke powerplant a commonly used engine.

The manufacturer estimates construction time for the Super II RG or Super II FT versions as 3000 hours.

The Glasair II was later developed into the Glasair III.

== Operational history ==
By December 2011 there were 1200 examples reported completed and flying making it one of the most successful two seat kit aircraft ever designed.

== Variants ==
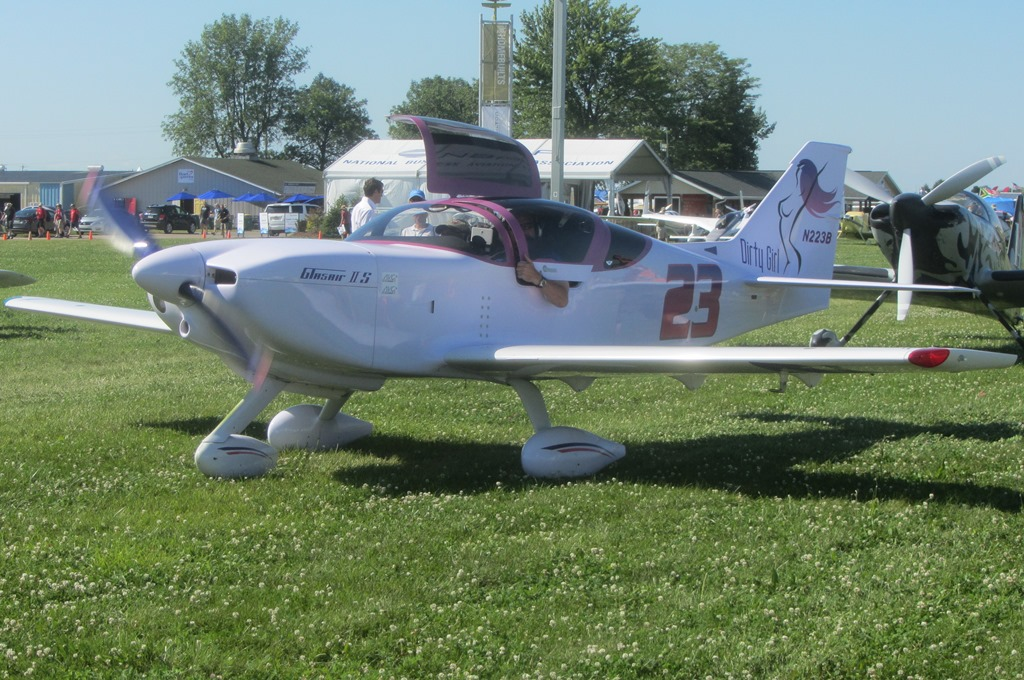
Glasair II-S

Glasair II-S
12 in (30 cm) stretch

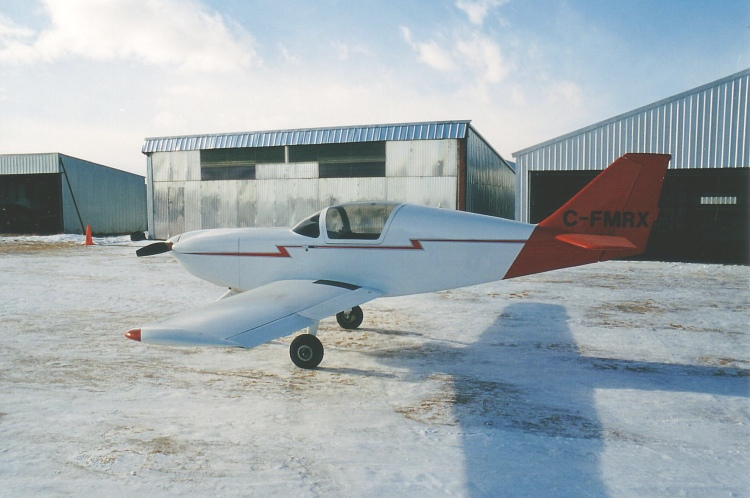
Glasair II FT

Glasair Super II FT
Fixed tricycle landing gear version, in production in 2011.

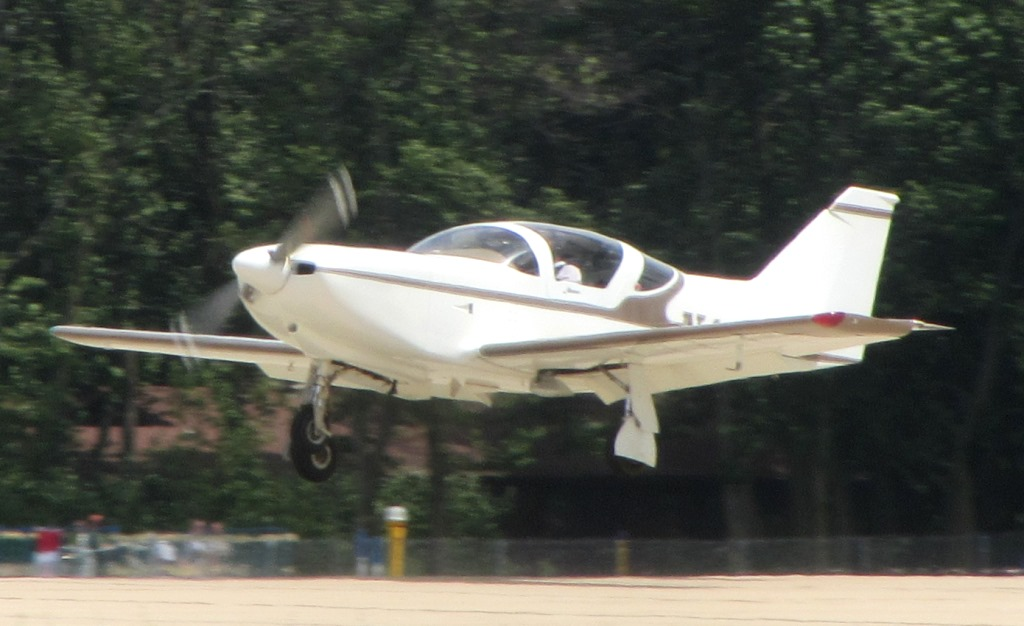
Glasair RG

Glasair Super II RG
Retractable tricycle landing gear version, in production in 2011.
Glasair Super II TD
Fixed taildragger landing gear version, in production in 1998, but production presently completed.

== Specifications (Glasair Super II RG) ==
Data from Kitplanes

General characteristics

- Crew: one
- Capacity: one passenger
- Length: 20.8 ft (6.3 m)
- Wingspan: 23.3 ft (7.1 m)
- Wing area: 81.3 sq ft (7.55 m^{2})
- Airfoil: NASA GA(W)-2
- Empty weight: 1,400 lb (635 kg)
- Gross weight: 2,100 lb (953 kg)
- Fuel capacity: 70 U.S. gallons (260 L; 58 imp gal)
- Powerplant: 1 × Lycoming O-360 four cylinder, air-cooled, four stroke aircraft engine, 180 hp (130 kW)
- Propellers: 2-bladed constant speed propeller

Performance

- Maximum speed: 238 mph (383 km/h, 207 kn)
- Cruise speed: 221 mph (356 km/h, 192 kn)
- Stall speed: 73 mph (117 km/h, 63 kn)
- Range: 1,750 mi (2,820 km, 1,520 nmi)
- Rate of climb: 2,700 ft/min (14 m/s)
- Wing loading: 25.8 lb/sq ft (126 kg/m^{2})
