= Stoddard-Hamilton Glasair III =

American two-seat, high-performance homebuilt aircraft

Glasair III
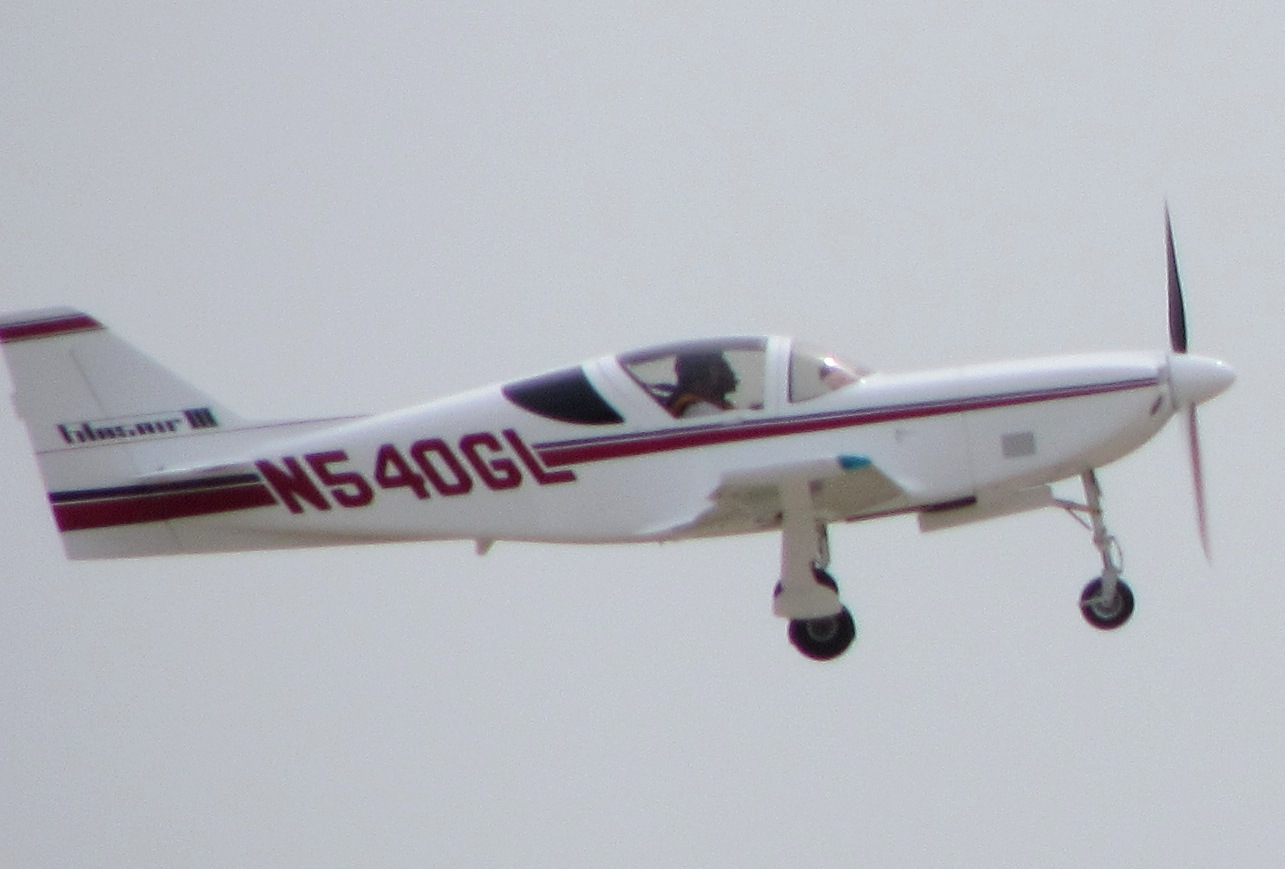

General information
- Type: Homebuilt light monoplane
- National origin: United States
- Manufacturer: Stoddard-Hamilton Aircraft
- Number built: 402

History
- Developed from: Stoddard-Hamilton Glasair II
- Developed into: Stoddard-Hamilton T-9 Stalker

The Stoddard-Hamilton Glasair III is an American two-seat, high-performance homebuilt aircraft designed and built by Stoddard-Hamilton Aircraft of Arlington, Washington as an addition to the Glasair range of aircraft for amateur construction. Glasair II and III assets were purchased by Advanced Aero Components in September 2017.

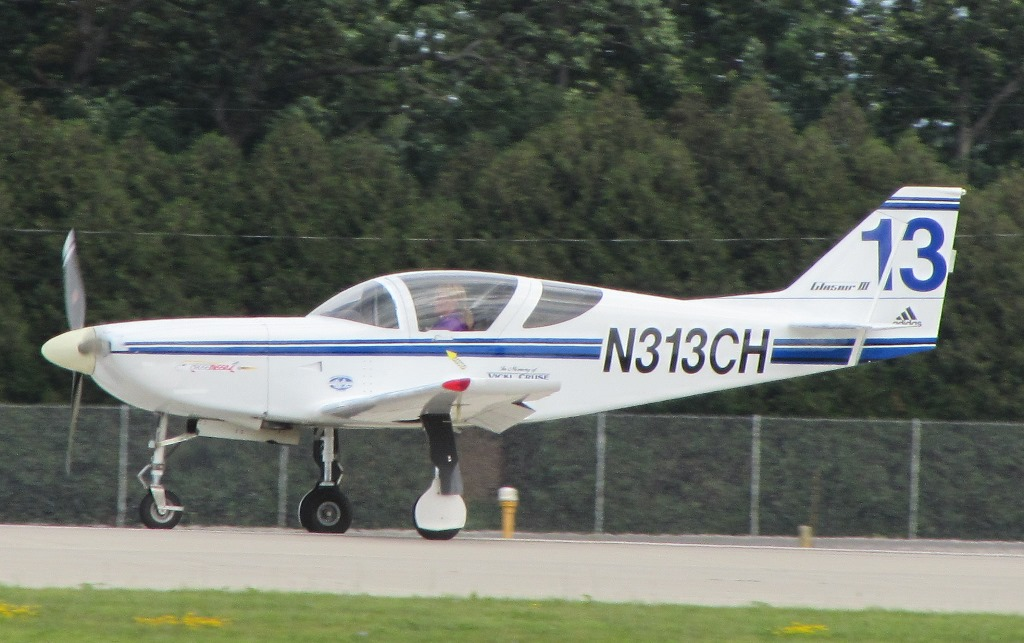
Glasair III landing

== Design and development ==
The Glasair III is an all-composite cantilever low-wing monoplane. It is an improved variant of the earlier Glasair II with a retractable landing gear and powered by a 300 hp (224 kW) Lycoming IO-540-K1H5 engine. It has two seats side-by-side with dual controls. The aircraft can be fitted with wing-tip fuel tanks. Since the purchase of Glasair II and III aircraft by Advanced Aero Components in September 2017, the Glasair II and III airframes have been substantially upgraded and are now reproduced in all-carbon-fiber construction. The kits have been rebranded as G2 Heritage and G3 Heritage.

== Specifications ==
Data from Jane's All the World's Aircraft 1989-90

General characteristics

- Crew: 1
- Capacity: 1 passenger
- Length: 21 ft 4 in (6.50 m)
- Wingspan: 23 ft 3 in (7.09 m)
- Height: 7 ft 2 in (2.18 m)
- Wing area: 81.3 sq ft (7.55 m^{2})
- Empty weight: 1,550 lb (703 kg)
- Max takeoff weight: 2,400 lb (1,089 kg)
- Powerplant: 1 × Lycoming IO-540-K1H5 , 300 hp (220 kW)

Performance

- Maximum speed: 290 mph (470 km/h, 250 kn) at sea level
- Cruise speed: 282 mph (454 km/h, 245 kn) at 8,000 ft (2,400 m) (75% power)
- Stall speed: 74 mph (119 km/h, 64 kn) (flaps and landing gear retracted)
- Range: 1,300 mi (2,100 km, 1,100 nmi) (standard fuel)
- Service ceiling: 24,000 ft (7,300 m)
- g limits: +6/-4
- Rate of climb: 2,400 ft/min (12 m/s)
