= Stoddard-Hamilton Aircraft =

- Founded: 1979
- Founder: Tom Hamilton
- Fate: Defunct in 2001
- Successor: Glasair Aviation
- Headquarters: Arlington, Washington, United States
- Products: Composite kit aircraft

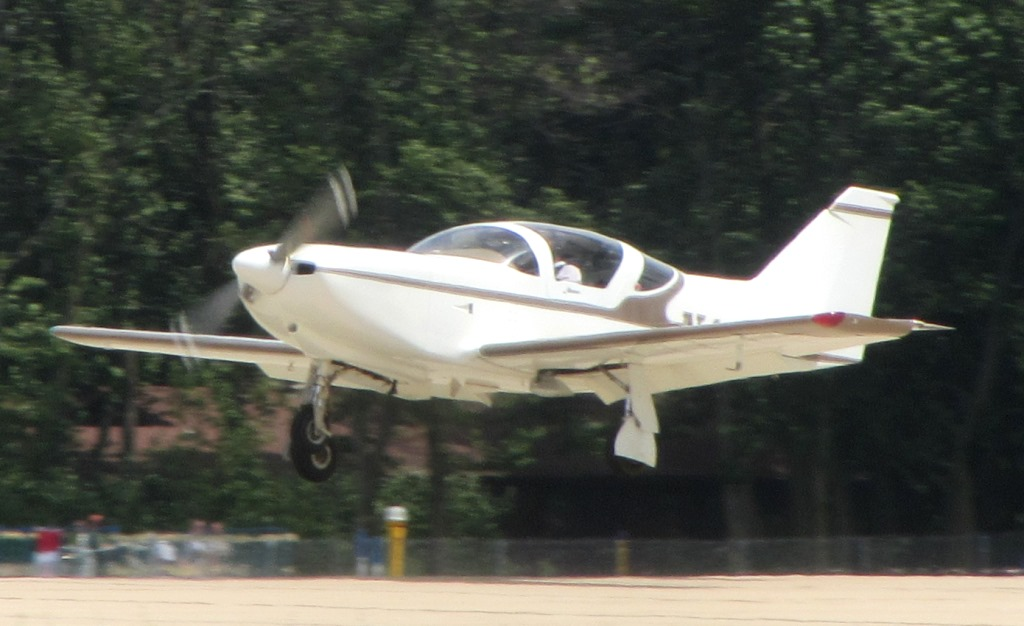
Stoddard-Hamilton Glasair II, first flown in 1989

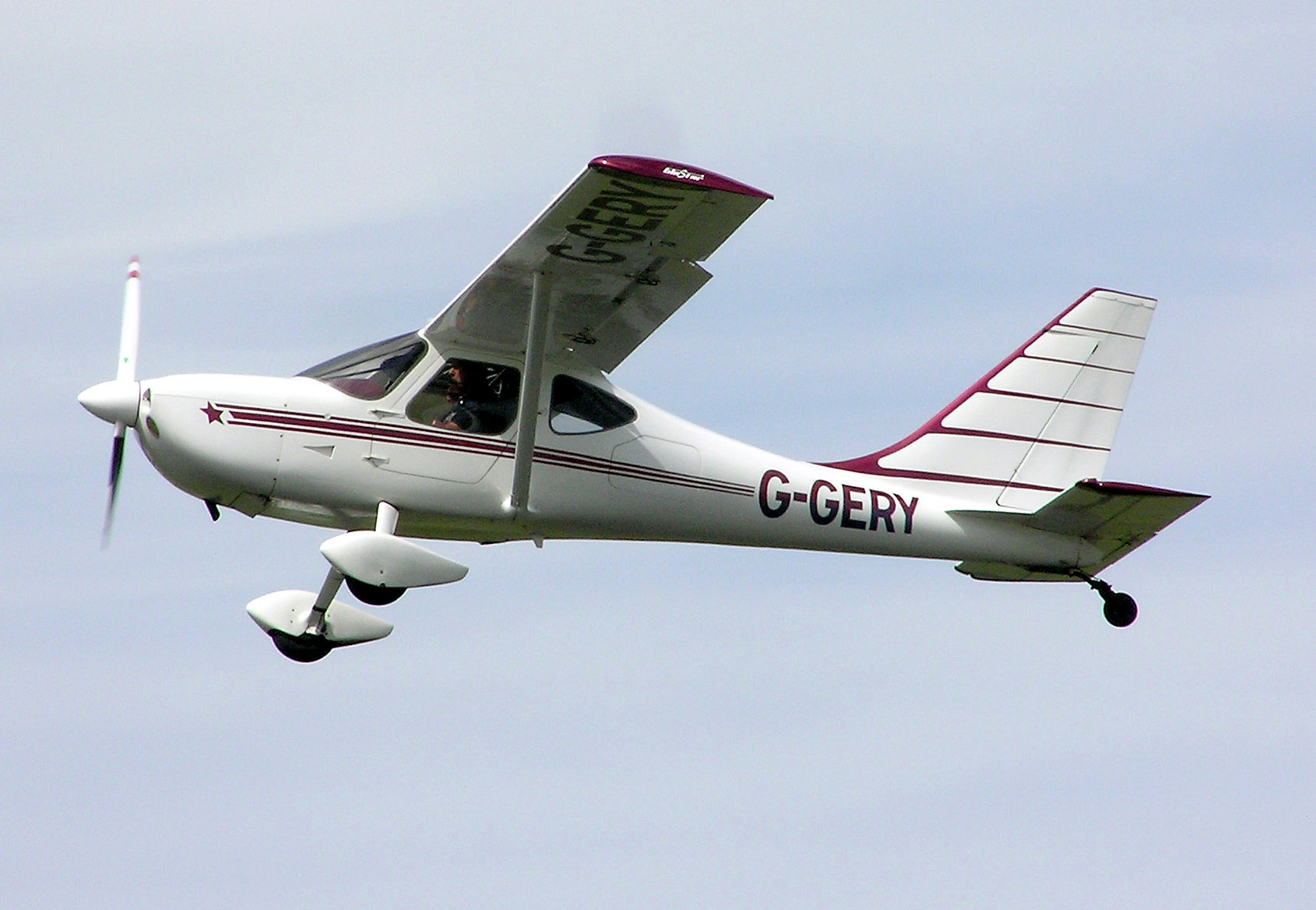
1994 Stoddard-Hamilton Glastar

Stoddard-Hamilton Aircraft, based in Arlington, Washington, was a designer and supplier of high-performance homebuilt aircraft kits, offering parts and plans to homebuilders. The company's popular Glasair aircraft series are low wing, two-seat (side by side) fiberglass designs.

The Glasair TD of 1979 was the first pre-molded composite aircraft kit on the general aviation market, introduced at the 1980 EAA Oshkosh Airshow. The company was started by Tom Hamilton and named, tongue in cheek, after the style of large aircraft manufacturers in the United States. Using Hamilton's middle and last name, the company was incorporated as Stoddard-Hamilton.

Retractable gear and up-engined models were later introduced, with the Glasair III Turbo capable of speeds in excess of 300 mph (483 km/h), and another model being fitted with a turboprop engine. In the mid-1990s, Glasair introduced the Glastar, a high-wing, short-field capable utility aircraft with two seats.

In 2001, Thomas W. Wathen purchased the assets of the Glasair from bankrupt Stoddard-Hamilton Aircraft. He combined New Glasair LLC with New GlaStar LLC and continued production of the Glasair and GlaStar kits at the Arlington factory, marketing them under the Glasair Aviation name.

== Aircraft ==
- SH-1 Prototype
- Glasair I
- Glasair II
- Glasair III
- Glastar
- T-9 Stalker
