= Pusher configuration =

Air- or watercraft design in which the propulsion device is behind the engine

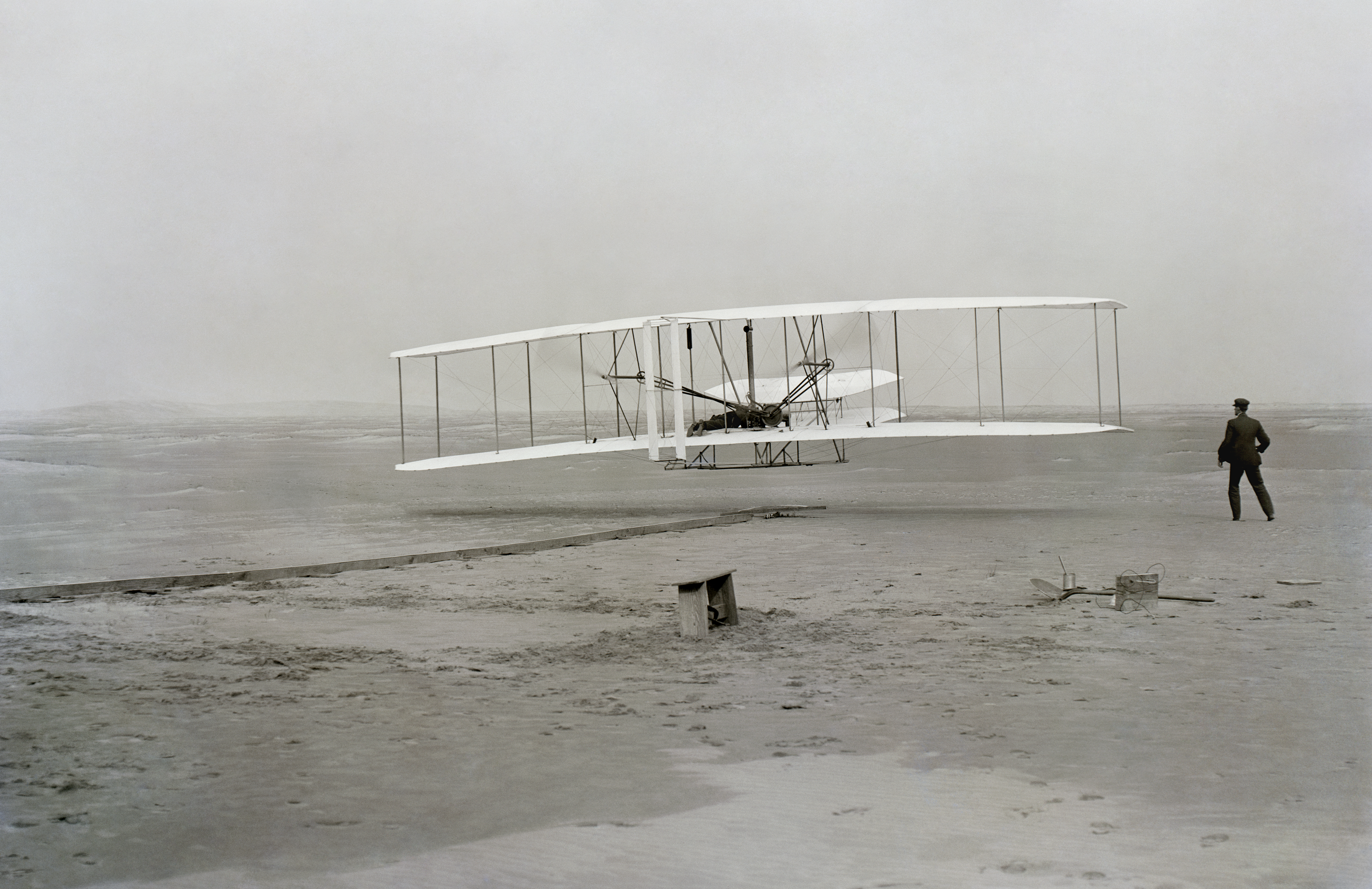
The Wright Flyer, a “pusher” aircraft designed in 1903

In aeronautical and naval engineering, pusher configuration is the term used to describe a drivetrain of air- or watercraft with propulsion device(s) after the engine(s). Amongst aircraft, the more conventional design is the tractor configuration, which places them in front.

Though the term is most commonly applied to aircraft, its most ubiquitous propeller example is a common outboard motor for a small boat.

“Pusher configuration” describes the specific (propeller or ducted fan) thrust device attached to a craft, either aerostats (airship) or aerodynes (aircraft, WIG, paramotor, rotorcraft) or others types such as hovercraft, airboats, and propeller-driven snowmobiles.

== History ==
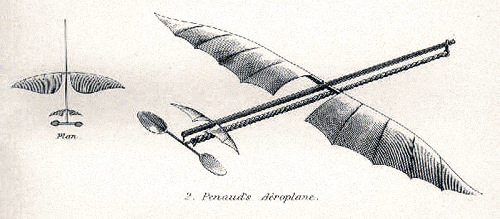
1871 Planophore

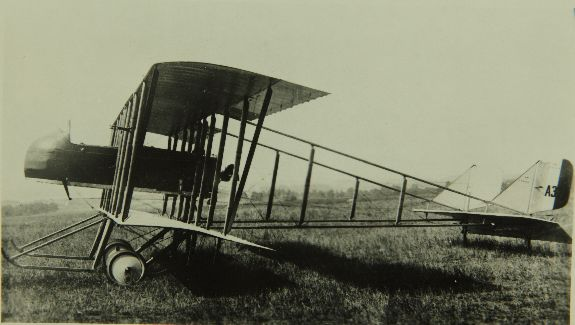
A Farman MF.11, showing the classic Farman configuration with engine between tail booms

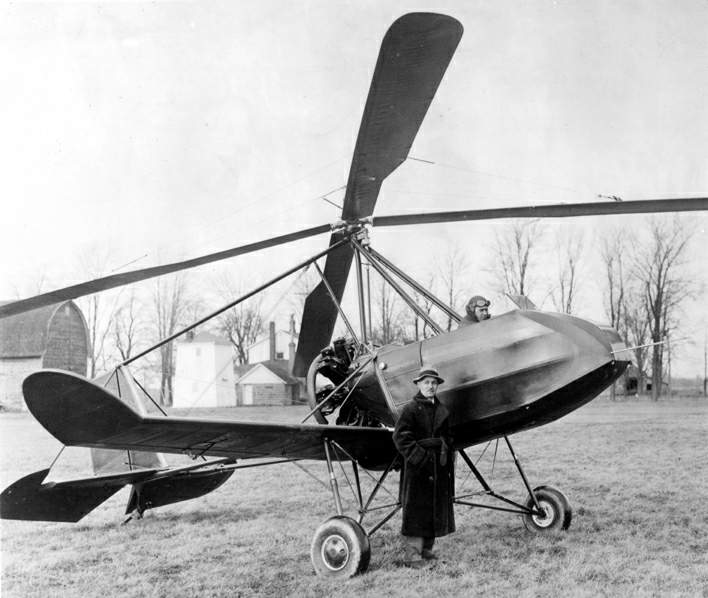
Buhl A-1 Autogyro, the first pusher autogyro

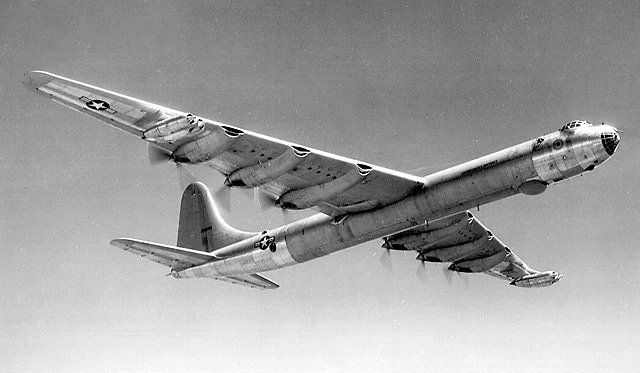
The post-WWII Convair B-36 was unusual in its size, era, number of engines, and combining both propeller and jet propulsion, with six radial piston and four jet engines

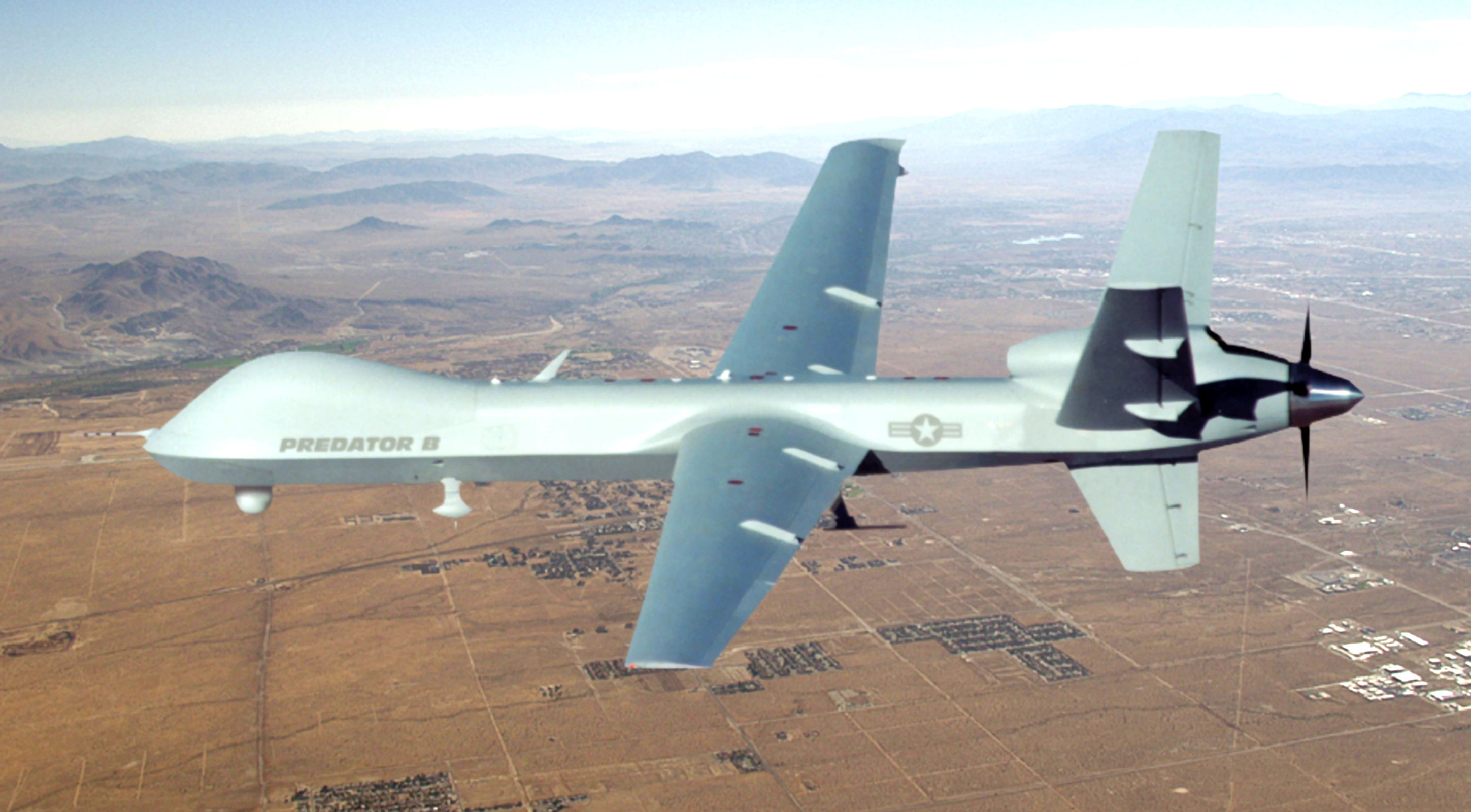
Typical of many UAVs, the General Atomics MQ-9 Reaper has a propeller at the extreme tail

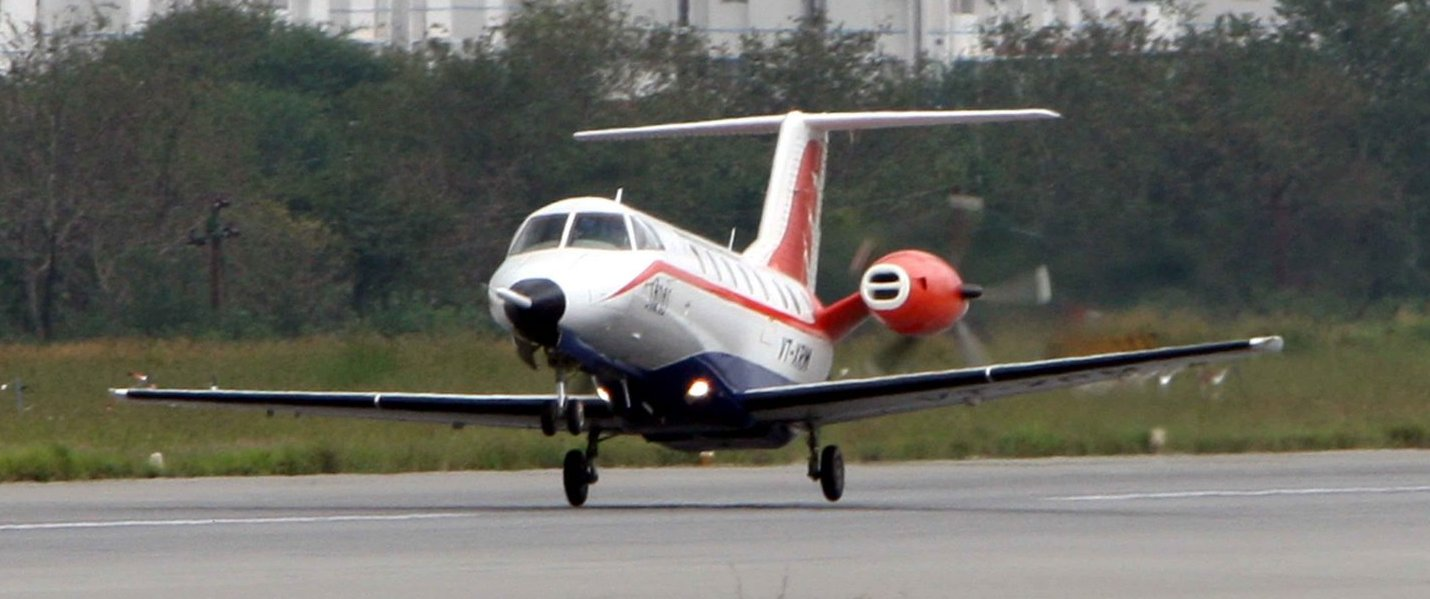
NAL Saras, with pushers mounted on pods on either side of the rear fuselage

The rubber-powered "Planophore", designed by Alphonse Pénaud in 1871, was an early successful model aircraft with a pusher propeller.

Many early aircraft (especially biplanes) were "pushers", including the Wright Flyer (1903), the Santos-Dumont 14-bis (1906), the Voisin-Farman I (1907), and the Curtiss Model D used by Eugene Ely for the first ship landing on January 18, 1911. Henri Farman's pusher Farman III and its successors were so influential in Britain that pushers in general became known as the "Farman type". (Note: The Royal Aircraft Factory referred to all the early pushers they built as Farman Experimentals - or F.E.s.) Other early pusher configurations were variations on this theme.

The classic "Farman" pusher had the propeller "mounted (just) behind the main lifting surface" with the engine fixed to the lower wing or between the wings, immediately forward of the propeller in a stub fuselage (that also contained the pilot) called a nacelle. The main difficulty with this type of pusher design was attaching the tail (empennage). This needed to be in the same general location as on a tractor aircraft, but its support structure had to avoid the propeller.

The earliest examples of pushers relied on a canard but this has serious aerodynamic implications that the early designers were unable to resolve. Typically, mounting the tail was done with a complex wire-braced framework that created a lot of drag. Well before the beginning of the First World War, this drag was recognized as just one of the factors that would ensure that a Farman-style pusher would have an inferior performance to an otherwise similar tractor type.

The U.S. Army banned pusher aircraft in late 1914 after several pilots died in crashes of aircraft of this type, so from about 1912 onwards, the great majority of new U.S. landplane designs were tractor biplanes, with pushers of all types becoming regarded as old-fashioned on both sides of the Atlantic. However, new pusher designs continued to be designed right up to the armistice, such as the Vickers Vampire, although few entered service after 1916.

At least up to the end of 1916, however, pushers (such as the Airco DH.2 fighter) were still favored as gun-carrying aircraft by the British Royal Flying Corps, because a forward-firing gun could be used without being obstructed by the arc of the propeller. With the successful introduction of Fokker's mechanism for synchronizing the firing of a machine gun with the blades of a moving propeller, followed quickly by the widespread adoption of synchronization gears by all the combatants in 1916 and 1917, the tractor configuration became almost universally favored, and pushers were reduced to the tiny minority of new aircraft designs that had a specific reason for using the arrangement.

Both the British and French continued to use pusher-configured bombers, though there was no clear preference either way until 1917. Such aircraft included (apart from the products of the Farman company) the Voisin bombers (3,200 built), the Vickers F.B.5 "Gunbus", and the Royal Aircraft Factory F.E.2; however, even these found themselves being shunted into training roles before disappearing entirely. Possibly the last fighter to use the Farman pusher configuration was the 1931 Vickers Type 161 COW gun fighter.

During the long eclipse of the configuration the use of pusher propellers continued in aircraft which derived a small benefit from the installation and could have been built as tractors. Biplane flying boats had for some time often been fitted with engines located above the fuselage to offer maximum clearance from the water, often driving pusher propellers to avoid spray and the hazards involved by keeping them well clear of the cockpit. The Supermarine Walrus was a late example of this layout.

The so-called push/pull layout, combining the tractor and pusher configurations—that is, with one or more propellers facing forward and one or more others facing back—was another idea that continues to be used from time to time as a means of reducing the asymmetric effects of an outboard engine failure, such as on the Farman F.222, but at the cost of a severely reduced efficiency on the rear propellers, which were often smaller and attached to lower-powered engines as a result.

By the late 1930s, the widespread adoption of all-metal stressed skin construction of aircraft meant, at least in theory, that the aerodynamic penalties that had limited the performance of pushers (and indeed any unconventional layout) were reduced; however, any improvement that boosts pusher performance also boosts the performance of conventional aircraft, and they remained a rarity in operational service—so the gap was narrowed but was closed entirely.

During World War II, experiments were conducted with pusher fighters by most of the major powers. Difficulties remained, particularly that a pilot having to bail out of a pusher was liable to pass through the propeller arc. This meant that of all the types concerned, only the relatively conventional Swedish SAAB 21 of 1943 went into series production. Other problems related to the aerodynamics of canard layouts, which had been used on most of the pushers, proved more difficult to resolve. (Note: See stability issues of the Curtiss-Wright XP-55 Ascender) One of the world's first ejection seats was (per force) designed for this aircraft, which later re-emerged with a jet engine.

The largest pusher aircraft to fly was the Convair B-36 "Peacemaker" of 1946, which was also the largest bomber ever operated by the United States. It had six 3,800 hp (2,800 kW) 28-cylinder Pratt & Whitney Wasp Major radial engines mounted in the wing, each driving a pusher propeller located behind the trailing edge of the wing, plus four jet engines.

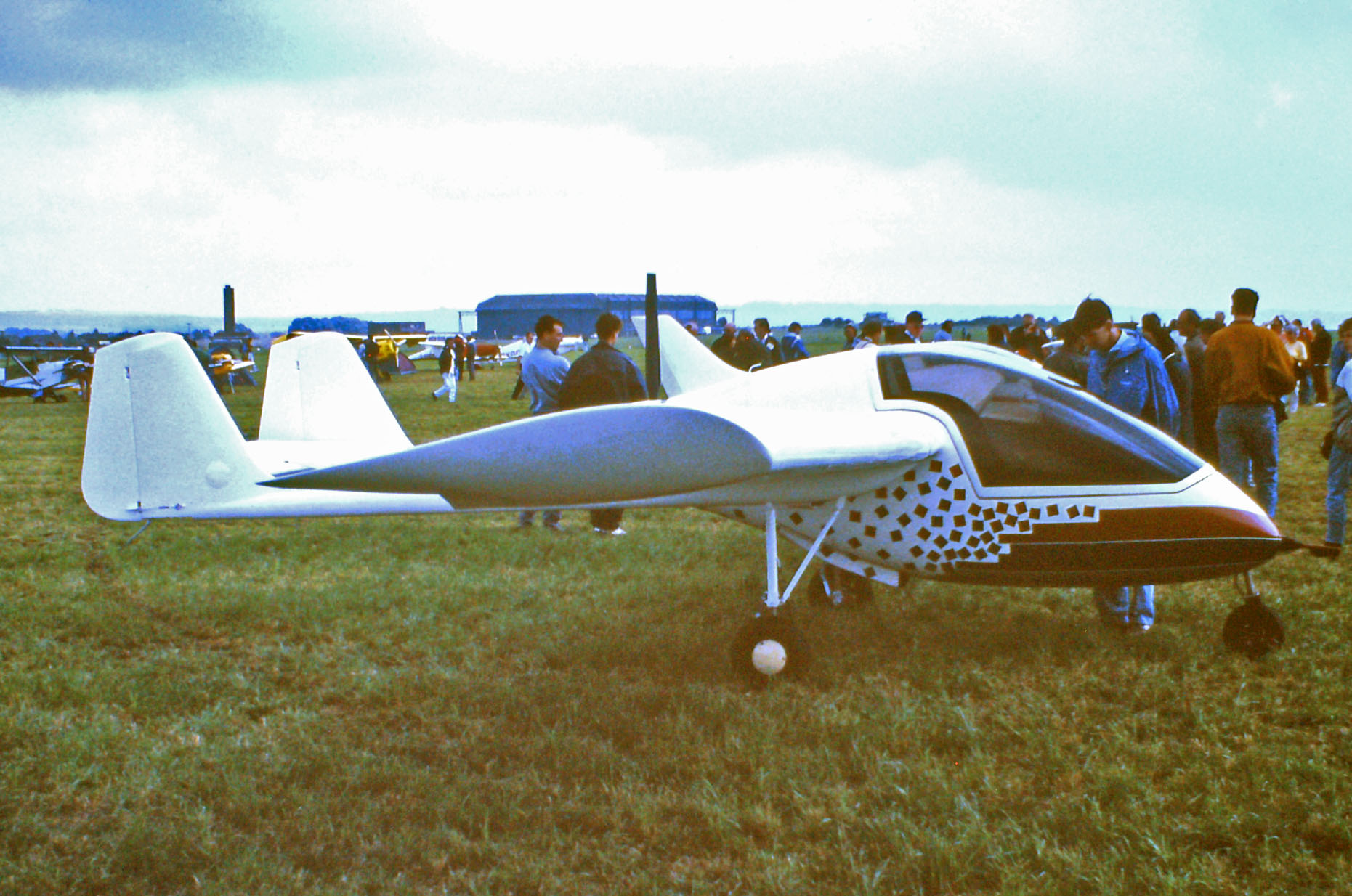
Aero Dynamics Sparrow Hawk II

Although the vast majority of propeller-driven aircraft continue to use a tractor configuration, there has been in recent years something of a revival of interest in pusher designs: in light homebuilt aircraft such as Burt Rutan's canard designs since 1975, ultralights such as the Quad City Challenger (1983), flexwings, paramotors, powered parachutes, and autogyros. The configuration is also often used for unmanned aerial vehicles, due to requirements for a forward fuselage free of any engine interference.

The Aero Dynamics Sparrow Hawk was another homebuilt aircraft constructed chiefly in the 1990s.

== Configurations ==
Airships are the oldest type of pusher aircraft, going back to Frenchman Henri Giffard's pioneering airship of 1852.

Pusher aircraft have been built in many different configurations. In the vast majority of fixed-wing aircraft, the propeller or propellers are still located just behind the trailing edge of the "main lifting surface", or below the wing (paramotors) with the engine being located behind the crew position.

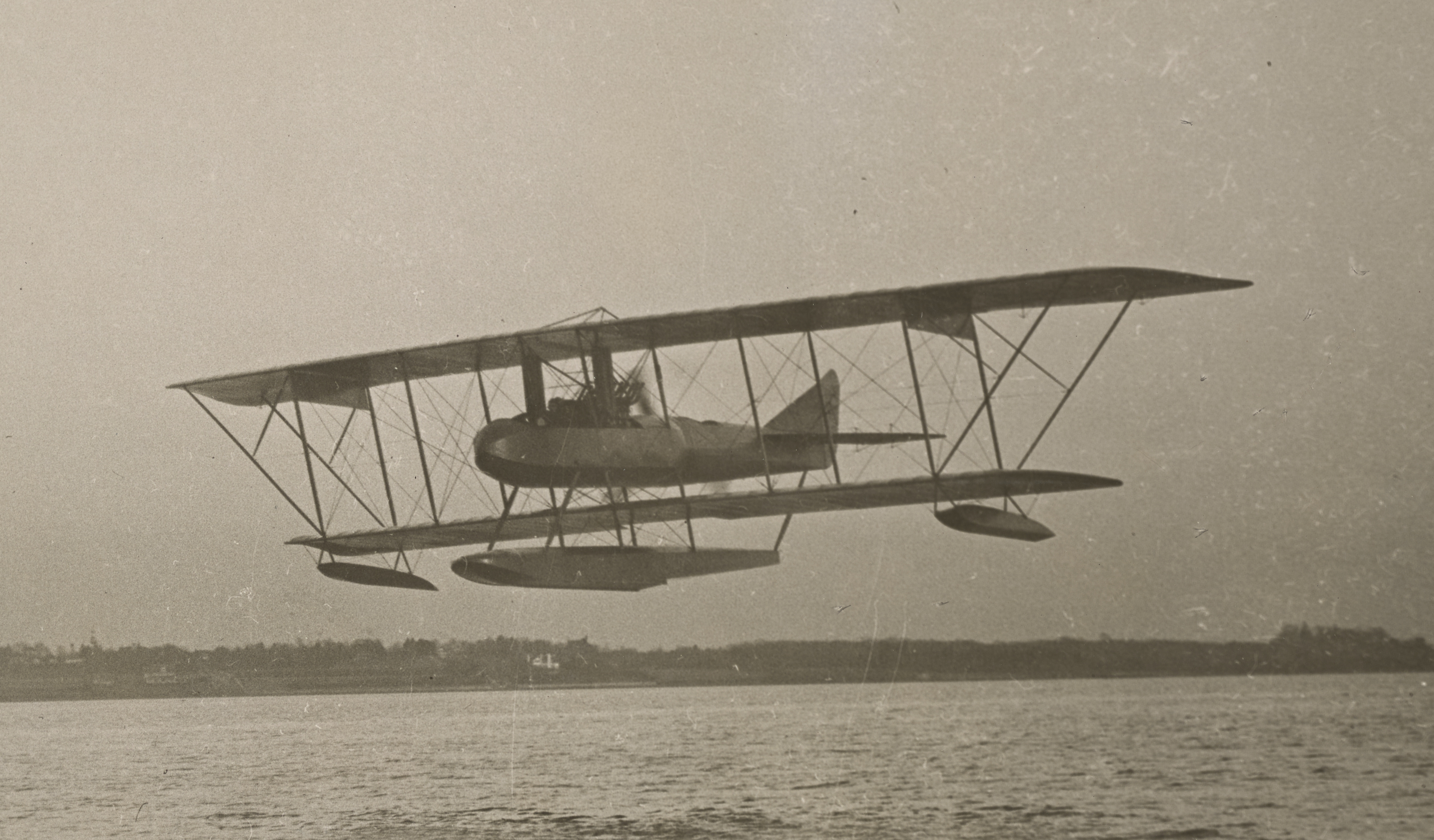
Gallaudet D-4 with pusher prop rotating around the rear fuselage

Conventional aircraft layout have a tail (empennage) for stabilization and control. The propeller may be close to the engine, as the usual direct drive:

- The propeller may be ahead of the tail: inside the framework (Farman III), in line with the fuselage (RFB Fantrainer), between tail booms (Cessna Skymaster), above the fuselage on wing (Quad City Challenger), on nacelle or axial pod (Lake Buccaneer), or coaxially around rear fuselage (Gallaudet D-4).
- The propeller may be located behind the vertical tail, under the horizontal tail (Prescott Pusher).
- Engines and propellers may be located on wings (Piaggio P.180 Avanti) or on lateral pods (Embraer/FMA CBA 123 Vector).

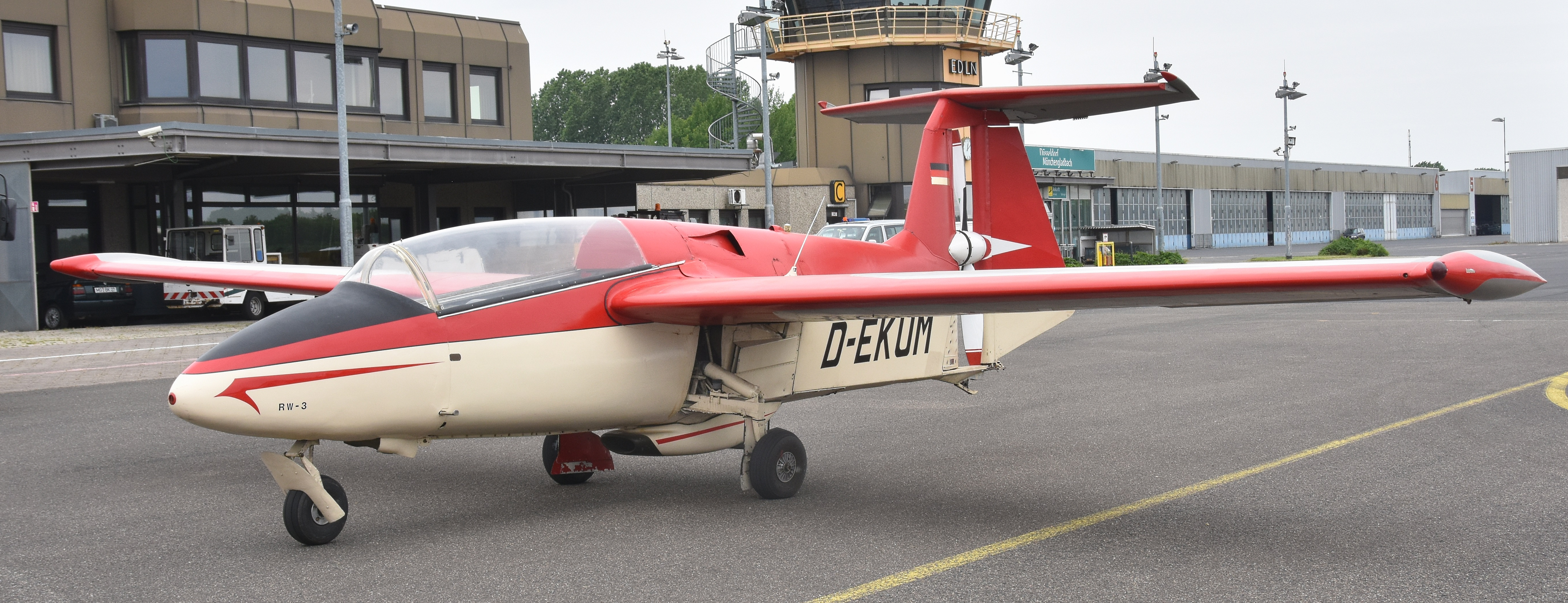
Rhein Flugzeugbau RW 3 Multoplan with propeller between the rudder and the fin

The engine may be buried in a forward remote location, driving the propeller by drive shaft or belt:

- The propeller may be located ahead of the tail, behind the wing (Eipper Quicksilver) or inside the airframe (Rhein Flugzeugbau RW 3 Multoplan).
- The propeller may be located inside the tail, either cruciform or ducted fan (Marvelette).
- The propeller may be located at the rear, behind a conventional tail (Bede BD-5).
- The propeller may be located above the fuselage such as on many small flying boats (Lake Buccaneer)

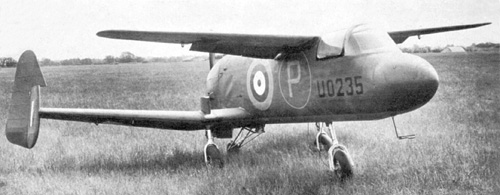
Progenitor to a large number of canard pushers, the experimental Miles M.35 Libellula had its engine at the rear of the fuselage

In canard designs a smaller wing is sited forward of the aircraft's main wing. This class mainly uses a direct drive, (Note: An exception is the Raptor Aircraft Raptor whose Audi V6 diesel engine drives the propeller via PRSU belts.) either single-engine axial propeller, (Note: Canard aircraft: wartime Curtiss-Wright XP-55 Ascender and Japanese Kyushu J7W (with a drive shaft), Ambrosini SS.4; Rutan VariEze and Long-EZ, AASI Jetcruzer) or twin engines with a symmetrical layout, (Note: Canard symmetrical layout: Wright Flyer, Beechcraft Starship) or an in line layout (push-pull) as the Rutan Voyager.

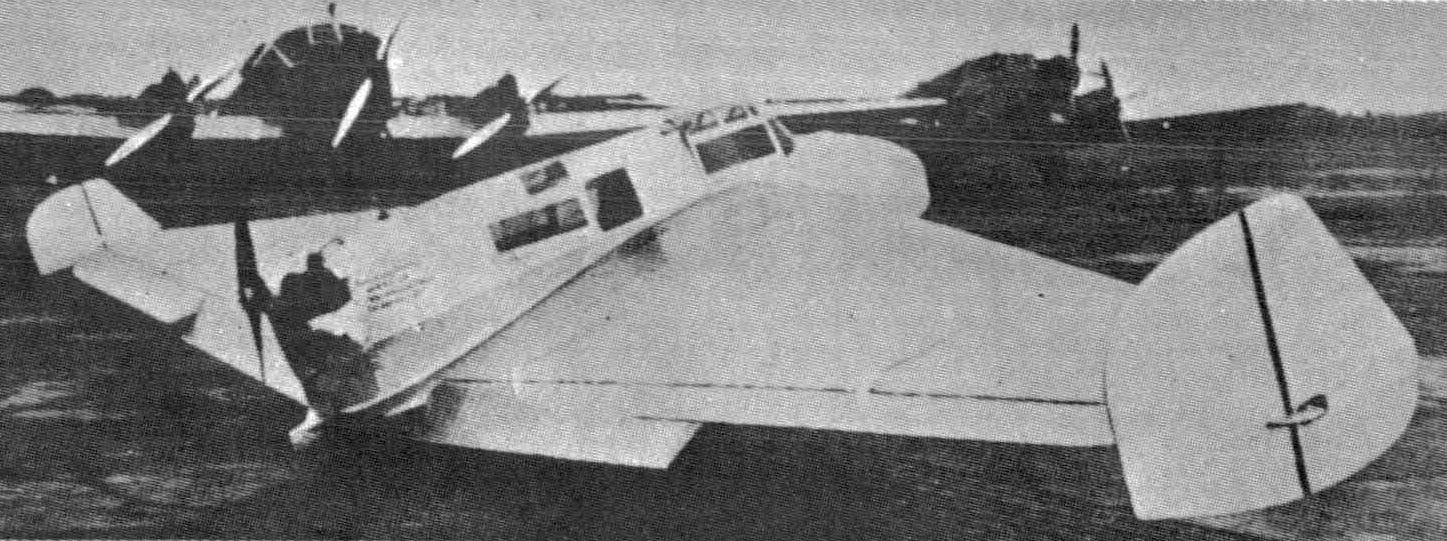
Lippisch Delta 1 tailless pusher

In tailless aircraft such as Lippisch Delta 1 and Westland-Hill Pterodactyl types I and IV, horizontal stabilizers at the rear of the aircraft are absent. Flying wings like the Northrop YB-35 are tailless aircraft without a distinct fuselage. In these installations, the engines are either mounted in nacelles or the fuselage on tailless aircraft, or buried in the wing on flying wings, driving propellers behind the trailing edge of the wing, often by extension shaft.

Almost without exception, flexwing aircraft, paramotors, and powered parachutes use a pusher configuration.

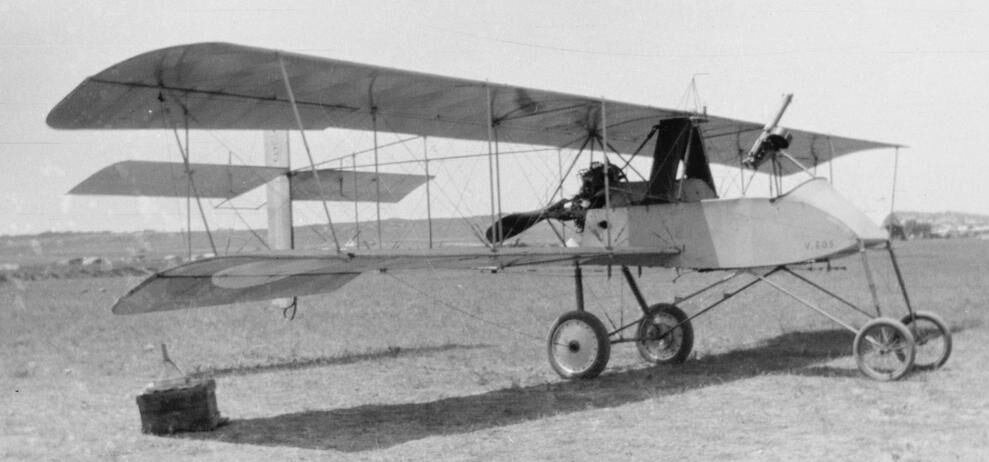
Voisin III bomber, the most numerous pusher design, with 3200 built

Other craft with pusher configurations run on flat surfaces, land, water, snow, or ice. Thrust is provided by propellers and ducted fans, located to the rear of the vehicle. These include:

- Hovercraft, lifted by an air cushion, such as the 58-passenger SR.N6.
- Airboats, flat bottomed vessels planing on water.
- Aerosledges, also known as the aerosleigh, propeller-driven sledge, or propeller-driven snowmobile.
- The Schienenzeppelin, an experimental high speed train powered by a pusher propeller.

== In aircraft ==
=== Advantages ===
The drive shaft of a pusher engine is in compression in normal operation, which places less stress on it than being in tension in a tractor configuration.

==== Practical requirements ====
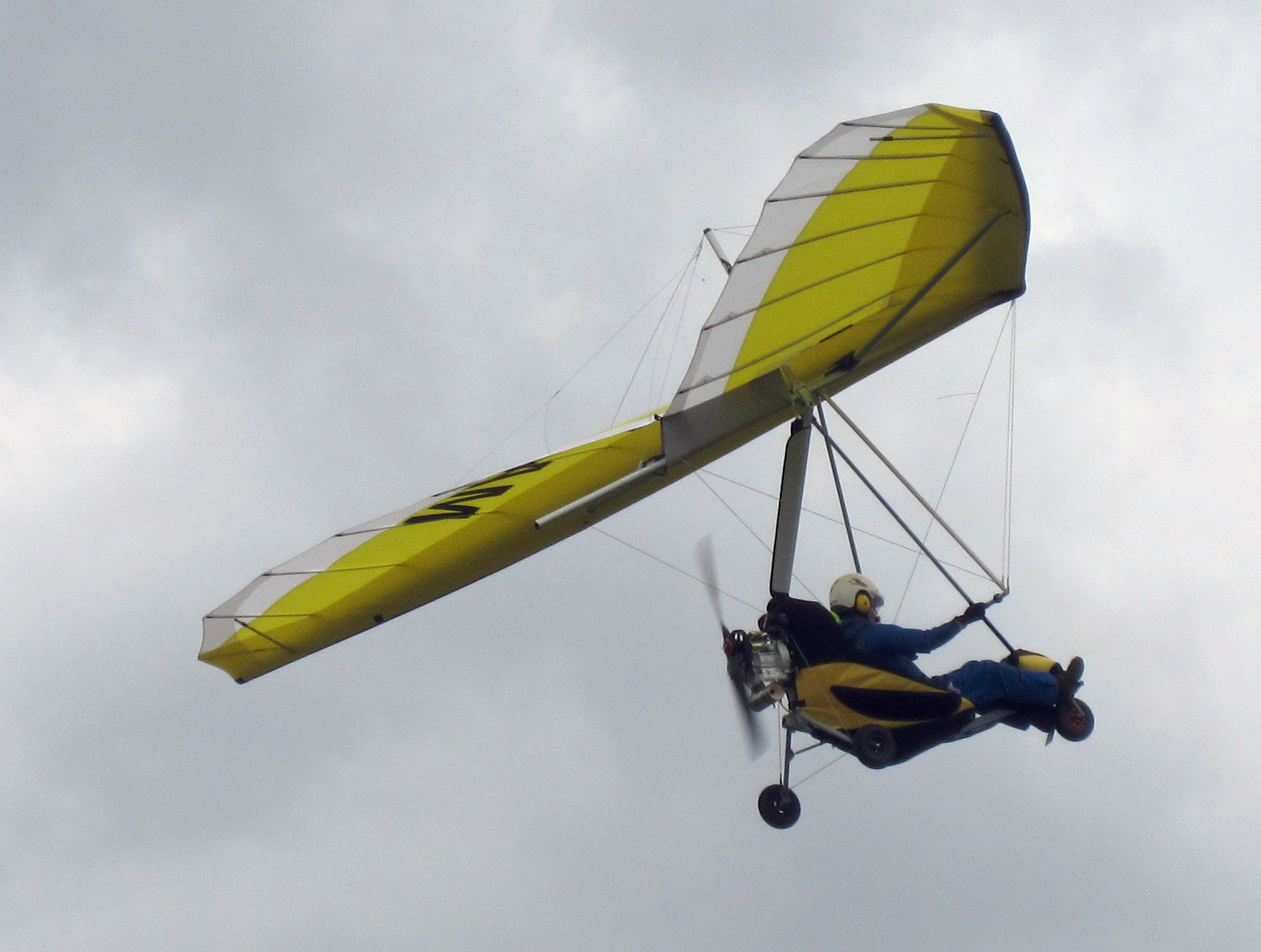
Flexwing microlight with engine and propeller at the pilot's back

Placing the cockpit forward of the wing to balance the weight of the engine(s) aft improves visibility for the crew. In military aircraft, front armament could be used more easily on account of the gun not needing to synchronize itself with the propeller, although the risk that spent casings fly into the props at the back somewhat offset this advantage.

Aircraft where the engine is carried by, or very close to, the pilot (such as paramotors, powered parachutes, autogyros, and flexwing trikes) place the engine behind the pilot to minimize the danger to the pilot's arms and legs. These two factors mean that this configuration was widely used for early combat aircraft, and remains popular today among ultralight aircraft, unmanned aerial vehicles (UAVs), and radio-controlled airplanes.

==== Aerodynamics ====
A pusher may have a shorter fuselage and hence a reduction in both fuselage wetted area and weight.

In contrast to tractor layout, a pusher propeller at the end of the fuselage is stabilizing. A pusher needs less stabilizing vertical tail area and hence presents less weathercock effect; at takeoff roll, it is generally less sensitive to crosswind. (Note: Because of less weathercock stability)

When there is no tail within the slipstream, unlike a tractor, there is no rotating propwash around the fuselage inducing a side force to the fin. At takeoff, a canard pusher pilot does not have to apply rudder input to balance this moment.

Efficiency can be gained by mounting a propeller behind the fuselage, because it re-energizes the boundary layer developed on the body, and reduces the form drag by keeping the flow attached to the fuselage. However, it is usually a minor gain compared to the airframe's detrimental effect on propeller efficiency.

Wing profile drag may be reduced due to the absence of prop-wash over any section of the wing.

==== Safety ====
The engine is mounted behind the crew and passenger compartments, so fuel oil and coolant leaks will vent behind the aircraft, and any engine fire will be directed behind the aircraft. Similarly, propeller failure is less likely to directly endanger the crew.

A pusher ducted fan system offers a supplementary safety feature attributed to enclosing the rotating fan in the duct, therefore making it an attractive option for various advanced UAV configurations or for small/personal air vehicles or for aircraft models.

=== Disadvantages ===
==== Structural and weight considerations ====
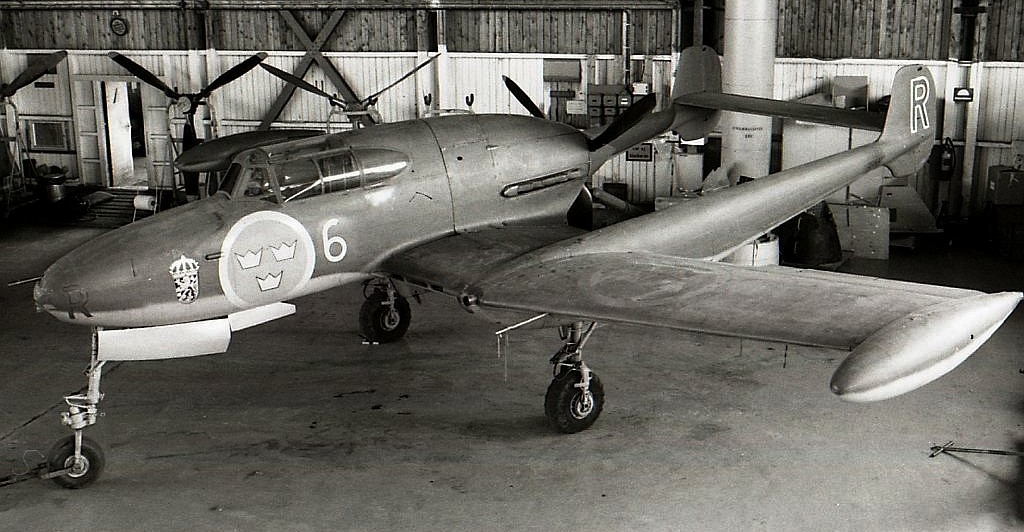
SAAB J 21 fighter, with the pusher propeller mounted between two fuselage booms

A pusher design with an empennage behind the propeller is structurally more complex than a similar tractor type. The increased weight and drag degrades performance compared with a similar tractor type. Modern aerodynamic knowledge and construction methods may reduce but never eliminate the difference. A remote or buried engine requires a drive shaft and associated bearings, supports, and torsional vibration control, and adds weight and complexity.

==== Center of gravity and landing gear considerations ====
To maintain a safe center of gravity (CG) position, there is a limit to how far aft an engine can be installed. The forward location of the crew may balance the engine weight and will help determine the CG. As the CG location must be kept within defined limits for safe operation load distribution must be evaluated before each flight. (Note: In the case of the Cozy IV, a side-by-side four-seater, an absent copilot must be balanced with 20 kg (40 lb) in the nose of the aircraft (Cafe Aircraft Performance Report))

Due to a generally high thrust line needed for propeller ground clearance, negative (down) pitching moments, and in some cases the absence of prop-wash over the tail, a higher speed and a longer roll may be required for takeoff compared to tractor aircraft. The Rutan answer to this problem is to lower the nose of the aircraft at rest such that the empty center of gravity is then ahead of the main wheels. In autogyros, a high thrust line results in a control hazard known as power push-over.

==== Aerodynamic considerations ====
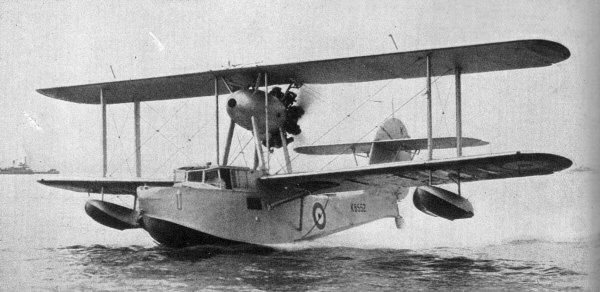
The Supermarine Walrus pusher flying boat is a typical flying boat, with the engine mounted high to avoid spray; however, throttle changes then induce pitch changes.

Due to the generally-high thrust line to ensure ground clearance, a low-wing pusher layout may suffer power-change-induced pitch changes, also known as pitch/power coupling. Pusher seaplanes with especially high thrust lines and tailwheels may find the vertical tail masked from the airflow, severely reducing control at low speeds, such as when taxiing. The absence of prop-wash over the wing reduces the lift and increases takeoff roll length. Pusher engines mounted on the wing may obstruct sections of the wing trailing edge, reducing the total width available for control surfaces such as flaps and ailerons. When a propeller is mounted in front of the tail, changes in engine power alter the airflow over the tail and can give strong pitch or yaw changes.

==== Propeller ground clearance and foreign object damage ====
Due to the pitch rotation at takeoff, the propeller diameter may have to be reduced (with a loss of efficiency) or landing gear made longer and heavier. Many pushers (Note: Dornier Do 335, LearAvia Lear Fan, Prescott Pusher, Grob GF 200, Beechcraft Starship, Vmax Probe) have ventral fins or skids beneath the propeller to prevent the propeller from striking the ground, at an added cost in drag and weight. On tailless pushers such as the Rutan Long-EZ, the propeller arc is very close to the ground while flying nose-high during takeoff or landing. Objects on the ground kicked up by the wheels can pass through the propeller disc, causing damage or accelerated wear to the blades; in extreme cases, the blades may strike the ground.

When an airplane flies in icing conditions, ice can accumulate on the wings. If an airplane with wing-mounted pusher engines experiences icing, the props will ingest shredded chunks of ice, endangering the propeller blades and parts of the airframe that can be struck by ice violently redirected by the props. In early pusher combat aircraft, spent ammunition casings caused similar problems, and devices for collecting them had to be devised.

==== Propeller efficiency and noise ====
The propeller passes through the fuselage wake, wing wake, and other flight surface downwashes—moving asymmetrically through a disk of irregular airspeed. This reduces propeller efficiency and causes vibration inducing structural propeller fatigue (Note: The only approved prop for the Rutan pushers is wood, which is more resistant to fatigue damage.) and noise.

Prop efficiency is usually at least 2–5% less and in some cases more than 15% less than an equivalent tractor installation. Full-scale wind tunnel investigation of the canard Rutan VariEze showed a propeller efficiency of 0.75 compared to 0.85 for a tractor configuration, a loss of 12%. Pusher props are noisy, and cabin noise may be higher than tractor equivalent (Cessna XMC vs Cessna 152). Propeller noise may increase because the engine exhaust flows through the props. This effect may be particularly pronounced when using turboprop engines due to the large volume of exhaust they produce.

==== Engine cooling and exhaust ====
Power-plant cooling design is more complex in pusher engines than for the tractor configuration, where the propeller forces air over the engine or radiator. Some aviation engines have experienced cooling problems when used as pushers. To counter this, auxiliary fans may be installed, adding additional weight. The engine of a pusher exhausts forward of the propeller, and in this case, the exhaust may contribute to corrosion or other damage to the propeller. This is usually minimal, and may be mainly visible in the form of soot stains on the blades.

==== Safety ====
===== Propeller =====
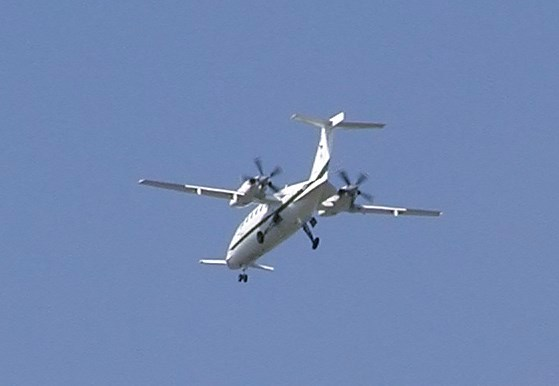
Piaggio P.180 Avanti with engines mounted on the wing trailing edge, away from passengers, allowing safer boarding.

In case of propeller/tail proximity, a blade break can hit the tail or produce destructive vibrations, leading to a loss of control.

Crew members risk striking the propeller while attempting to bail out of a single-engined airplane with a pusher prop. At least one early ejector seat was designed specifically to counter this risk. Some modern light aircraft include a parachute system that saves the entire aircraft, thus averting the need to bail out.

===== Engine =====
Engine location in the pusher configuration might endanger the aircraft's occupants in a crash or crash-landing in which engine momentum projects through the cabin. For example, with the engine placed directly behind the cabin, during a nose-on impact, the engine momentum may carry the engine through the firewall and cabin, and might injure some cabin occupants. (Note: Crash of Ambrosini SS.4)

===== Aircraft loading =====
Spinning propellers are always a hazard on ground working, such as loading or embarking the airplane. The tractor configuration leaves the rear of the plane as relatively safe working area, while a pusher is dangerous to approach from behind, while a spinning propeller may suck in things and people nearby in front of it with fatal results to both the plane and the people sucked in. Even more hazardous are unloading operations, especially mid-air, such as dropping supplies on parachute or skydiving operations, which are next to impossible with a pusher configuration airplane, especially if propellers are mounted on fuselage or sponsons.

== See also ==
- Ducted fan
- List of pusher aircraft by configuration
- List of pusher aircraft by configuration and date
