= Gallaudet Hydroplane =

Gallaudet hydroplane

General information
- National origin: United States of America
- Manufacturer: Gallaudet Aircraft Corporation
- Designer: Edson Fessenden Gallaudet, H.A. Lewis

The Gallaudet Hydroplane (a.k.a. Gallaudet Wing-Warping Kite or Hydro-Bike) is an early aircraft employing the use of wing-warping for roll control.

== Development ==
The Gallaudet Hydroplane was built in Norwich, Connecticut, by Edson Fessenden Gallaudet. The principle of wing-warping was independently applied to this kite/aircraft/glider several years before the Wright Brothers applied it to their Wright Flyer. (along with Jean-Marie LeBris, John J. Montgomery, Clement Ader, D.D. Wells, and Hugo Mattullath). The Wrights later applied for a patent on wing-warping, which led to the widespread use of the aileron control method to avoid the Wright's airplane patents. Gallaudet generically employed the name hydroplane to many of his future seaplane designs. In 1908, Gallaudet would form the Gallaudet Engineering Company, (later the Gallaudet Aircraft Corporation). Later hydroplane models were built for the United States Navy.

== Design ==
The 1897 Gallaudet Hydroplane glider featured twin floats, a central pyramidal support frame, and flexible wooden wing ribs (employing wing warping) with fabric-covering.

In 1913, Gallaudet filed U.S. Patent# 1,214,536 for the Hydroplane. The single-place open cockpit aircraft featured most of the engine enclosed in the fuselage. The fuselage tapered upwards to the rear with a small attached rudder. A single landing wheel protruded partially from the center of the fuselage for ground landings.

== Operational history ==
The Gallaudet Hydroplane was on display at the East Hall of the Arts and Industries Building of the Smithsonian Museum.

Test flights for later hydroplanes built for U.S. Navy acceptance were performed at Gales Ferry, Connecticut in 1916.

== Specifications (Hydroplane) ==
Data from Smithsonian

General characteristics

- Length: 7 ft (2.1 m)
- Wingspan: 11 ft 6 in (3.51 m)
- Height: 5 ft 6 in (1.68 m)
- Gross weight: 25 lb (11 kg)

Performance

== See also ==
Related development

- Gallaudet D-4
