= Gallaudet D-1 =

1916 American biplane observation aircraft

D-1
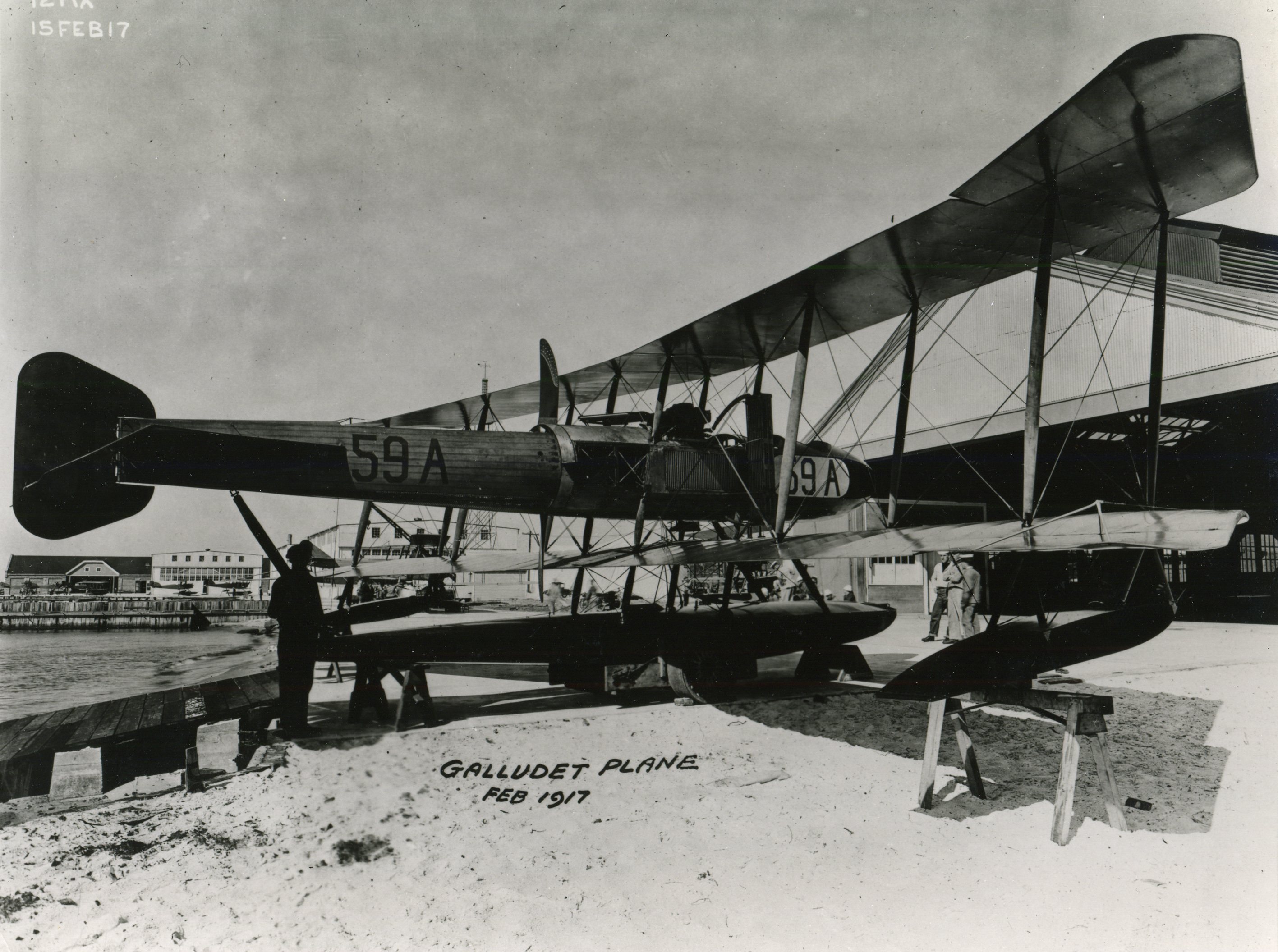
- D-1 at Naval Air Station Pensacola, Florida, 15 February 1917

General information
- Type: Observation aircraft
- Manufacturer: Gallaudet Aircraft Company
- Designer: Edson Gallaudet
- Number built: 1 prototype

History
- First flight: 17 July 1916
- Developed into: Gallaudet D-2

The Gallaudet D-1 was a prototype American biplane observation aircraft built by the Gallaudet Aircraft Company during World War I for the United States Navy. Completed in mid-1916, its manufacturer's flight testing was delayed by damage suffered during the tests, shortages of qualified pilots and the weather; the D-1 could not conduct its service flight testing until early 1917. The Navy found the aircraft only suitable for limited duties and operated it for several months before returning it to the factory later that year to have its deficiencies remedied. This was done, but the D-1 was never reassembled for unknown reasons and it was scrapped after the war.

== Background and description ==
The D-1 was designed to meet a requirement for a two-seat, twin-float, twin-engined biplane for maritime-patrol duties issued by the United States Navy in February 1915. Edson Gallaudet, chief designer for the Gallaudet Aircraft Company, submitted a design on 4 June using his revolutionary "Gallaudet Drive" in which the propeller revolved around a hub buried in the middle of the fuselage. The Navy accepted the bid despite Gallaudet's submission being the most expensive and awarded the company a contract on 2 September with delivery to follow in six months. One reason that the Navy ordered the aircraft was that it wished to evaluate Gallaudet's novel propulsion configuration and to see how well it took off in rough water.

The D-1 was a two-bay, staggered-wing biplane with the fuselage suspended between the wings by cabane struts. The aircraft had two cockpits in the nose with the observer seated in front of the pilot. The structure of the fuselage forward of the engines was wooden and was covered by mahogany plywood in contrast to the rear fuselage which was probably built up from steel tubing covered by fabric. The engine bay was covered with aluminum panels and the rear fuselage was generally covered in fabric. The design of the tail structure and its control surfaces was derived from that of the earlier Gallaudet Model C, although the D-1 lacked a fixed vertical stabilizer as Gallaudet believed that the large area of the rear fuselage was sufficient to provide enough lateral stability.

The two-spar wings were swept backwards 8.5° and were built in three sections from steel tubing. Both wings were fitted with ailerons, but these only moved upwards. The large central float was attached to the bottom of the lower wing and to the fuselage with struts and bracing wires. The smaller floats near the wing tips used inverted V-struts. All three floats were covered with mahogany plywood. The main float was subdivided into numerous water-tight compartments, some of which contained fuel. A small rudder was fitted to the central float to allow the aircraft to maneuver on the water.

Gallaudet's initial proposal was intended to use a pair of 110-horsepower (82 kW) engines, probably the Gyro Duplex Model L rotary engine, (Note: The engines likely would have been mounted transversely with their output shafts facing each other.) but this was changed during the design process to a pair of water-cooled, straight-four Duesenberg engines, side-by-side in the center fuselage. Each engine developed about 150 horsepower (110 kW) and they were clutched together to drive the four-bladed wooden propeller built by the American Propeller Manufacturing Company. The propeller was mounted on a ring gear which rotated around a fixed hub that connected the forward and rear fuselages. The prominent engine exhaust pipes were on the tops of the engines and curved outwards. Outboard of each engine was a radiator covered by louvers in the aluminum side panels. The hot air from the engine bay was dumped overboard thorough a perforated aluminum panel on the underside of the rear fuselage. Preliminary flight testing revealed that this cooling system was inadequate and a pair of large vertical external radiators were added to the sides of the fuselage in front of the exhausts. In addition, the panels over the top of the engine bay were removed.

== Development and testing ==
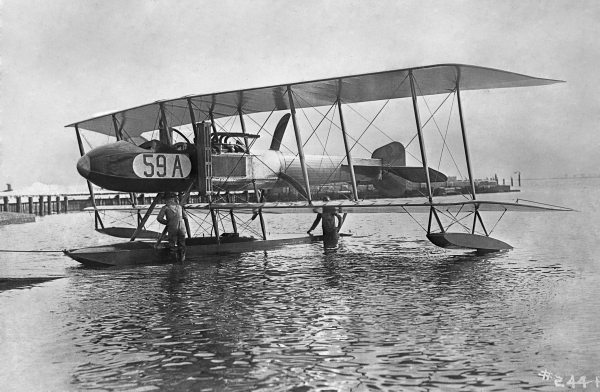
A forward oblique view of the D-1 at Pensacola, giving a clear view of the vertical and fuselage radiators

Construction of the aircraft proceeded on schedule, but the Duesenberg engines were not delivered until February–March 1916, and Gallaudet received a two-month extension from the Navy. The D-1 was completed sometime in late April or early May 1916, but without a pilot experienced with floatplanes available, only taxiing tests could be initially conducted. These were enough to reveal the cooling problems, and the external radiators had to be ordered. Before these arrived, Gallaudet finally found a qualified pilot, and the aircraft made its first flight on 17 July. Several flights were made that day until a small hole was punched in the central float that developed enough water pressure to blow off some of its upper decking; repairs took until early August. A new pilot had to be hired to continue flight testing who landed the D-1 with such force on 3 August that the forward struts securing the float to the fuselage buckled which caused it to drop onto the float, damaging its upper deck and breaking the plywood skin of the fuselage. Neither the engines nor the propeller were damaged, and Gallaudet estimated that three weeks would be needed to make the required repairs.

When the repairs were completed on 23 August, no qualified pilots were available; a request for a Navy pilot by Gallaudet was either ignored or refused as the aircraft was not flown again until early October when the company was able to hire Flip Bjorklund, a test pilot who had flown other Gallaudet aircraft previously. Captain Mark Bristol, commander of the armored cruiser USS North Carolina, the first American ship equipped to operate seaplanes, arranged to inspect the aircraft and watch some demonstration flights on 16 October. Bristol was impressed with its performance and requested that the Chief of Naval Operations assign the D-1 to his ship after it had passed its acceptance trials so his aviators could thoroughly evaluate its handling qualities on the water and gain experience with high-performance seaplanes. Bjorklund was forced to make an emergency landing due to engine problems two days later, but a passing motorboat was able to tow the aircraft back to its base.

The engine problems proved more intractable than anticipated, despite the addition of new water manifolds for the cylinder heads to improve cooling. They did not arrive until 12 November and could not be flight tested until 22 November. During these flights, the engines started back-firing despite the best efforts of a Duesenberg factory mechanic. Bad weather prevented any further flight testing, and the company's lease on its factory had expired, so Gallaudet requested that he be allowed to ship the D-1 to Naval Aeronautic Station in Pensacola, Florida, where the company could finish its preliminary trials in better weather and the Navy could conduct its acceptance trials. The Navy agreed, and the aircraft and several company mechanics arrived in Pensacola on 10 January 1917. The D-1 was put through its trials two weeks later and was accepted by the Navy, albeit with serious reservations. The Navy's Board of Inspection, which included pilots Holden Richardson and Marc Mitscher, had serious reservations about the aileron control system, coupled with the small size of the ailerons and their one-directional movement, providing insufficient lateral control for the aircraft. Another issue was marginal buoyancy, even at 4,600 pounds (2,100 kg), much less the specified gross weight of 5,117 pounds (2,321 kg). These problems caused the Board to forgo several of the required tests for safety reasons.

The Board of Inspection concluded that the D-1 was "not considered safe or useful for general purposes because of its excessive wing loading and inadequate lateral control", but that "it was suitable for advanced training and machine-gun tests because of the forward cockpit arrangements for a gunner; that flights should be restricted to harbors and not the open sea". Based on the Board's recommendations, the Bureau of Construction and Repair advised the Chief of Naval Operations that the original contract specifications appeared impossible to meet and that the contract penalties for failing to comply with them be waived in light of the experimental nature of the aircraft.

== Service ==
Documentation on the activities of the D-1 is fragmentary at best. It appears to have been assigned to the armored cruiser Huntington on 23 June 1917, which had been modified to serve as a seaplane tender earlier that year, but it is not mentioned in the ship's log book. The ship's captain had little interest in aviation and did very little with the aircraft aboard his ship.

Gallaudet had received a contract to rectify the shortcomings of the D-1 and the company was notified that the Navy had dispatched the disassembled aircraft to the factory via rail on 1 August. It finally arrived there in late September or early October in damaged condition. Lengthening the upper wings by 17 feet (5.2 m), thus adding 170 square feet (15.8 m^{2}) of surface area, was done to alleviate the excessive wing loading, and lateral control was improved by removing the ailerons on lower wings and enlarging the ones on the upper wings. New, lighter, radiators were installed and the main float was enlarged to increase buoyancy. Duesenberg had offered to supply two new engines, which had been received by early December. The company reported that the D-1 was ready to be assembled on 18 December, but it requested that that be delayed until the ice had melted.

The Bureau of Steam Engineering requested that one of the engines be transferred for use in a training school in early 1918. By April, the Navy ordered that the D-1 be assembled, apparently unaware that one of the engines had been transferred from the factory. The company was able to secure a replacement, but the aircraft was apparently never completely assembled for whatever reason, as a mid-1918 photograph shows the fuselage in storage at the factory. After the war, the aircraft was stricken from the navy list on 10 July 1919 and was undoubtedly scrapped.

== Specifications ==
Data from The Gallaudet Story: Part 8B: The D-1 Hydroplane for the Army; American Military Aircraft, 1908–1919

General characteristics

- Crew: 2
- Length: 33 ft (10 m)
- Upper wingspan: 48 ft (15 m)
- Height: 13 ft (4.0 m)
- Wing area: 658 sq ft (61.1 m^{2})
- Empty weight: 3,600 lb (1,633 kg)
- Gross weight: 4,604 lb (2,088 kg)
- Powerplant: 2 × Duesenberg water-cooled, straight 4 piston engines, 150 hp (110 kW) each
- Propellers: 4-bladed fixed-pitch propeller, 9 ft 6 in (2.90 m) diameter

Performance

- Maximum speed: 91 mph (146 km/h, 79 kn)
- Endurance: 4 hours (at full speed)
- Time to altitude: 5 minutes to 900 ft (270 m)
- Wing loading: 7.7 lb/sq ft (38 kg/m^{2})

== Bibliography ==
- Casari, Robert B. (2014). American MIlitary Aircraft 1908–1919. n.p.: Aeronaut Books. ISBN 978-1-935881-13-1.
- Gordon, Robert (August 2004). "The Gallaudet Story: Part 8A: The D-1 Hydroplane for the Navy". WWI Aero: The Journal of the Early Aeroplane (185): 30–45. ISSN 0736-198X.
- Gordon, Robert (November 2004). "The Gallaudet Story: Part 8B: The D-1 Hydroplane for the Navy". WWI Aero: The Journal of the Early Aeroplane (186): 12–21. ISSN 0736-198X.
- von Deurs, George (2016) [1966]. Wings for the Fleet: A Narrative of Naval Aviation's Early Development, 1910–1916. Annapolis, Maryland: Naval Institute Press. ISBN 978-1-68247-143-2.
