= Chepiwanoxet Point =

Neighborhood in Warwick, Rhode Island, US

Coordinates: 41°40′24″N 71°26′30″W

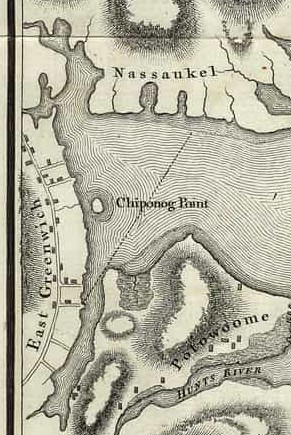
Western Greenwich Bay, an arm of Narragansett Bay showing Chepiwanoxet (Chiponog) Point as an island in 1777

Chepiwanoxet is a neighborhood in Warwick, Rhode Island, with an island peninsula in Greenwich Bay, an arm of Narragansett Bay. The neighborhood straddles the Amtrak railroad lines, which lies just east of and parallel to the Post Road (US Route 1). Its boundaries are Neptune Street to the North, Alger Avenue to the South, Post Road to the West, and Greenwich Bay to the East. Chepiwanoxet Way, an underpass beneath the Amtrak lines, now serves as the only street access in and out of the neighborhood.

Native Americans, who fished its island and shores, named this area between Post Road and Greenwich Bay "Chepiwanoxet." Settled as a colonial farm in early 18th century, it became a beach resort with hotel and shore dinner hall after the Chepiwanoxet railroad station opened in around 1837. Small lots were sold for summer cottages to upstate residents and for homes to workers in nearby Cowesett Hill Estates in late 19th century. Before World War I, the Gallaudet Aircraft Company built a causeway to the island for its seaplane factory. The Chepiwanoxet entrance sign states that Warwick bought the island in 1994 for a city park.

== Name ==
Chepiwanoxet, known also in earlier sources, such as A Key into the Language of America as Chepinoxet, is a Narragansett word. It may be derived from chepi 'separated,' -wan (particle) -ok 'little' -sett 'place', meaning perhaps 'Little Separated Place,' or possibly 'Little Place at the Northeast,' compare chepewéssin 'northeast wind.'

Chepiwanoxet Alternate Names: Chepi, Devil's Island, Gallaudet Seaplane Factory

== Geology ==
Chepiwanoxet is underlaid by sedimentary rocks of the Coal Age (Pennsylvanian period, about 300 million years old). This rock formation is 60 miles (97 km) long, extending from Hanover, Massachusetts, south to the mouth of Narragansett Bay, and 18 miles (29 km) wide from Providence to Fall River. It underlies the entire Narragansett Bay, including the Providence River, Greenwich Bay, Fall River, the Sakonnet River, plus both East and West passages out to the ocean. Chepiwanoxet and East Greenwich are just inside the western edge of the Rhode Island formation.

The new Bedrock Geologic Map of Rhode Island gives more details of what underlies the unconsolidated surface material. Chepiwanoxet sits atop the western edge of the Rhode Island Formation of the stratified Narragansett Bay Group of the Pennsylvanian period (between 323 and 290 million years ago). The Narragansett Bay Group rocks are part of the Esmond-Dedham subterrane of the Southeastern New England Avalon zone. Uphill from the Post Road (US Route 1) is the boundary between the Rhode Island Formation and the older Scituate Igneous Suite (granite and diorite/gabbro rock) of the Devonian period (408 to 362 million years ago), which extends westward to the Connecticut border.

The real beginning of Chepiwanoxet Island came as a result of the last great ice sheets, which bulldozed rock and stone from Canada to Rhode Island. Along the way, each glacier gouged up billions of cubic meters of underlying bedrock, and then ground local and imported rocks together, creating much of the glacial deposits existing today. When the Earth's temperature rose about 10,000 to 12,000 years ago, the glaciers began melting faster than they were moving forward leaving huge deposits of sand and feeding many rivers and streams that rose sea level and washed sand into the coves and bays. For extended periods, the ice advance equaled the rate of melt, and piles of sediment were deposited in terminal or end moraines, such as on Block Island and in Charlestown (hills in the southern part of the state).

The Soil Survey of Rhode Island lists Chepiwanoxet Point and nearby shores as "Hinckley gravelly sandy loam"; a very porous, well-drained soil of glacial origin, which is of poor topsoil quality. The soil type change (to a bit of "Walpole sandy loam", associated with severe wetness) can only occur in the marsh.

== Island creation theory ==
The original island was created as an outwash deposit during a brief pause in the last glacial retreat from melt water runoff carrying eroded sand down a stream from the high hills (Love Lane and Cowesett Hills area) forming a small navigable river mouth called Arnold's Cove suitable only by skiffs and small sailboats (cc. 1800s). The island's tidal flow between Greenwich Cove to the South and Chepiwanoxet Beach to the North kept the small cove open with a navigable channel for small boat use more so at high tide and presumably good shellfishing in low tide.

Early bay navigation charts (e.g. 1777 Charles Blaskowitz; US Geological Survey 1891 Atlas of Rhode Island; ca. 1895 Narragansett Bay) and city maps (1831 Stevens map of Warwick) clearly show Chepiwanoxet as an island separated by water from the mainland.

A causeway built by the Gallaudet Aircraft Company (1916) allowed truck access to the island for building a seaplane manufacturing factory. Arnold Cove today is a silted in marsh with only a narrow, winding channel, exiting North toward Chepiwanoxet Beach that is no longer navigable. The cove is quickly being populated by Phragmites reed grass, an invasive species that can grow over 15' high and quickly crowds out natural habitats. If uncontrolled Phragmites may totally fill the entire cove in several decades.

The shore along Chepiwanoxet once was one long winding sandy beach continually fed by erosion of the many high hills along the bays West coast. But with development by railroad and home shore erosion protection with rock rip-rap, stone and cement walls that virtually stopped beach nourishment. Chepiwanoxet's beaches are mostly eroded away leaving rocky shores with sand stripped away by naturally occurring long-shore currents moving South and East north of the island and North and East south of the island. The two currents, along with Arnold Cove's river deposits, helped add sand to create the island along with its two long shallow sandbars heading Northeast and Southeast.

== Modern History ==
The triangular shaped island became a peninsula in the early 20th century when the Gallaudet Aircraft Company constructed America's first seaplane-only factory at Chepiwanoxet in 1916. To allow truck access to the factory, the south channel to Greenwich Cove filled in with sandy gravel dumped into the marsh, making a causeway from Alger Avenue that still remains. As a result of blocking water circulation around the island, Arnold Cove lost its small boat access from silt deposits in the tidal marsh located on the North side of the island. With the island made of glacial outwash sand deposits it remains subject to shore erosion. The Gallaudet Company built wood bulkheads around the North, East and South shores with rock rip-rap on the waterside and fill behind. With many factory workers living north of the old cove, a narrow wood plank bridge was built across the marsh to allow quicker access to/from work.

During the Gallaudet Factory period, the Bostitch Corporation, located in East Greenwich, was allowed to dump hundreds of truckloads of waste metal staples along the east facing shore behind the wood bulkhead to control erosion from the 1930s to the early 1950s. The staples rusted in large heaps that gradually were eroded/dissolved by the salt water. In the early 2000s after becoming a city park, Warwick had most of the remaining rust piles removed, but beach walkers can still discover small rust pieces lying about which locals jokingly call "Bostaplite" rock. A few wood piles remain widely scattered along the shore showing how much sand has eroded particularly in the north-east corner popular with fishermen.

The factory built seaplanes, including the Gallaudet 'Battlecruiser' D series for the U.S. Navy during World War I. Following the war in 1923, the corporation was sold and became part of Consolidated Aircraft Company, leaving its factory empty and virtually unused through World War II into the mid-1940s. Currently all the factory buildings have been demolished, but two cement floors remain with the larger floor of the metal boiler plant and the smaller floor, a bit to the Northwest, was the brick kiln for drying wood for the seaplanes. That floor has a brick border showing where the building walls surrounded the kiln.

In 1946 the Amtrol Company started on Chepiwanoxet Island by the brothers Chester and Kenneth Kirk. The factory manufactured water pressure control tanks in one of the empty seaplane buildings. They worked there until 1954 when Hurricane Carol hit Rhode Island and flooded the factory grounds. The company immediately moved their manufacturing to higher ground in West Warwick.

A few years after Hurricane Carol, the Chepiwanoxet Marina was built along the south shore of the island bordering the Gallaudet wood shore wall, and using a large single floor surviving building for boat inside winter storage. Its wood piers and floating docks pointed south into Greenwich Cove, a few wood piles remain. This was the first marina in Rhode Island, unlike most others was not converted from a boatyard, but built specifically for pleasure craft. The marina lasted less than 10 years.

In 1994 the island was purchased by the City of Warwick as the Chepiwanoxet Park and is open to the public, but with limited parking for about 8 cars. Visitors can walk the shore especially when below high tide, or along several sandy trails crossing the island. Shellfishing is allowed along the North and East facing sides on Greenwich Bay, but closed along the South shore facing Greenwich Cove.

== Geography ==
Chepiwanoxet Point is mapped on the East Greenwich 7.5-minute quadrangle. Bedrock and surficial geologic maps for the quadrangle were published by the U.S. Geological Survey and the Rhode Island State Geologist.
