= Prescott Pusher =

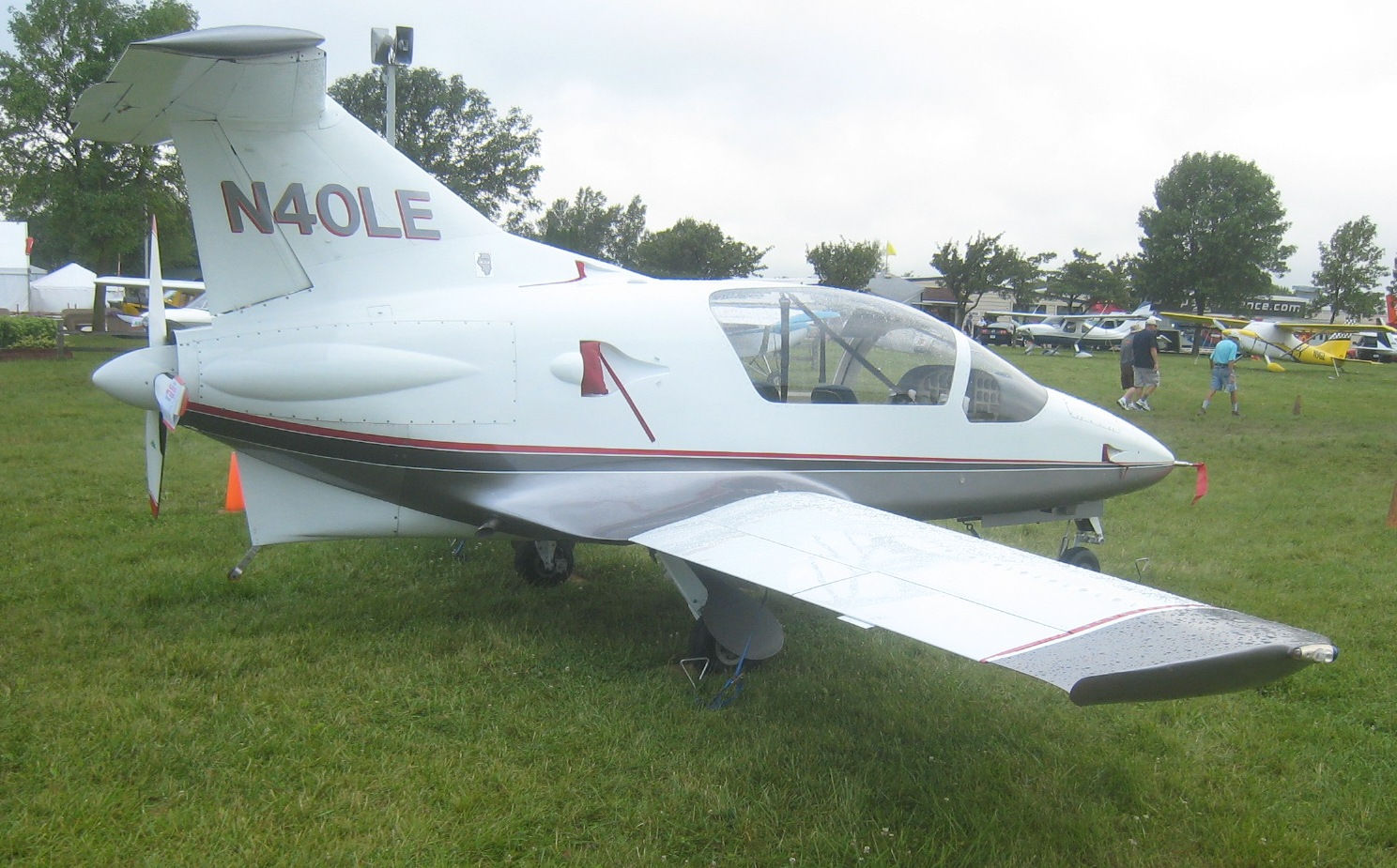
- Prescott Pusher

General information
- Type: Homebuilt aircraft
- National origin: United States
- Manufacturer: Prescott Aeronautical Corporation
- Designer: Tom Prescott

History
- First flight: 9 July 1985

The Prescott Pusher is an American, four-seat, pusher configuration homebuilt aircraft, with a large cockpit, retractable or fixed gear, and a T-tail. The pilot and passengers enter the aircraft through a large left-side clamshell door.

== Design and development ==
Company founder, Tom Prescott, worked for Sikorsky Aircraft, Piper Aircraft, and Learjet. He left Learjet in 1983 to produce the Prescott Pusher. It was tested using a 1/5 scale model in the Wichita State University wind tunnel in 1983. Flying scale models were tested in 1984, which led to the development of the drooped wing tips for better low speed handling and reduced drag. The aircraft was modeled using CAD/CAM software for creating drawings and defining machine cuts on the fuselage steel, becoming the first CAD/CAM designed homebuilt aircraft. The AVIA Products Co. was purchased to develop an electrically controlled variable pitch fiberglass pusher propeller.

The Prescott Pusher was designed to FAR Part 23 certification standards of the time. It uses aluminum construction for the wings and tail surfaces. The fiberglass landing gear and flaps are hydraulically activated. The nosegear steering is also hydraulic with electric controls. The fuselage uses a 4130 steel welded square steel tube frame with composite skin covering. Every component can be installed prior to skin installation, and in theory, could even be flown without the skins. The wing skins are formed cold using dry ice, then age hardened to T-42 standards. The engine is mounted far aft with a 12-inch propeller extension.

== Operational history ==
Prescott Aeronautical Corporation was founded by Tom Prescott in 1983. Prescott, who also served as company president, worked alongside Linden Blue investor and CEO, Les Jordan, head of marketing, and Steve Cain, head of public relations. The Prescott Pusher was first displayed at the Experimental Aircraft Association airshow in Oshkosh, Wisconsin in 1985. In 1989, having produced 68 kits, Prescott Aeronautical Corporation went out of business. By 1991, there were approximately 25–35 builders completing their aircraft in various configurations.

== Aircraft on display ==
- Kansas Aviation Museum

== Specifications ==
Data from Sport Aviation

General characteristics

- Crew: One (pilot)
- Capacity: Three passengers
- Length: 20 ft 3 in (6.17 m)
- Wingspan: 28 ft 5 in (8.66 m)
- Height: 8 ft 9 in (2.67 m)
- Wing area: 110 sq ft (10 m^{2})
- Aspect ratio: 7.3
- Airfoil: NLF(1)-0215
- Empty weight: 1,550 lb (703 kg)
- Gross weight: 2,400 lb (1,089 kg)
- Powerplant: 1 × Lycoming O-360 flat-four engine, 180 hp (130 kW)

Performance

- Cruise speed: 170 kn (190 mph, 310 km/h)
- Stall speed: 50 kn (58 mph, 93 km/h)
- Never exceed speed: 204 kn (235 mph, 378 km/h)
- Range: 870 nmi (1,000 mi, 1,600 km)
- Service ceiling: 18,000 ft (5,500 m)
- Rate of climb: 1,100 ft/min (5.6 m/s)
