= Gallaudet D-2 =

1917 American biplane observation aircraft

D-2
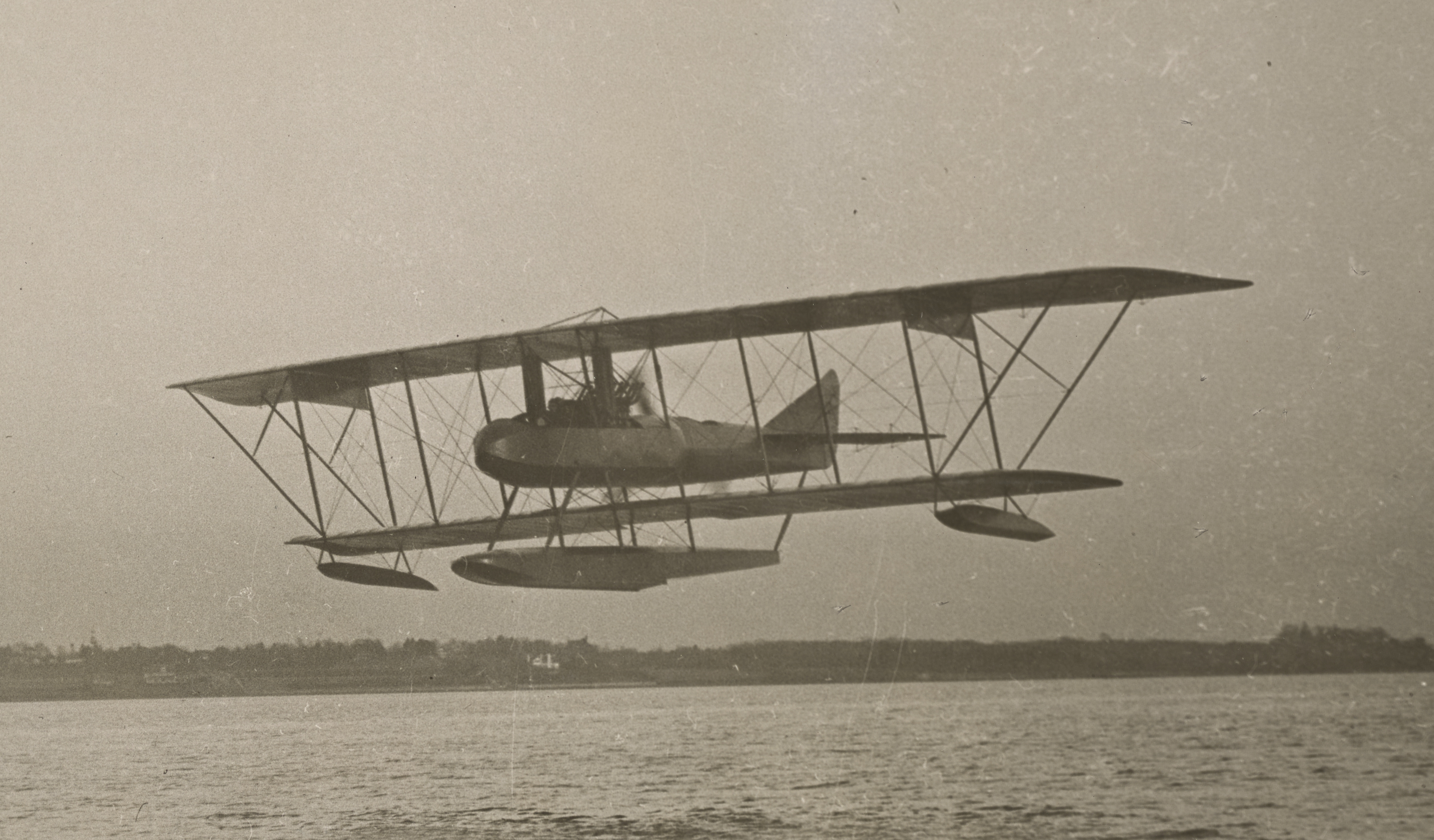
- D-2 #429 in flight, February 1918

General information
- Type: Observation aircraft
- Manufacturer: Gallaudet Aircraft Company
- Designer: Edson Gallaudet
- Number built: 3 prototypes

History
- First flight: October 1917
- Developed from: Gallaudet D-1

The Gallaudet D-2 was a prototype American biplane observation aircraft built by the Gallaudet Aircraft Company during World War I for the United States Army. Based on the earlier Gallaudet D-1, the D-2 had more powerful engines and had other improvements. The first prototype was completed in 1917, but crashed before it was accepted so Gallaudet had to build a replacement at its own expense. Two aircraft were completed in 1918, but further development ceased after the last one crashed with the death of the pilot, the first aviator to be killed in Rhode Island. All aircraft built or in the process of being constructed were subsequently scrapped.

== Background and description ==
The D-2 was designed to partially meet a requirement for a two-seat, twin-float, twin-engined biplane for maritime-patrol duties issued by the Aviation Section, U.S. Signal Corps in October 1916. Edson Gallaudet, chief designer for the Gallaudet Aircraft Company had submitted a design exactly meeting these requirements, but it had been rejected. The Aviation Section had been following the reports on the Gallaudet D-1 that had been ordered by the United States Navy, intrigued by its revolutionary "Gallaudet Drive" in which the propeller revolved around a hub buried in the middle of the fuselage. And when the D-1 passed its acceptance trials, the Aviation Section placed an order for four aircraft utilizing Gallaudet's propulsion configuration on 27 January 1917.

The D-2 was a two-bay, staggered-wing biplane with the fuselage suspended between the wings by cabane struts. Unlike the D-1, the aircraft had three cockpits, two in the nose and one aft of the engine for two observers and the pilot who was in the middle cockpit. The structure of the fuselage was built from steel tubing. Forward of the engine compartment, its sides were covered by mahogany plywood with the top and bottom covered by fabric. The engine bay had aluminum sheets all around, and the rear fuselage was covered in fabric. The outer structure of the fabric-skinned empennage and its control surfaces was also steel tubing, but the ribs and stringers were wooden.

The two-spar wings were swept backwards 8.5° outside the straight center sections. Outboard of the center sections, the upper wings consisted of three panels and the lower wings of two panels in a sesquiplane configuration. The wing spars were steel tubing and each panel had three wooden stringers. Unlike the D-1, only the upper wing was fitted with ailerons. The first D-2 prototype had fixed conventional landing gear that included a tailwheel at the extreme end of the fuselage. The telescopic legs for the main wheels were attached to the bottom of the forward wing spar and to the fuselage with V-struts and bracing wires. The contract required that the aircraft should also be able to be equipped with a large central float and two smaller ones near the wing tips.

The D-1 had been equipped with two 150-horsepower (110 kW) straight-four engines, but the first two D-2 prototypes were fitted with a pair of water-cooled, straight-six Hall-Scott A-5a engines, side-by-side in the center fuselage. Each engine developed about 165 horsepower (123 kW) and they were clutched together to drive the four-bladed wooden propeller immediately in front of the aft observer. The third prototype had a single water-cooled V-12 Liberty engine with the same total horsepower. The D-2s had a pair of 84-US-gallon (320 L; 70 imp gal) fuel tanks located below and behind the engines. Each tank was provided with two air-driven pumps that fed four 4-US-gallon (15 L; 3.3 imp gal) "service tanks" in the center section of the upper wing that gravity-fed the engines. The engines were provided with a 23.5-US-gallon (89 L; 19.6 imp gal) lubricating oil tank behind the fuel tanks.

== Development and testing ==
The first prototype D-2 was required to be delivered on 27 May, but this proved to be optimistic as production was seriously delayed by the company moving its factory from Norwich, Connecticut to Warwick, Rhode Island and shortages of skilled labor. The first prototype was completed sometime in early October and was equipped with floats. Although the exact date of its first flight is unknown, records confirm that it made several test flights in October. Demonstrating the aircraft to a visiting aviator on one of these flights, the pilot found that the crankshaft of one of the engines broke on takeoff and had to be declutched and shutdown during the flight. This was not a common problem for the Hall-Scott engines and one of Gallaudet's engineers speculated that the lack of vibration dampening from the rigid mounting of the engines to the steel channels in the fuselage contributed to the failure. Another possibility was "torsional vibrations caused by power fluctuations between the two motors." On 21 November, a control wire in one wing broke during the sixth flight of the day and caused the aircraft to crash into Greenwich Bay. The pilot was unhurt, but the wings and forward fuselage were destroyed.

Dr. William Durand, chairman of the National Advisory Committee for Aeronautics, and the aircraft designer William Stout inspected the Gallaudet factory and its aircraft in early December as the second prototype was being finished. They assessed the general layout of the D-2's wings as out of date and pointed out deficiencies in other areas like the electrical system as easily fixed. They were complimentary about the Gallaudet drive and how it gave the two observers unobstructed fields of fire. Stout especially praised the company's method of streamlining the bracing wires.

Completion of the second prototype, Army serial number 429, was expedited with the use of some parts from the first aircraft, although minor changes were made. The forward electric generator was deleted, and the rudder and vertical stabilizer were enlarged. Bad weather in Rhode Island delayed its first flight and the Army authorized its transfer to Langley Field, Virginia, later that month. The weather there was no better than that further north, and no flights could be made until late February 1918. On successive flights shortly afterwards, the crankshafts failed, and further flight testing had to be cancelled because spares were not available.

Because the first prototype had crashed before it was formally accepted by the Army, Gallaudet had to build a replacement at its own expense. Edson Gallaudet had been intrigued by the possibilities offered by the newly available Liberty engine as it was 500 pounds (230 kg) lighter than the D-2's existing engine installation and its lower profile would allow for a more streamlined installation in the aircraft than was possible with the Hall-Scott engines. Gallaudet requested the loan of an engine on 28 November, and his request was approved in April 1918. The replacement aircraft, serial number 432, had its engines and their associated gearing replaced by a Liberty engine. The prototype, called the Liberty D-2 by the company, was completed in early June with floats and made its first flight on 11 June. The flight had been scheduled for 14 June, but Jack McGee, the test pilot, wanted to make the flight on the 11th as there was a meeting of the company directors at the factory that morning. McGee was distraught after the death of his close friend Phil Rader in a flying accident the previous day and had not been able to sleep that night, but insisted on continuing with his plan despite arguments by Edson Gallaudet and other company officials that there was no urgency in making the first flight.

McGee made two successful short flights, but something went wrong on his third takeoff; the Liberty D-2 had barely cleared the water at nearly full speed when it settled back onto the water. The nose of the center float dug into the water, which caused the float to disintegrate under the stress. The aircraft flipped and immediately sank in about 25 feet (7.6 m) of water. McGee was knocked unconscious when his face hit the engine cowling and drowned despite attempts to rescue him. He was the first aviator to die in Rhode Island. A post-salvage examination of the wreck did not reveal any defects in the aircraft's construction. The Army terminated the program as it lacked further funding and no longer needed aircraft of this type. The wreck of the second prototype remained at Langley Field and the two incomplete prototypes were stored at the factory until July 1919 when they scrapped at the Aviation General Supply Depot in Middletown, Pennsylvania.

Two weeks after the crash, Edson Gallaudet made a proposal to the Navy for an enlarged Liberty D-2 suitable for a trans-Atlantic flight. The wing span would be increased to 75 feet (22.9 m) and the area of the wing to 1,150 square feet (106.8 m^{2}) while the fuel capacity would be roughly tripled, giving the aircraft an endurance of 23.57 hours at cruise speed. No record of any response has been found.

== Specifications (Liberty D-2) ==
Data from The Gallaudet Story: Part 14B: The Model D-2 for the Army; American Military Aircraft, 1908–1919

General characteristics

- Crew: 3
- Length: 40 ft 3 in (12.27 m)
- Upper wingspan: 69 ft (21 m)
- Lower wingspan: 53 ft (16 m)
- Height: 15 ft 9 in (4.80 m)
- Wing area: 1,060 sq ft (98 m^{2})
- Empty weight: 4,775 lb (2,166 kg)
- Fuel capacity: 168 US gal (640 L; 140 imp gal)
- Powerplant: 1 × Liberty L-12 water-cooled V12 engine, 330 hp (250 kW)
- Propellers: 4-bladed fixed-pitch propeller

Performance

- Maximum speed: 100 mph (160 km/h, 87 kn)
- Endurance: 5 hours (at full speed)

== Bibliography ==
- Casari, Robert B. (2014). American MIlitary Aircraft 1908–1919. n.p.: Aeronaut Books. ISBN 978-1-935881-13-1.
- Gordon, Robert (February 2005). "The Gallaudet Story: Part 9: 1916 Designs (Non-Gallaudet Drive Types)". WWI Aero: The Journal of the Early Aeroplane (187): 39–50. ISSN 0736-198X.
- Gordon, Robert (August 2006). "The Gallaudet Story: Part 14A: The Model D-2 for the Army". WWI Aero: The Journal of the Early Aeroplane (193): 26–40. ISSN 0736-198X.
- Gordon, Robert (November 2006). "The Gallaudet Story: Part 14B: The Model D-2 for the Army". WWI Aero: The Journal of the Early Aeroplane (194): 23–31. ISSN 0736-198X.
