= Cowesett =

Neighborhood in Warwick, Rhode Island, US

Coordinates: 41°40′52″N 71°27′40″W

Aerial view of Cowesett

Cowesett (ko-WEE-set) is a hillside neighborhood located in Warwick, Rhode Island.

== Location ==
Cowesett is bounded on the north by Rhode Island Route 117, on the south by East Greenwich, Rhode Island, on the east by U.S. 1 (Post Road), and on the west by Crompton / Rhode Island Route 2. To the east is the neighborhood of Chepiwanoxet and Greenwich Bay, an arm of Narragansett Bay. Cowesett is known as the "Wellesley by the Sea" for its similarity to the affluent Wellesely, Massachusetts, but near the coast. The neighborhood is in walking distance of Main Street and other attractions such as Scallop Town Park, Academy Field, and the town library in East Greenwich, Rhode Island.

== Name ==
The name Cowesett, which has had various spellings throughout history, may be derived from the Narragansett expression kówaw 'pine tree' + -es 'small' + -sett 'place', meaning 'Small Pine Place.' This place name may have designated by metonymy the earliest inhabitants of this area prior to contact with Europeans.

== Schools and Colleges ==
The one public school located in Cowesett is Cedar Hill Elementary School, and students who live in the neighborhood also attend the public schools of Scott Elementary School, Winman Junior High School, and Toll Gate High School.

== Notable residents ==
Cowesett is home to actor James Woods, former boxer Vinny Pazienza, and Olympic Gold Medalist Sara DeCosta. It is the former home of current Major League pitcher Dan Wheeler of the Tampa Bay Rays.

== Transportation ==
In 2010, the Massachusetts Bay Transit Authority (MBTA) opened up Warwick Station on the Providence/Stoughton Line, providing train service connecting T. F. Green Airport and Boston, Massachusetts.
