= Edson Fessenden Gallaudet =

American aerospace engineer

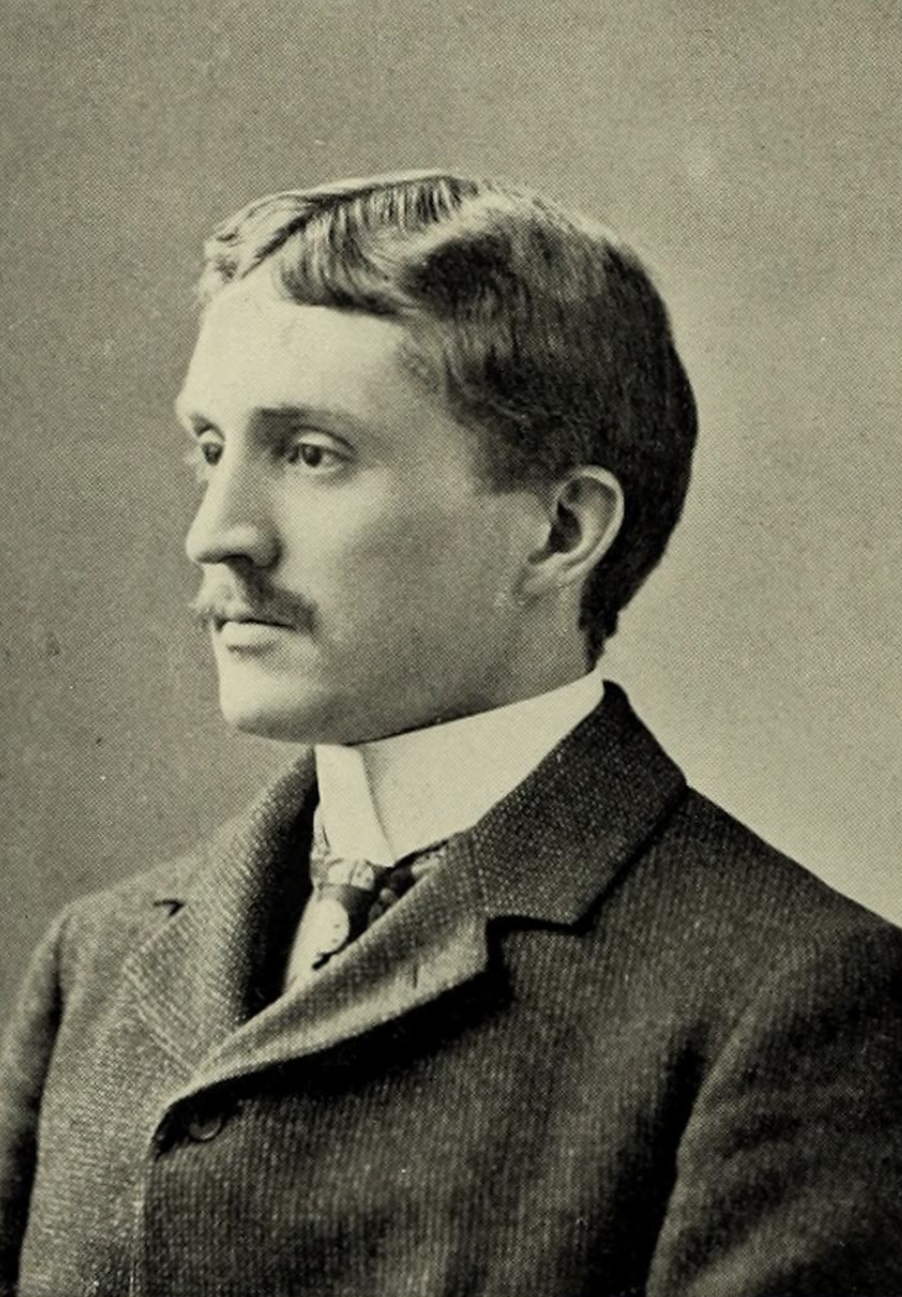
- Born: April 21, 1871; Washington, D.C., US
- Died: July 1, 1945 (aged 74); Pine Orchard, Connecticut, US
- Education: Yale University, B.A. (1893); Johns Hopkins University, Ph.D. (1896)
- Known for: Aviation pioneer in airfoils and seaplanes
- Notable work: Gallaudet Hydroplane
- Spouse: Marion Cockrell (m. 1903)
- Father: Edward Miner Gallaudet
- Relatives: Thomas Hopkins Gallaudet (grandfather); Francis Cockrell (father-in-law)

Edson Fessenden Gallaudet (April 21, 1871 – July 1, 1945) was a pioneer in the field of aviation. He was best known for his development of practical airfoils and aircraft propulsion systems for use in early seaplanes.

== Early life and early career ==
Edson Gallaudet was born April 21, 1871 in Washington, D.C. to Edward Miner Gallaudet, founder of Gallaudet University and son of Thomas Hopkins Gallaudet. Both his father and grandfather were famous educators in the field of deaf education. He received his B.A. from Yale University in 1893, and his Ph.D. in electrical engineering from Johns Hopkins University in 1896. As a student at Yale in the class of 1893 he was a member of Psi Upsilon and Skull and Bones. He was an associate fellow with the Institute of the Aeronautical Sciences, a member of the American Society of Aeronautic Engineers, Fédération Aéronautique Internationale, and a member of the Aero Club of America, Sigma Xi, Engineers' Club. He was a member of the Connecticut Academy of Arts and Sciences. He worked at Westinghouse Electric & Manufacturing Company in Pittsburgh, Pennsylvania from 1896 to 1897, then became an instructor of physics at Yale, where he taught from 1897 to 1900. From 1900 to 1903 he worked at William Cramp & Sons' Ship and Engine Building Company in Philadelphia, Pennsylvania and then, in 1903, worked at the National Cash Register Company in Dayton, Ohio. He married Marion Cockrell on February 14, 1903. From 1903 to 1908 he worked as an assistant to the President and General Superintendent of the Stillwell Bierce & Smith Vaile Company in Dayton (which later became the Platt Iron Works Company). In 1908 he worked for the New England Refrigerator Company in Norwich, Connecticut.

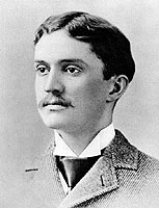
Edson Fessenden Gallaudet, c. 1892–1896

== Career in aviation ==
Gallaudet was the first person to experiment with warped wings in 1896, and in 1898 he built a warping-wing kite to test his invention of a warping-wing mechanism; this kite survives and is on display in the National Air and Space Museum in Washington, D.C. In 1911 he obtained US pilot's license No. 32 with the Aero Club of America, flying a Wright biplane in Garden City, New York. Also in 1911 he earned a pilot's brevet with the Aero Club of France flying a Nieuport monoplane. In 1908 Gallaudet founded the Gallaudet Engineering Company in Norwich, Connecticut where, as President, he did work as a mechanical and consulting engineer and, in 1909, built his first airplane. In 1914 he patented a radical new aircraft propulsion system that was later incorporated into his first seaplane prototype, the Gallaudet D-1 that was first tested on the Thames River in Connecticut. The need for larger facilities and a better location to test his seaplanes, he moved his company to Chepiwanoxet Point on the Narragansett Bay coast in Rhode Island. The Gallaudet Engineering Company was incorporated as the Gallaudet Aircraft Corporation in 1917. In 1923 Gallaudet built an all-metal aircraft, the TW-3 that first flew on June 20, 1923 at Wilbur Wright Field in Ohio.

== Retirement and family life ==
In 1924 Gallaudet retired from the company he had founded. The company assets were acquired by Major Reuben H. Fleet, who used them as the core around which he founded Consolidated Aircraft Corporation.

Edson's wife Marion Cockrell Gallaudet, daughter of Francis Marion Cockrell, launched USS Missouri (BB-11).

He died in 1945 in Pine Orchard, Connecticut.

== Papers and publications ==
- Schatzberg, Eric. 1999. Wings of Wood, Wings of Metal: Culture and Technical Choice in American Airplane Materials, 1914–1945. Princeton University Press,
- Gallaudet, Edson Fessenden. 1896. Relations between Length, Elasticity, and Magnetization of Iron and Nickel Wire. Washington, DC: Gibson Bros.
- Gallaudet, Edson F. 1920. The Gallaudet Review. East Greenwich: Gallaudet Aircraft Corp.
- Gallaudet, Edson. 1915. Affidavit (in The Wright Company vs. The Curtiss Aeroplane Company lawsuit). New York: January 8, 1915, 11 pages, plus illustrations. (Source: Renstrom, Arthur G. 2002. "Wilbur & Orville Wright—A Bibliography Commemorating the One-Hundredth Anniversary of the First Powered Flight, December 17, 1903" (PDF). Archived from the original on January 4, 2011., Monographs in Aerospace History, Number 27, September 2002, p. 87.) (Unpublished.)
