= Gallaudet D-4 =

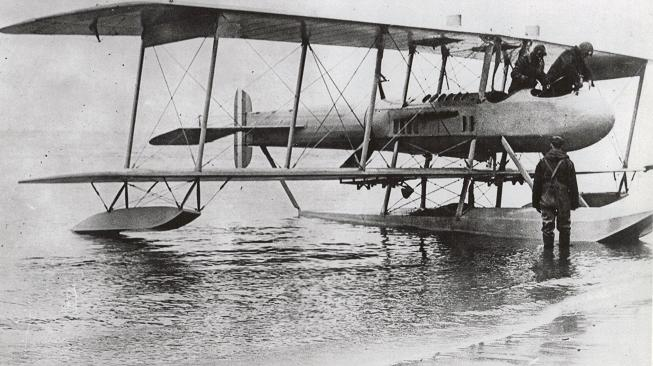

General information
- Type: Observation aircraft
- Manufacturer: Gallaudet Aircraft Company
- Primary user: United States Navy
- Number built: 2

History
- Introduction date: 1918
- First flight: 1918

The Gallaudet D-4 was an unusual biplane designed and built by Gallaudet Aircraft Company for the United States Navy. It was powered by a Liberty L-12 engine buried within the fuselage which turned a large, four-bladed propeller attached to a ring around the center fuselage. Only two were constructed, with the second being accepted by the Navy for service as an observation aircraft.

== Development ==
In response to a requirement by the U.S. Navy for light floatplanes capable of being launched off catapults by ships underway, the Gallaudet Aircraft company began development of the "D-4", based on the earlier Gallaudet D-1. The D-1 was powered by two Duesenberg engines of 150 hp (110 kW) each and used a clutch mechanism to allow the use of one or both engines.

== Operational history ==
Two D-4s were built, serial numbers A:2653 and A:2654. The prototype crashed as result of a failed elevator control during flight testing on 19 July 1918, killing the pilot, Lt. Arthur Souther. The second D4 first flew in October 1918 and was accepted by the U.S. Navy in April 1919. This aircraft was entered in the Curtiss Marine Trophy Race during the National Air Races in Detroit Michigan on October 8, 1922, but had to leave the race after the fifth lap because of a broken propeller.

== Operators ==
United States

- United States Navy

== Specifications ==
Data from American Combat Planes, p. 118

General characteristics

- Crew: two (pilot, observer)
- Length: 33 ft 6 in (10.2 m)
- Wingspan: 46 ft 5 in (14.1 m)
- Height: 11 ft 8 in (3.6 m)
- Wing area: 612 sq ft (56.9 m^{2})
- Empty weight: 4,228 lb (1,918 kg)
- Gross weight: 5,440 lb (2,468 kg)
- Powerplant: 1 × Liberty L-12 V-12 water-cooled piston engine , 360 hp (269 kW)

Performance

- Maximum speed: 119 mph (192 km/h, 103 kn) landing speed 58 mph
- Range: 390 mi (628 km, 340 nmi)
- Endurance: 3 hours 30 minutes
- Service ceiling: 14,000 ft (4,267 m)

Armament

- None

== See also ==
Related development

- Gallaudet D-1
- Gallaudet D-2

Aircraft of comparable role, configuration, and era

- Curtiss R-6
- Royal Aircraft Factory B.E.9
- SPAD S.A

== Bibliography ==
- Casari, Robert B. (2014). American MIlitary Aircraft 1908–1919. n.p.: Aeronaut Books. ISBN 978-1-935881-13-1.
- "The Gallaudet Story: Part 16A: The Model D-4". WWI Aero: The Journal of the Early Aeroplane (196): 28–46. May 2007. ISSN 0736-198X.
- "The Gallaudet Story: Part 16B: The Model D-4 Continued". WWI Aero: The Journal of the Early Aeroplane (197): 28–49. August 2007. ISSN 0736-198X.
