= Sikorsky S-8 =

S-8
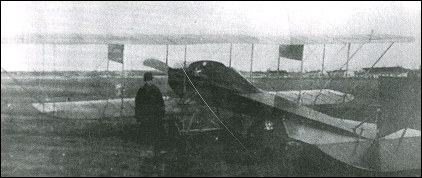
- Sikorsky S-8 near Saint Petersburg in 1912

General information
- Type: Trainer
- National origin: Russian Empire
- Manufacturer: Russian Baltic Railroad Car Works
- Designer: Igor Sikorsky
- Number built: 1

History
- First flight: 17 September 1912

The Sikorsky S-8 Malyutka (baby) was a small Russian single engine aircraft built by the Russian Baltic Railroad Car Works shortly after Igor Sikorsky became chief engineer of the aircraft manufacturing division in 1912.

== Design and development ==
The S-8 was a two bay biplane trainer powered by a 50 hp (37 kW) Gnome air-cooled rotary engine with the main wings and landing gear of similar design to the S-6-A. Completed early in the summer of 1912, the aircraft featured a side by side seating arrangement with controls that could be moved between the instructor and student. For improved downward visibility the lower wing had no fabric covering between the wing root and first rib.

== Operational history ==
On the evening of 17 September 1912, Sikorsky piloted the S-8 on a ninety minute night flight from the Korpusnoi Aerodrome near Saint Petersburg. He landed with help of fires set at the airfield.

== Specifications ==
Data from Russian Aviation Museum

General characteristics

- Crew: Two
- Length: 24 ft 7 in (7.5 m)
- Upper wingspan: 39 ft 4 in (12 m)
- Lower wingspan: 26 ft 3 in (8 m)
- Wing area: 290 sq ft (27 m^{2})
- Powerplant: 1 × Gnome Omega 7-cylinder air-cooled rotary piston engine, 50 hp (37 kW)

Performance

- Maximum speed: 50 mph (80 km/h, 43 kn)
