= Sikorsky Aircraft =

Aircraft manufacturer in the United States

Coordinates: 41°15′0″N 73°5′50″W

Sikorsky Aircraft Corporation
- Company type: Subsidiary
- Industry: Aviation; Defense industry
- Founded: 1923; 103 years ago
- Founder: Igor Sikorsky
- Headquarters: Stratford, Connecticut, United States
- Key people: Richard Benton (president)
- Products: Helicopters, other aircraft
- Number of employees: 15,975 (2014)
- Parent: United Aircraft and Transport Corporation (1929–1934); United Aircraft Corporation (1934–1974); United Technologies (1975–2015); Lockheed Martin (2015–present)
- Divisions: Sikorsky Development Flight Center, West Palm Beach, Florida, US (founded 1977)
- Subsidiaries: Schweizer Aircraft (closed 2012); PZL Mielec (now a Lockheed Martin subsidiary); Tata–Sikorsky Aerospace Limited (JV with TASL)
- Website: sikorsky.com

Sikorsky Aircraft is an American aircraft manufacturer based in Stratford, Connecticut. It was established by the Russian-American aviation pioneer Igor Sikorsky in 1923, and was among the first companies to manufacture helicopters for civilian and military use. It also produced seaplanes for passenger transport and surface vehicles such as trains and boats.

Sikorsky was owned by United Technologies Corporation until November 2015, when it was sold to Lockheed Martin.

== History ==
On March 5, 1923, the Sikorsky Aero Engineering Corporation was founded near Roosevelt Field, New York, by Igor Sikorsky, an immigrant to the United States who was born in Kiev, in the Russian Empire (today in Ukraine). In 1925, the company name was changed to Sikorsky Manufacturing Company. After the success of the S-38, the company was reorganized as the Sikorsky Aviation Corporation with capital of $5,000,000, allowing the purchase of land and the building of a modern aircraft factory in Stratford, Connecticut. The company moved its headquarters there in 1929, and it became a part of United Aircraft and Transport Corporation (later United Technologies Corporation or UTC) in July of that year.

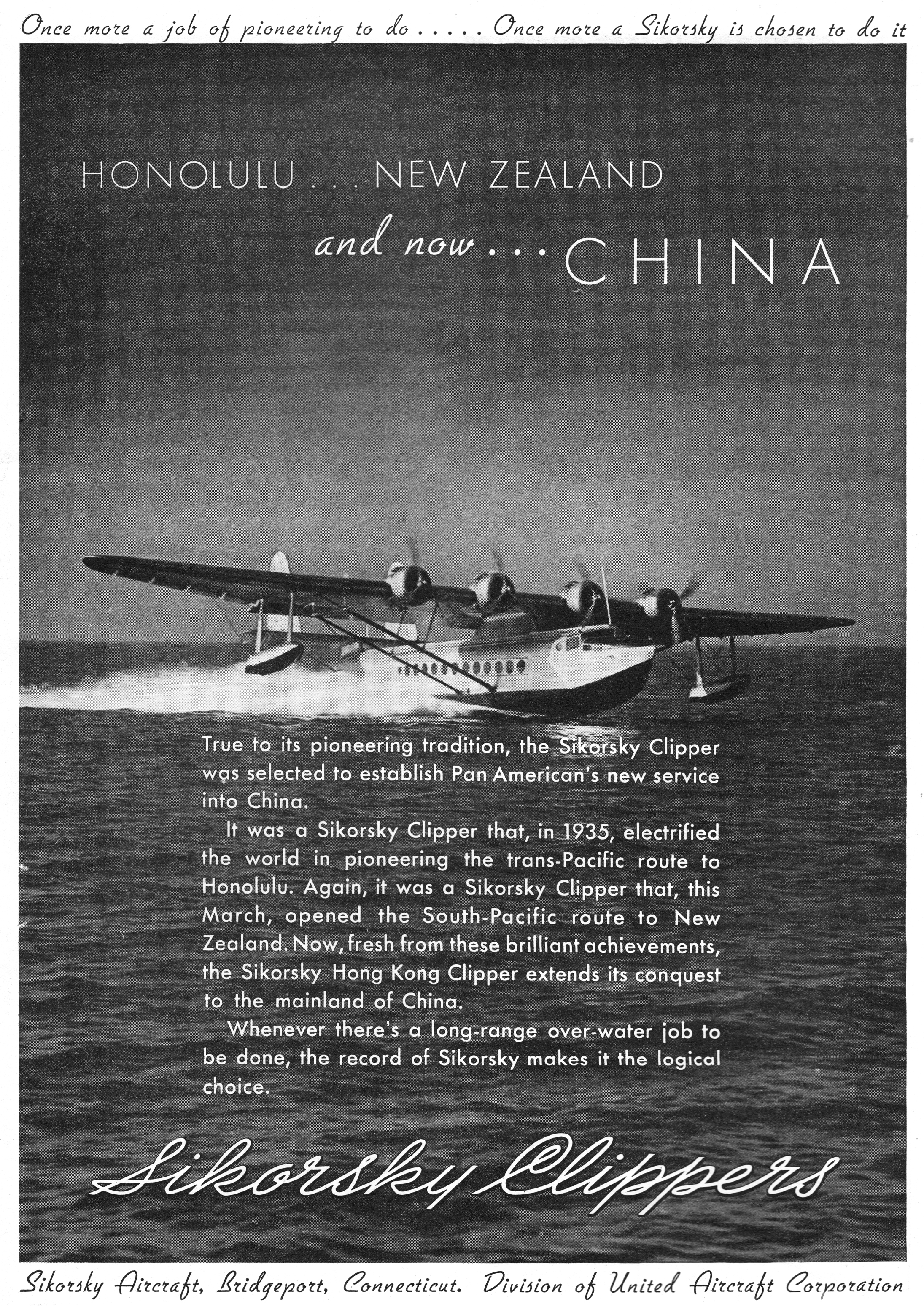
Advertisement for Sikorsky S-42 Clipper flying boat from 1937

In the United States, Igor Sikorsky originally concentrated on the development of multiengine landplanes and then amphibious aircraft. In the late 1930s, sales declined and United Aircraft merged his division with Vought Aircraft. He then began work on developing a practical helicopter. After first flying the VS-300 he developed the Sikorsky R-4, the first stable, single-rotor, fully controllable helicopter to enter full-scale production in 1942, upon which most subsequent helicopters were based.

Sikorsky Aircraft remains a leading helicopter manufacturer, producing such well-known models as the UH-60 Black Hawk and SH-60 Seahawk, and experimental types such as the Sikorsky S-72. Sikorsky has supplied the Presidential helicopter since 1957. Sikorsky's VH-3 and VH-60 perform this role now.

The company acquired Helicopter Support Inc. (HSI) in 1998. HSI handles non-U.S. government aftermarket support for parts and repair for the Sikorsky product lines.

UTC acquired Schweizer Aircraft Corp. in 2004, after which it operated as a subsidiary of Sikorsky. The product lines of the two firms were complementary, and had little overlap, as Sikorsky primarily concentrates on medium and large helicopters, while Schweizer produces small helicopters, unmanned aerial vehicles (UAV), gliders, and light planes. The Schweizer deal was signed on August 26, 2004, exactly one week after the death of Paul Schweizer, the company's founder and majority owner. In late 2005, Sikorsky completed the purchase of Keystone Helicopter Corporation, located in Coatesville, Pennsylvania. Keystone had been maintaining and completing Sikorsky S-76 and S-92 helicopters prior to the sale.

Sikorsky Aircraft logo until November 2015

In 2007, Sikorsky opened the Hawk Works, a Rapid Prototyping and Military Derivatives Completion Center located west of the Elmira-Corning Regional Airport in Big Flats, New York. That same year Sikorsky purchased the PZL Mielec plant in Poland. The plant is assembling the S-70i for international customers.

In February 2009, Sikorsky Global Helicopters was created as a business unit of Sikorsky Aircraft to focus on the construction and marketing of commercial helicopters. The business unit combined the main civil helicopters that were produced by Sikorsky Aircraft and the helicopter business of Schweizer Aircraft that Sikorsky had acquired in 2004. It was based at Coatesville, Pennsylvania until 2022.

In 2011, Sikorsky laid off 400 workers at the Hawk Works plant, and in 2012 discharged the remaining 570 workers and closed all Sikorsky facilities in Chemung County, moving the military completion work to their West Palm Beach, Florida, facility. The commercial products had already been moved to their Coatesville, Pennsylvania facility.

Sikorsky's main plant and administrative offices are located in Stratford, Connecticut, as is a large company-owned private heliport (ICAO: KJSD, FAA LID: JSD). Other Sikorsky facilities are in Trumbull, Shelton, and Bridgeport, Connecticut (with small company heliport (FAA LID: CT37)); Fort Worth, Texas; West Palm Beach, Florida; and Huntsville and Troy, Alabama. Sikorsky-owned subsidiaries are in Grand Prairie, Texas, and elsewhere around the world.

In 2023, Sikorsky Aircraft celebrated their 100-year anniversary.

=== Acquisition ===
In 2015, UTC considered Sikorsky to be less profitable than its other subsidiaries, and analyzed a possible spin-off rather than a tax-heavy sale.

On July 20, 2015, Lockheed Martin announced an agreement to purchase Sikorsky from UTC for $9.0 billion. The deal required review from eight different jurisdictions, and the final approval came in November 2015. The sale was completed on November 6, 2015.

== AHS Sikorsky Prize ==
In 1980, the American Helicopter Society International offered a prize of US$10,000 for the first human-powered helicopter flight (60-second duration, a height of 3 meters, and staying within an area of 10 x 10 m) and soon increased prize money to US$25,000. In 2010, Sikorsky Aircraft pledged to increase the prize sponsorship to US$250,000. Canadian engineers Dr. Todd Reichert and Cameron Robertson developed the world's largest human-powered helicopter with a team from the University of Toronto. The first flight of AeroVelo Atlas was achieved in August 2012, the 64-second, 3.3-m-flight that won the prize on June 13, 2013.

== Products ==
Sikorsky designates nearly all of its models with S-numbers; numbers S-1 through S-27 were designed by Igor Sikorsky before he left the Russian Empire. Later models, especially helicopters, received multiple designations by the military services using them, often depending on purpose (UH, SH, and MH for instance), even if the physical craft had only minor variations in equipment. In some cases, the aircraft were returned to Sikorsky or to another manufacturer and additionally modified, resulting in still further variants on the same basic model number.

=== Airplanes ===
- Sikorsky S-28: projected four-engine, 32-passenger biplane airliner; Sikorsky's first American design (1919)
- Sikorsky S-29-A: twin-engine, cargo biplane, first Sikorsky aircraft built in the U.S. (1924)
- Sikorsky S-30: twin-engine biplane airliner/mailplane, never built (1925)
- Sikorsky S-31: single-engine biplane (1925)
- Sikorsky S-32: single-engine, two-passenger biplane (1926)
- Sikorsky S-33 Messenger: single-engine biplane (1925)
- Sikorsky S-34: twin-engine sesquiplane flying boat prototype (1927)
- Sikorsky S-35: three-engine biplane transport (1926)
- Sikorsky S-36 "Amphibion": eight-seat two-engine sesquiplane flying boat (1927)
- Sikorsky S-37 "Guardian": eight-seat two-engine sesquiplane; Sikorsky's last land-based fixed wing design (1927)
- Sikorsky S-38: eight-seat, two-engine sesquiplane flying boat (US Navy PS) (1928–1933)
  - Sikorsky RS: transport flying boat (US Navy RS)
- Sikorsky S-39: five-seat, single-engine variant of S-38 (1929–1932)
- Sikorsky S-40: four-engine, 28-passenger monoplane flying boat (1931)
- Sikorsky S-41: twin-engine monoplane flying boat (1931) (USN RS-1); scaled-up monoplane version of S-38
- Sikorsky XP2S: twin-engine patrol flying boat prototype (1932)
- Sikorsky XSS: Naval scout flying-boat (1933)
- Sikorsky S-42 "Clipper": four-engine flying boat (1934–1935)
- Sikorsky XBLR-3: Bomber aircraft (1935-1936); Sikorsky's last fixed-wing design
- Sikorsky S-43 "Baby Clipper": twin-engine, amphibious flying boat (1935–1937) (Army OA-1, USN JRS-1); downsized, twin-engine version of S-42
- Sikorsky VS-44 "Excalibur": four-engine flying boat (1937)
- Sikorsky S-45: six-engine flying boat (for Pan Am), never built (1938)
- Sikorsky S-57/XV-2: Supersonic convertiplane with single blade retractable rotor. Never built.

=== Helicopters, production ===
| Model | Designation | From | Until | MTOW (lb, t) | | Notes |
|---|---|---|---|---|---|---|
| S-47 | R-4 | 1942 | 1944 | 2,581 | 1.17 | World's first production helicopter |
| S-48/S-51 | R-5/H-5 | 1944 | 1952 | 4,825 | 2.19 | higher load, endurance, speed, and service ceiling than the R-4 |
| S-49 | R-6 | 1945 | | 2,600 | 1.18 | improved R-4 with new fuselage |
| S-52 | H-18/HO5S | 1947 | | 2,700 | 1.225 | all-metal rotors |
| S-55 | H-19 Chickasaw | 1949 | | 7,500 | 3.41 | ten passenger utility, H-19 Chickasaw |
| S-56 | CH-37 Mojave | 1953 | | 31,000 | 14.1 | twin-piston engined, H-37A Mojave |
| S-58 | H-34 Choctaw | 1954 | 1970 | 14,000 | 6.35 | 18 passenger larger, advanced S-55, including ASW, VIP versions |
| S-61 | SH-3 | 1959 | | 19,000 | 8.62 | medium-lift transport/airliner |
| S-61 | SH-3 Sea King | 1959 | 1970s | 22,050 | 10 | ASW, SAR or transport |
| S-61 | CH-124 Sea King | 1963 | 2018 | 22,050 | 10 | Canadian Armed Forces export version |
| S-61R | CH-3/HH-3 | 1963 | 1970s | 22,050 | 10 | S-61 with rear cargo ramp: CH-3, HH-3 "Jolly Green Giant", and HH-3F Pelican (1963) |
| S-62 | HH-52 Seaguard | 1958 | | 8,300 | 3.76 | amphibious helicopter |
| S-64 Skycrane | CH-54 Tarhe | 1962 | | 42,000 | 19.05 | "flying crane" |
| S-64 | CH-54 Tarhe | 1962 | | 47,000 | 21 | US Army transport |
| S-65 | CH-53 Sea Stallion | 1964 | 1978 | 42,000 | 19.1 | medium/heavy lift transport |
| S-65 | MH-53 | 1967 | 1970 | 46,000 | 21 | long-range search and rescue |
| S-70 | UH-60 Black Hawk | 1974 | current | 23,500 | 10.66 | twin-turbine medium transport/utility, selected in 1976 for the US Army UTTAS, multiple models |
| S-70 | SH-60 Sea Hawk | 1979 | current | 23,000 | 10.4 | US Navy anti-ship warfare, combat, SAR, support, Medevac |
| S-70 | HH-60 Pave Hawk | 1982 | current | 22,000 | 9.9 | USAF combat, SAR, Medevac with PAVE electronics |
| S-70 | HH-60 Jayhawk | 1990 | 1996 | 21,884 | 9.93 | US Coast Guard SAR and patrol |
| S-76 | | 1977 | current | 11,700 | 5.31 | twin turbine, 14-seat commercial (ex S-74) |
| S-80 | CH-53E Super Stallion | 1974 | 1980s | 73,500 | 33.3 | CH-53 derived, export version: S-80 |
| S-92 | H-92 Superhawk | 1998 | current | 27,700 | 12.6 | twin-turbine medium-lift developed from the S-70 |
| S-92 | CH-148 Cyclone | 2018 | current | 28,650 | 13 | Canadian military S-92 to replace the CH-124 Sea King |
| S-95 | CH-53K King Stallion | 2018 | current | 84,700 | 38.4 | CH-53E Super Stallion/S-80 development |
| S-300C | | 1964 | 2018 | 2,050 | 0.93 | three-seat single-piston, currently made by Schweizer RSG |
| S-333 | | 1992 | 2018 | 2,550 | 1.16 | single turbine S-300, currently made by Schweizer RSG |
| S-434 | | 2008 | 2015 | 3,200 | 1.45 | improved S-333 |

=== Helicopters, prototypes ===
| Model | Designation | Year | MTOW (lb, t) | | Notes |
|---|---|---|---|---|---|
| S-46 | VS-300 | 1939 | 1,150 | 0.52 | first US single lifting rotor helicopter |
| S-50 | | | | | projected small helicopter; only a wooden mockup built |
| S-53 | XHJS-1 | 1947 | | | naval utility, two prototypes |
| S-54 | | 1948 | | | R-4B modified to a "sesqui-tandem" configuration |
| S-59 | XH-39 | 1953 | 3,361 | 1.53 | 2 H-18s converted to use one turbine, 1 prototype |
| S-60 | | 1959 | 21,000 | 9.5 | CH-37-derived prototype "flying crane", crashed 1961 |
| S-67 | Blackhawk | 1970 | 24,272 | 11 | attack prototype, predecessor: S-66 AAFSS competitor |
| S-68 | | | | | proposed modification of the S-58T, none built |
| S-69 | | 1973 | 12,500 | 5.7 | prototype jet compound helicopter with coaxial rotors |
| S-71 | AAH | | | | US Army Advanced Attack Helicopter entry with S-70 dynamic components |
| S-72 | | 1976 | 26,047 | 11.8 | NASA experimental jet hybrid |
| S-73 | HLH | | 118,000 | 53.5 | US Army Heavy Lift Helicopter entry |
| S-75 | | 1984 | 8,470 | 3.82 | advanced Composite Airframe Program (ACAP) all-composite, two prototypes |
| S-78-20 & S-78-29 | | 1975 | 17,520 (-20); 19,997 (-29) | 7.95 (-20); 9.07 (-29) | proposed variation on S-70 in 20- and enlarged 29-pax models, purpose-built for commercial use. Initially designated S-70C-. Reexplored and redesignated, post S-76, but ultimately never built. |
| S-97 Raider | AAS | 2015 | 11,000 | 4.99 | US Army Armed Aerial Scout proposed compound helicopter |
| S-100 | SB>1 Defiant | 2019 | | | compound helicopter prototype with rigid coaxial rotors for US Army's Future Long-Range Assault Aircraft competition |
| S-102 | Raider X | 2023 | | | compound helicopter with rigid coaxial rotors for US Army's Future Attack Reconnaissance Aircraft competition |
| S-103 | Defiant X | | | | compound helicopter with rigid coaxial rotors for US Army's Future Long-Range Assault Aircraft competition |
| Firefly | | | | | electric S-300 unveiled in 2010 |
| X2 | | 2008 | 6,000 | 2.72 | experimental high-speed compound helicopter with coaxial rotors |

=== Other aircraft ===
- Boeing-Sikorsky RAH-66 Comanche
- Sikorsky Cypher: Doughnut-shaped UAV (1992)
- Sikorsky Cypher II: development of the Cypher (2001)
- Vertical Take-Off and Landing Experimental Aircraft: design and development of a hybrid VTOL/Conventional design
- Sikorsky Rotor Blown Wing

=== Other products ===
- UAC TurboTrain (1968)
- Sikorsky ASPB Assault Support Patrol Boat (1969)

== Gallery ==
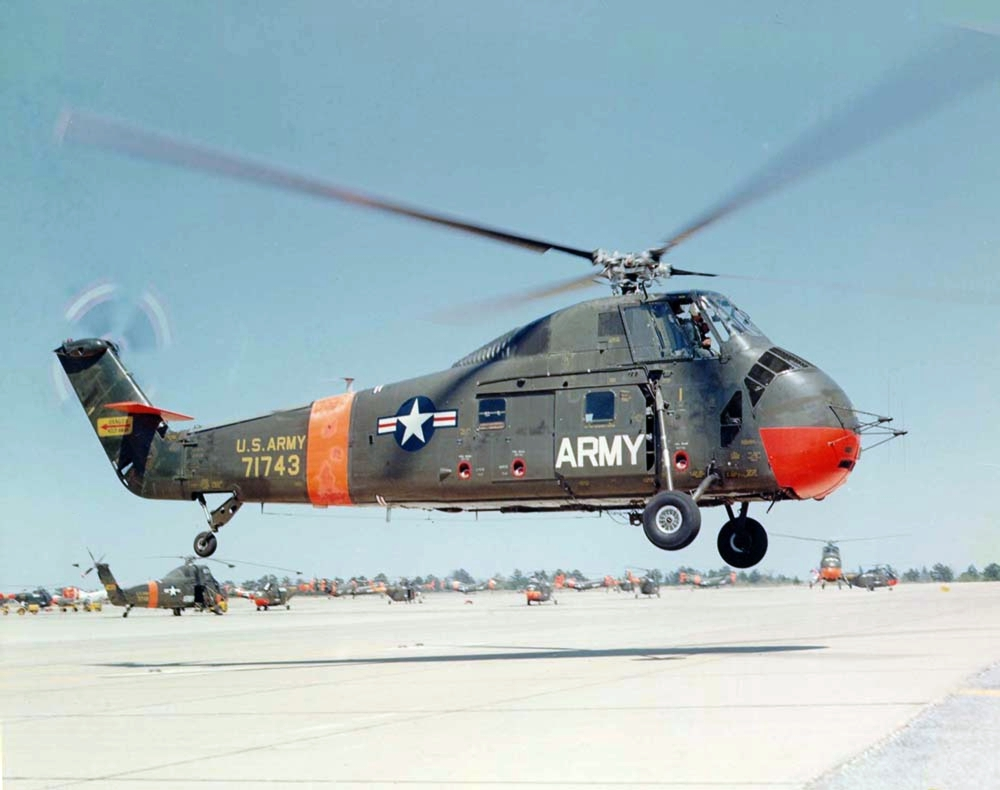
H-34 Choctaw

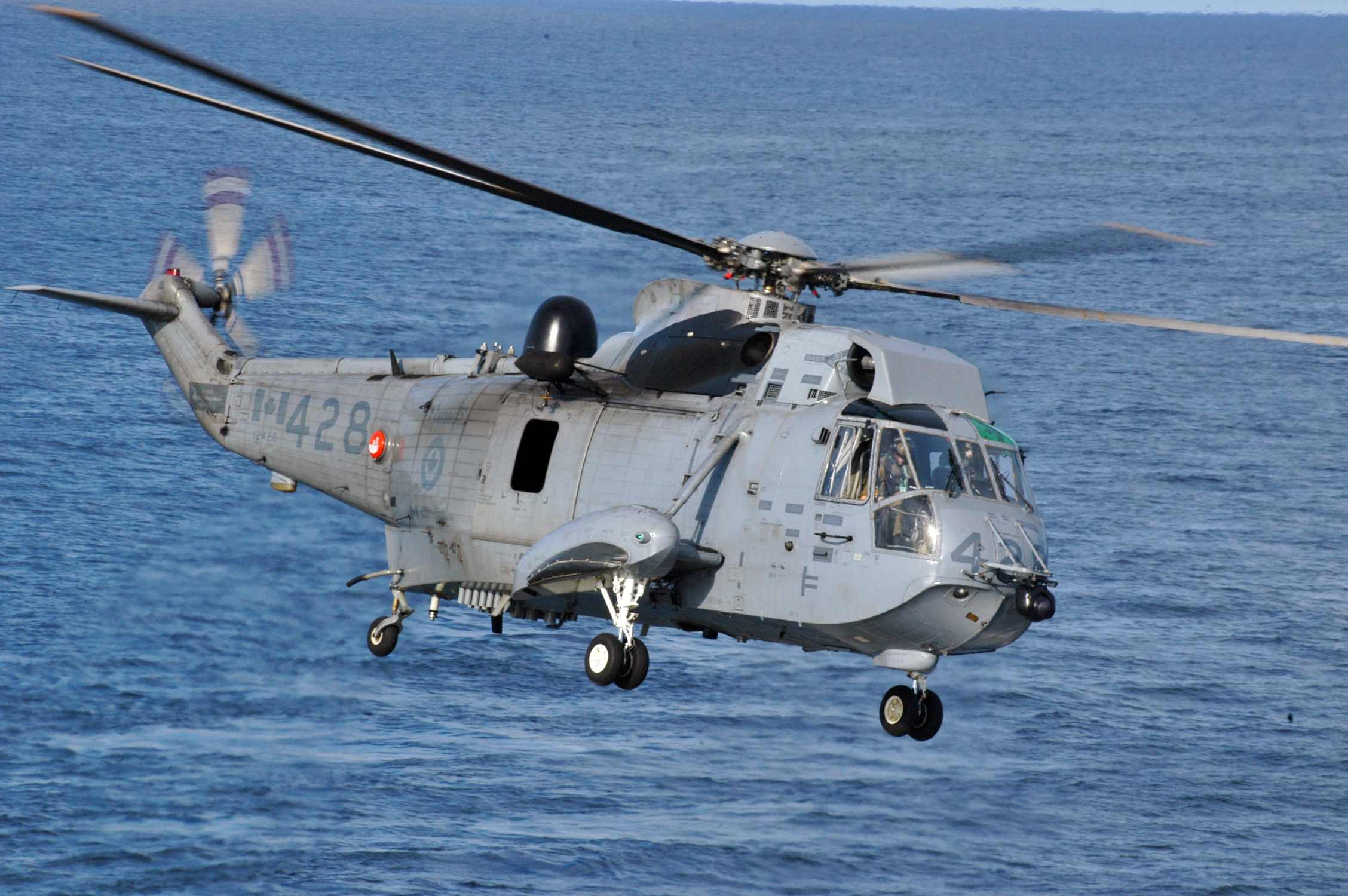
Canadian CH-124 Sea King

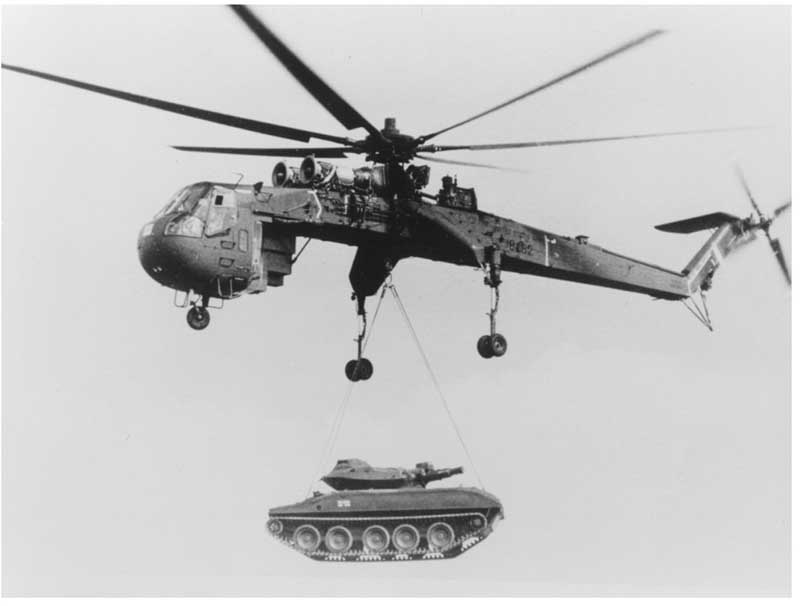
CH-54 Tarhe

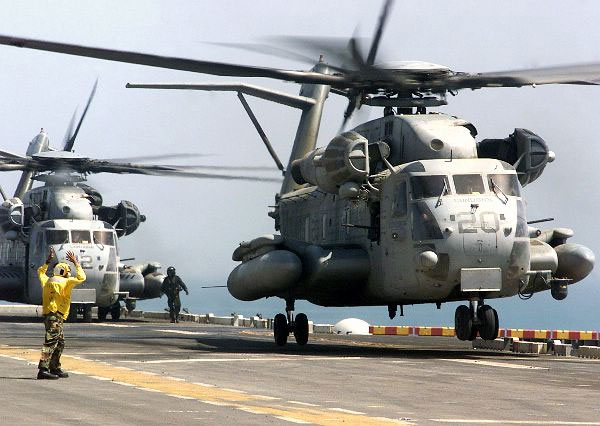
CH-53E Super Stallion

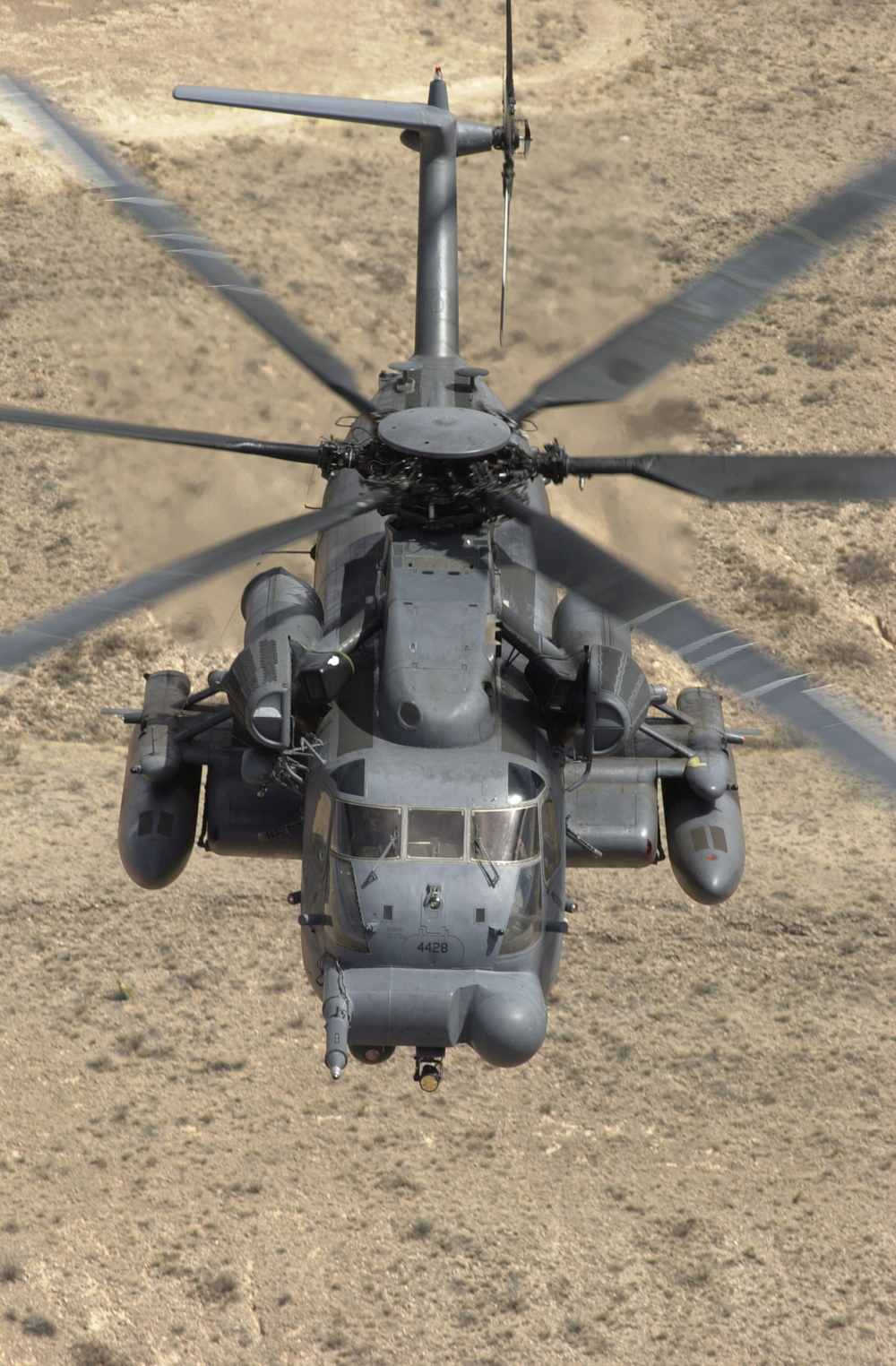
MH-53J Pave Low III

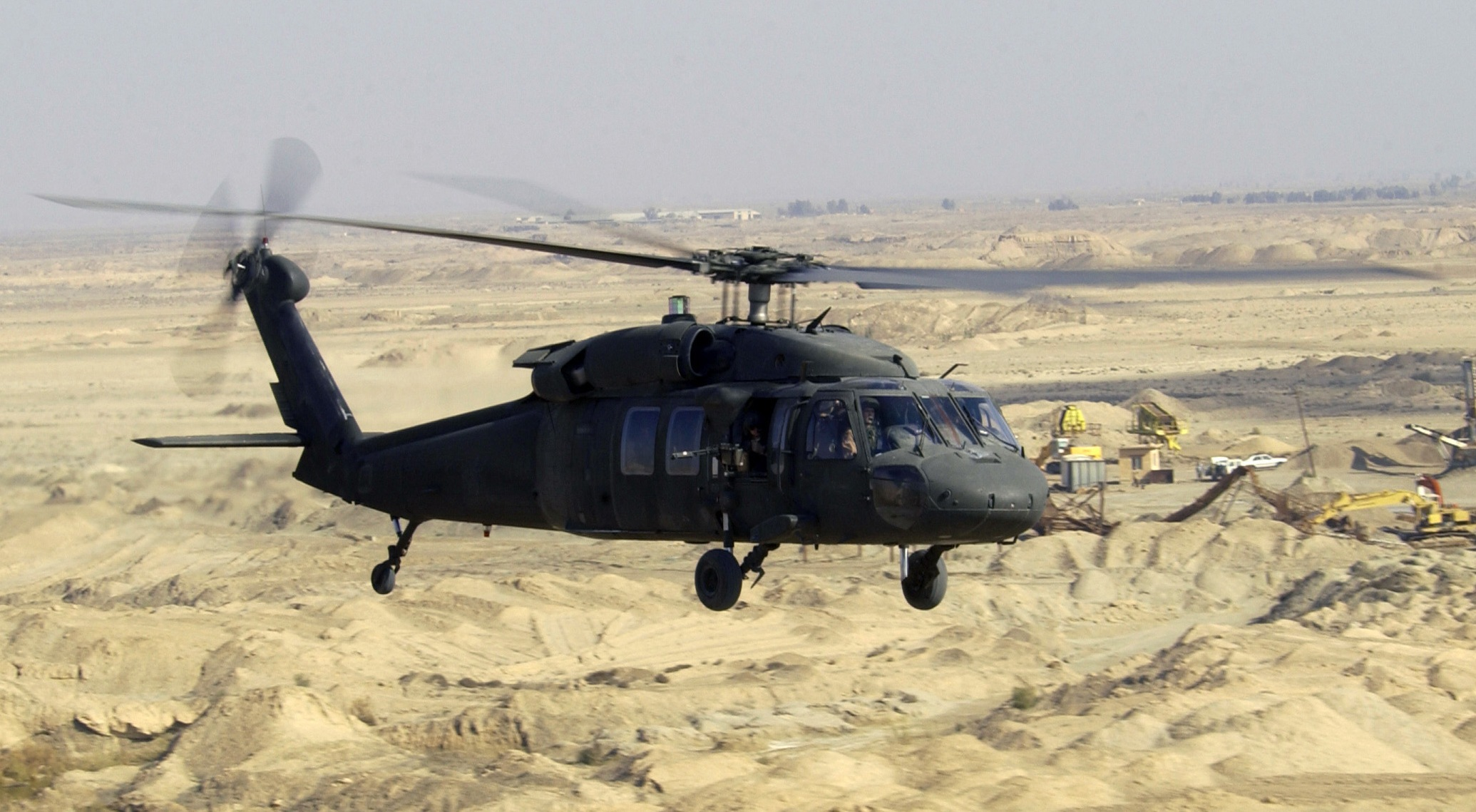
UH-60 Black Hawk

== See also ==
- List of aerospace flight test centres
- Igor I. Sikorsky Memorial Bridge
- Sikorsky Memorial Airport

Comparable major helicopter manufacturers:

- AgustaWestland
- Airbus Helicopters
- Bell Helicopter
- Boeing Rotorcraft Systems
- MD Helicopters
- Russian Helicopters
