= Igor Sikorsky =

Russian-American aviation pioneer (1889–1972)

- Игорь Сикорский
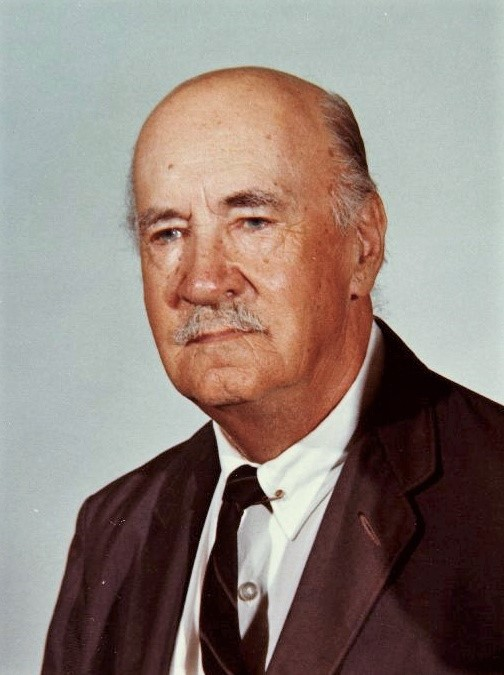
- Studio portrait, c. 1950
- Born: May 25, 1889; Kiev, Russian Empire
- Died: October 26, 1972 (aged 83); Easton, Connecticut, US
- Education: Kiev Polytechnic Institute
- Occupation: Aircraft designer
- Known for: Founding of Sikorsky Aircraft; first successful mass-produced helicopter, the Sikorsky R-4
- Spouses: Olga Fyodorovna Simkovitch; Elisabeth Semion
- Children: 5
- Awards: Order of St. Vladimir; Howard N. Potts Medal (1933); Daniel Guggenheim Medal (1951); ASME Medal (1963); Wright Brothers Memorial Trophy (1966); National Medal of Science (1967); John Fritz Medal (1968)

Igor Ivanovich Sikorsky (Note: In this name that follows East Slavic naming customs, the patronymic is Ivanovich and the family name is Sikorsky.) (Note: Russian: Игорь Иванович Сикорский, romanized: Igor Ivanovich Sikorsky, IPA: [ˈiɡərʲ ɪˈvanəvitʃ sʲɪˈkorskʲɪj], Ukrainian: Ігор Іванович Сікорський, romanized: Ihor Ivanovych Sikorskyi) (25 May 1889 – 26 October 1972) was a Russian-American (Note: Attributed to the following:) aviation pioneer in both helicopters and fixed-wing aircraft. His first success came with the Sikorsky S-2, the second aircraft of his design and construction. His fifth airplane, the S-5, won him national recognition in Russia and secured F.A.I. pilot's license number 64. His S-6-A received the highest award at the 1912 Moscow Aviation Exhibition, and in the fall of that year the aircraft won first prize for its young designer, builder and pilot in the military competition at Saint Petersburg. In 1913, the Sikorsky-designed Russky Vityaz (S-21) became the first successful four-engine aircraft to take flight. He also designed and built the Ilya Muromets (S-22 – S-27) family of four-engine aircraft, an airliner which he redesigned to be the world's first four-engine bomber when World War I broke out.

After emigrating to the United States in 1919 because of the Russian Revolution, Sikorsky founded the Sikorsky Aircraft Corporation in 1923 and developed the first of Pan American Airways' ocean-crossing flying boats in the 1930s, including the Sikorsky S-42 "Flying Clipper".

In 1939, Sikorsky designed and flew the Vought-Sikorsky VS-300, the first viable American helicopter, which pioneered the single main rotor and a single antitorque tail rotor configuration used by most helicopters today. Sikorsky modified the design into the Sikorsky R-4, which became the world's first mass-produced helicopter in 1942.

== Early life ==
Igor Sikorsky was born in Kiev, Russian Empire (now Kyiv, Ukraine), on May 25, 1889. He was the youngest of five children. His father, Ivan Alexeevich Sikorsky, was a professor of psychology in Saint Vladimir University (now Taras Shevchenko National University), a psychiatrist with an international reputation, and an ardent Russian nationalist.

Igor Sikorsky was an Orthodox Christian. When questioned regarding his roots, he would answer: "My family is of Russian origin. My grandfather and other ancestors from the time of Peter the Great were Russian Orthodox priests."

Sikorsky's mother, Mariya Stefanovna Sikorskaya (née Temryuk-Cherkasova), was a physician who did not work professionally. She is sometimes called Zinaida Sikorsky. While homeschooling young Igor, she gave him a great love for art, especially in the life and work of Leonardo da Vinci, and the stories of Jules Verne. In 1900, at age 11, he accompanied his father to Germany and through conversations with his father became interested in natural sciences. After returning home, Sikorsky began to experiment with model flying machines, and by age 12, he had made a small rubber band-powered helicopter.

Sikorsky began studying at the Saint Petersburg Maritime Cadet Corps in 1903 at the age of 14. In 1906, he determined that his future lay in engineering, so he resigned from the academy, despite his satisfactory standing, and left the Russian Empire to study in Paris. He returned to the Russian Empire in 1907, enrolling at the Mechanical College of the Kiev Polytechnic Institute. After the academic year, Sikorsky again accompanied his father to Germany in the summer of 1908, where he learned of the accomplishments of the Wright brothers' Flyer and Ferdinand von Zeppelin's rigid airships. Sikorsky later said about this event: "Within twenty-four hours, I decided to change my life's work. I would study aviation."

By the start of World War I in 1914, Sikorsky's airplane research and production business in Kiev was flourishing, and his factory made bombers during the war. After the Russian Revolution in 1917, Igor Sikorsky fled his homeland in early 1918, because the Bolsheviks threatened to shoot him for being "the Tsar's friend and a very popular person". He moved to France where he was offered a contract for the design of a new, more powerful Muromets-type plane. But in November 1918 the war ended, and the French government stopped subsidizing military orders, whereupon he decided to move to the United States. On March 24, 1919, he left France on the ocean liner Lorraine, arriving in New York City on March 30, 1919.

== Aircraft designer ==
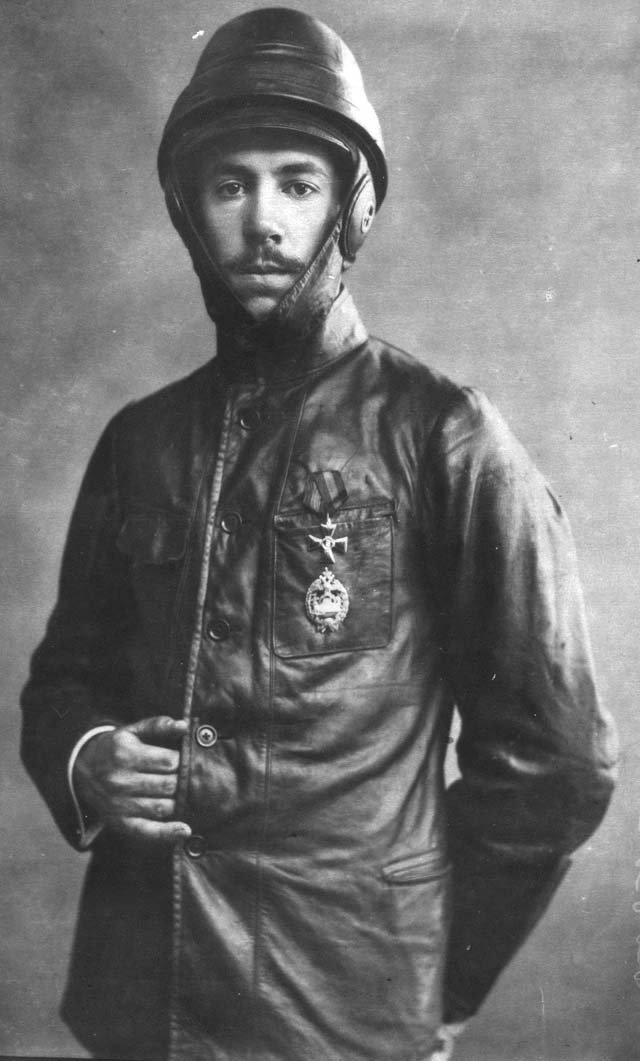
Sikorsky in 1914

With financial backing from his sister Olga, Sikorsky returned to Paris, the center of the aviation world at the time, in 1909. Sikorsky met with aviation pioneers, to ask them questions about aircraft and flying. In May 1909, he returned to Russia and began designing his first helicopter, which he began testing in July 1909. Powered by a 25-horsepower (19-kilowatt) Anzani engine, the helicopter used an upper and lower two-bladed lifting propeller that rotated in opposite directions at 160 rpm. The machine could only generate about 357 pounds-force (1,590 newtons) of lift, not enough to lift the approximate 457 pounds (207 kg) weight. Despite his progress in solving technical problems of control, Sikorsky realized that the aircraft would never fly. He finally disassembled the aircraft in October 1909, after he determined that he could learn nothing more from the design. In February 1910, he undertook to build a second helicopter, and his first airplane. By the spring, helicopter No. 2 could lift its weight of 400 pounds (180 kg), but not the additional weight of an operator.

I had learned enough to recognize that with the existing state of the art, engines, materials, and – most of all – the shortage of money and lack of experience... I would not be able to produce a successful helicopter at that time.

Sikorsky's first aircraft of his own design, the S-1, used a 15 hp (11 kW) Anzani 3-cylinder fan engine in a pusher configuration, that could not lift the aircraft. His second design, called the S-2, was powered by a 25 hp (19 kW) Anzani engine in a tractor configuration and first flew on June 3, 1910, at a height of a few feet. On June 30, after some modifications, Sikorsky reached an altitude of "sixty or eighty feet" before the S-2 stalled and was completely destroyed when it crashed in a ravine. Later, Sikorsky built the two-seat S-5, his first design not based on other European aircraft. Flying this original aircraft, Sikorsky earned his pilot license; Fédération Aéronautique Internationale (FAI) license No. 64 issued by the Imperial Aero Club of Russia in 1911. During a demonstration of the S-5, the engine quit and Sikorsky was forced to make a crash landing to avoid a wall. It was discovered that a mosquito in the gasoline had been drawn into the carburetor, starving the engine of fuel. The close call convinced Sikorsky of the need for an aircraft that could continue flying if it lost an engine. His next aircraft, the S-6 held three passengers and was selected as the winner of the Moscow aircraft exhibition held by the Russian Army in February 1912.

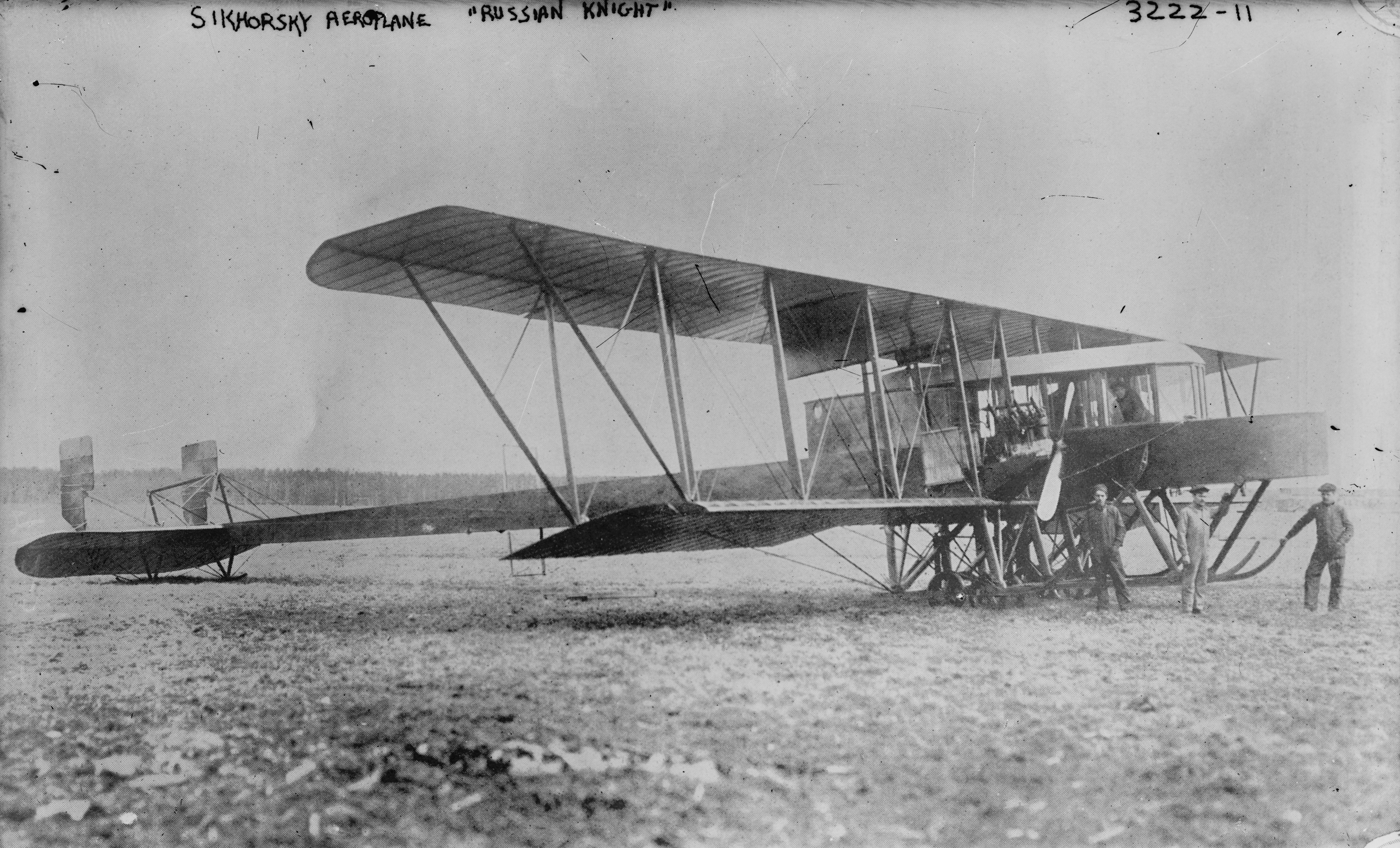
Sikorsky Bolshoi Baltisky of 1913, before receiving its pair of pusher engines

In early 1912, Igor Sikorsky became Chief Engineer of the aircraft division for the Russian Baltic Railroad Car Works (Russko-Baltiisky Vagonny Zavod or R-BVZ) in Saint Petersburg. His work at R-BVZ included the construction of the first four-cylinder aircraft, the S-21 Russky Vityaz, which he initially called Le Grand when fitted with just two engines, then the Bolshoi Baltisky (The Great Baltic) when fitted with four engines in two "push-pull" pairs, and finally Russki Vityaz in its four engine all tractor-engined configuration. He also served as the test pilot for its first flight on May 13, 1913. In recognition of his accomplishment, he was awarded an honorary degree in engineering from Saint Petersburg Polytechnical Institute in 1914. Sikorsky took the experience from building the Russky Vityaz to develop the S-22 Ilya Muromets airliner. Due to the outbreak of World War I, he redesigned it as the world's first four-engined bomber, for which he was decorated with the Order of St. Vladimir.

After World War I, Igor Sikorsky briefly became an engineer for the French forces in Russia, during the Russian Civil War. Seeing little opportunity for himself as an aircraft designer in war-torn Europe, and particularly Russia, ravaged by the Bolshevik Revolution and Russian Civil War, he emigrated to the United States, arriving in New York on March 30, 1919.

=== List of aircraft designed by Sikorsky ===
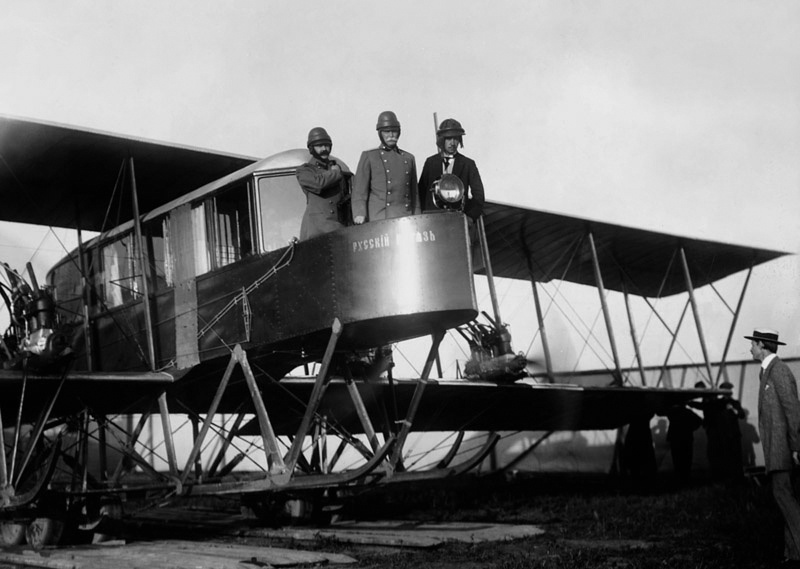
Russian aviators Sikorsky, Genner and Kaulbars aboard a "Russky Vityaz", c. 1913

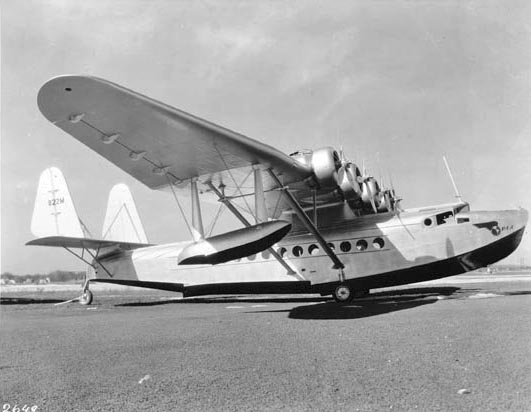
Sikorsky S-42 flying boat

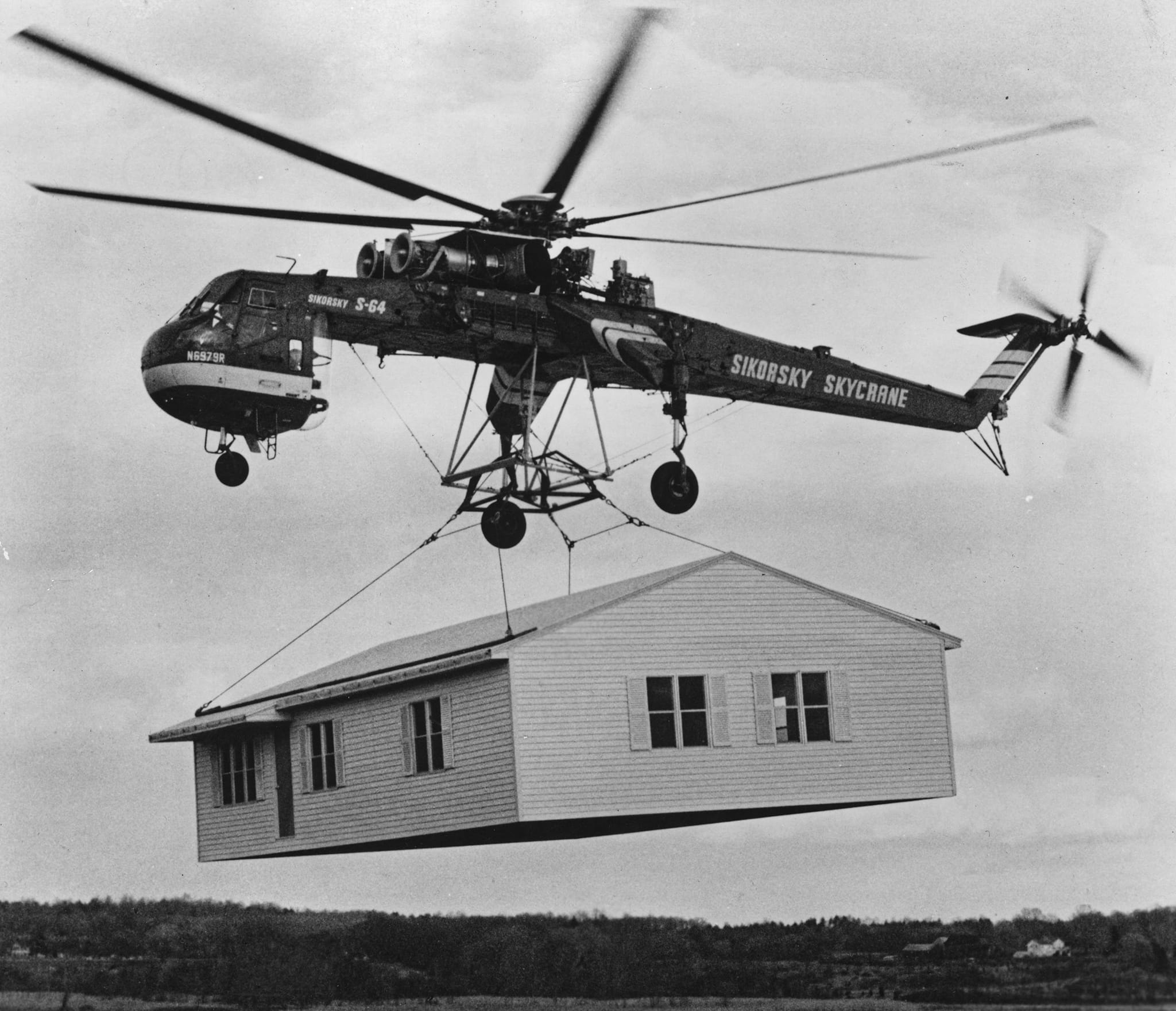
Sikorsky S-64 Skycrane carrying a house

- H-1 Sikorsky's first helicopter design, 1909
- H-2 Sikorsky's second helicopter design, 1910
- S-1 single-engine pusher biplane, Sikorsky's first fixed wing design, 1910
- S-2 single-engine tractor biplane developed from the S-1, 1910
- S-3 enlarged and improved version of the S-2, 1910
- S-4 one-seat, single-engine biplane concept developed from the S-3, never flown, 1911
- S-5 one-seat, single-engine biplane, Sikorsky's first practical aircraft, 1911
- S-6 three-seat, single-engine biplane, 1912
- S-7 two-seat, single-engine monoplane, 1912
- S-8 two-seat single-engine biplane trainer, 1912
- S-9 Krugly three-seat, single-engine monoplane, 1913
- S-10 five-seat, single-engine biplane reconnaissance/trainer developed from the S-6, 1913
- S-11 Polukrugly two-seat, single-engine mid-wing reconnaissance monoplane prototype, 1913
- S-12 one-seat, single-engine trainer, Sikorsky's most successful aircraft in Russia, 1913
- S-13 and S-14 proposed designs, never completed due to unavailability of engines
- S-15 single-engine light bomber floatplane, 1913
- S-16 two-seat, single-engine escort fighter, 1914–1915
- S-17 two-seat, single-engine reconnaissance biplane based on the S-10, 1915
- S-18 two-seat, twin-engine pusher biplane fighter/interceptor
- S-19 twin-engine biplane, 1916
- S-20 two-seat biplane fighter, 1916
- S-21 Russky Vityaz four-engine biplane airliner, first successful four engine aircraft, 1913
- S-22–S-27 Ilya Muromets four-engine biplane airliner and heavy bomber, 1913
- Avion Atlas proposed four-engined biplane bomber for France, cancelled due to the end of World.War I, 1918
- IS-27 Battleplane proposed four-engined biplane heavy bomber, developed from the Avion Atlas, for the USAAS, 1919
- S-28 projected four-engine biplane airliner; Sikorsky's first American design, 1919
- S-29-A twin-engine biplane airliner, 1924
- S-30 proposed twin engine biplane, 1925
- S-31 single engine sesquiplane, 1925
- S-32 single engine floatplane, 1926
- S-33 Messenger two-seat, single engine racer plane, 1925
- S-34 twin-engine amphibian, 1926
- S-35 trimotor built for René Fonck's attempt to win the Orteig Prize, 1926
- S-36 twin engine amphibian, 1927
- S-37 twin-engine built for René Fonck, but then converted to a passenger plane, 1927
- S-38 twin-engine ten-seat flying boat, 1928
- S-39 smaller single-engine version of the S-38, 1929
- S-40 four-engine amphibian built for Pan Am, 1931
- S-41 scaled-up monoplane version of the S-38, 1930
- S-42 Clipper – flying boat, 1934
- S-43 scaled-down version of S-42, 1934
- VS-300 experimental prototype helicopter, 1939
- VS-44 flying boat, 1942
- R-4 world's first production helicopter, 1942

== Life in the United States ==
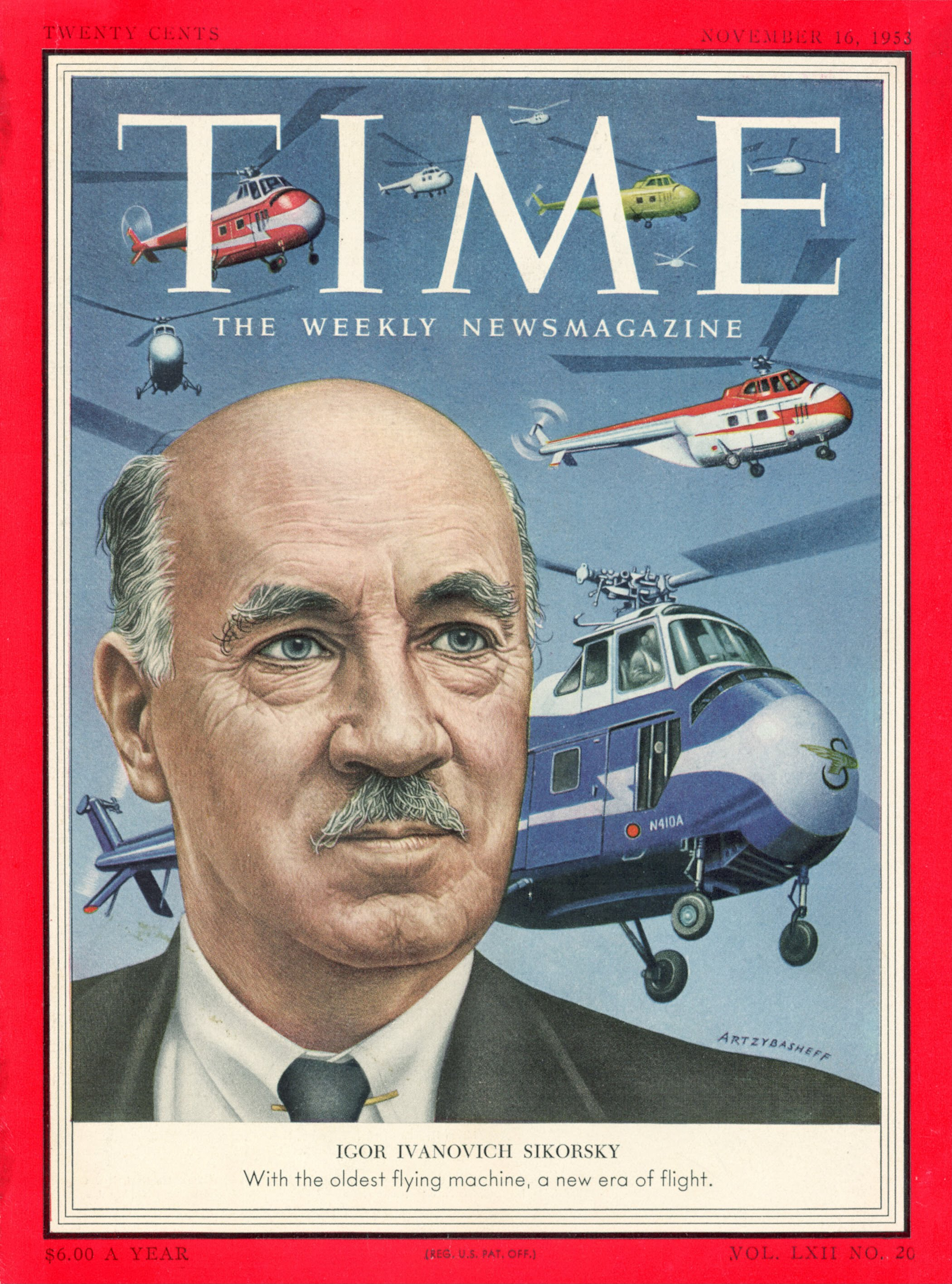
Igor Sikorsky on Time magazine cover, 1953

In the U.S., Sikorsky first worked as a school teacher and a lecturer, while looking for an opportunity to work in the aviation industry. In 1932, he joined the faculty of the University of Rhode Island to form an aeronautical engineering program and remained with the university until 1948. He also lectured at the University of Bridgeport.

In 1923, Sikorsky formed the Sikorsky Manufacturing Company in Roosevelt, New York. He was helped by several former Russian military officers. Among Sikorsky's chief supporters was composer Sergei Rachmaninoff, who introduced himself by writing a check for US$5,000 (equivalent to $94,482 in 2025). Although his prototype was damaged in its first test flight, Sikorsky persuaded his reluctant backers to invest another $2,500. With the additional funds, he produced the S-29, one of the first twin-engine aircraft in the U.S., with a capacity for 14 passengers and a speed of 115 mph. The performance of the S-29, slow when compared to military aircraft of 1918, proved to be a "make or break" moment for Sikorsky's funding.

In 1928, Sikorsky became a naturalized citizen of the United States. The Sikorsky Manufacturing Company moved to Stratford, Connecticut in 1929. It became a part of the United Aircraft and Transport Corporation (now United Technologies Corporation) in July of that year. The company manufactured flying boats, such as the S-42 "Clipper", used by Pan Am for transatlantic flights.

Meanwhile, Sikorsky also continued his earlier work on vertical flight while living in Nichols, Connecticut. On February 14, 1929, he filed an application to patent a "direct lift" amphibian aircraft which used compressed air to power a direct lift "propeller" and two smaller propellers for thrust. On June 27, 1931, Sikorsky filed for a patent for another "direct lift aircraft", and was awarded patent No. 1,994,488 on March 19, 1935. His design plans eventually culminated in the first (tethered) flight of the Vought-Sikorsky VS-300 on September 14, 1939, with the first free flight occurring eight months later on May 24, 1940. Sikorsky's success with the VS-300 led to the R-4, which became the world's first mass-produced helicopter, in 1942. Sikorsky's final VS-300 rotor configuration, comprising a single main rotor and a single antitorque tail rotor, has proven to be one of the most popular helicopter configurations, being used in most helicopters produced today.

== Personal life ==
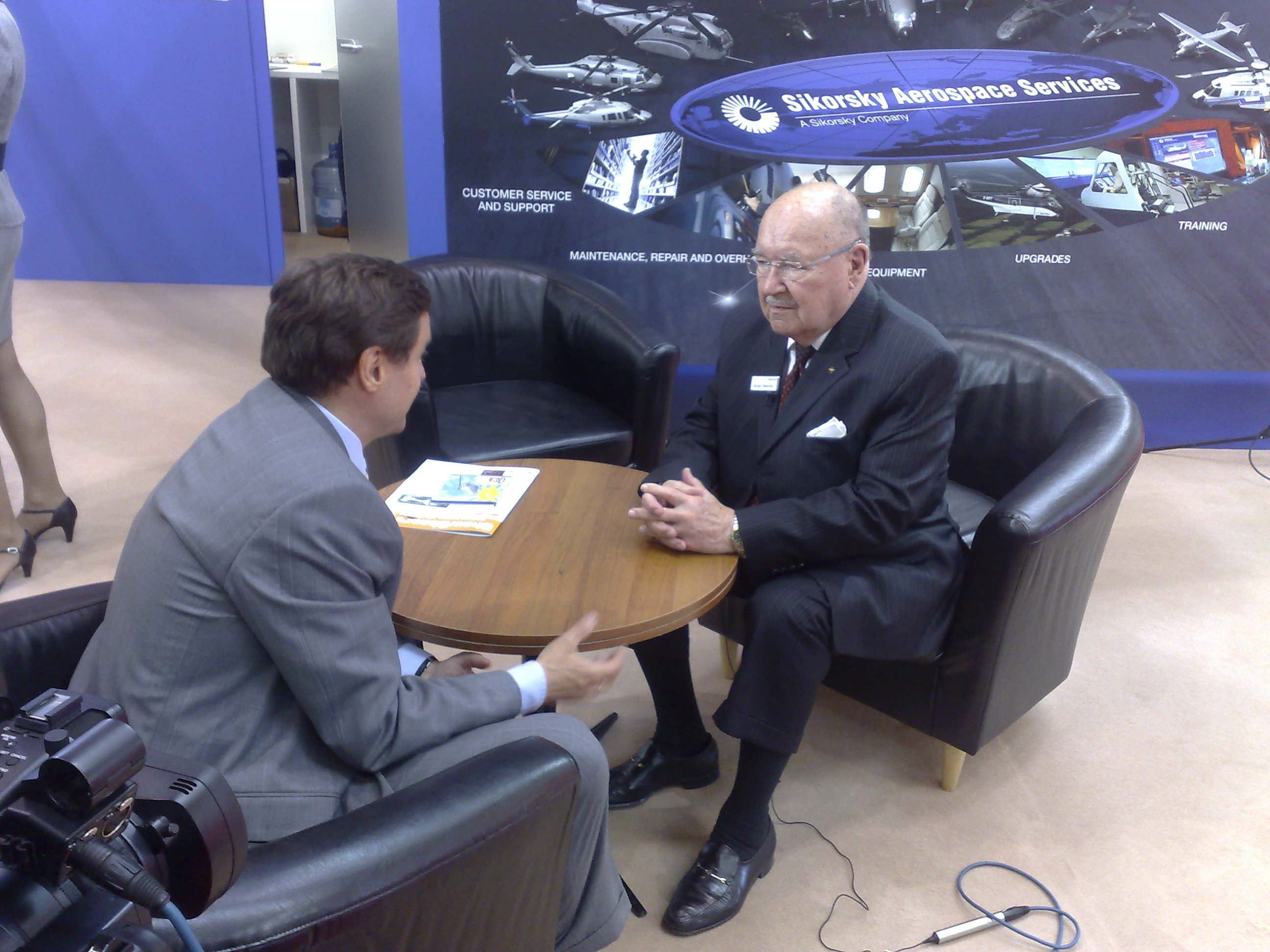
Sergei Sikorsky at the HeliRussia 2011 Exhibition in Moscow

Sikorsky was married to Olga Fyodorovna Simkovitch in the Russian Empire. They were divorced and Olga remained in Russia with their daughter, Tania, as Sikorsky departed following the Bolshevik Revolution in 1917. In 1923, Sikorsky's sisters immigrated to the U.S., bringing six-year-old Tania with them. Sikorsky married Elisabeth Semion (1903–1995) in 1924, in New York. Sikorsky and Elisabeth had four sons; Sergei, Nikolai, Igor Jr. and George.

- Tania Sikorsky von York (March 1, 1918 – September 22, 2008), Sikorsky's eldest child and only daughter. Tania was born in Kiev. Educated in the U.S., she earned a B.A. at Barnard College and a doctorate at Yale University. She was one of the original faculty members of Sacred Heart University in Bridgeport, Connecticut, where she served as Professor of Sociology for 20 years.
- Sergei Sikorsky (January 31, 1925 – September 18, 2025), Sikorsky's eldest son. He joined United Technologies in 1951 and retired in 1992, as Vice-President of Special Projects at Sikorsky Aircraft.
- Igor Sikorsky Jr. is an attorney, businessman and aviation historian. Igor Sikorsky III is also a pilot.

Sikorsky died at his home in Easton, Connecticut, on October 26, 1972, and is buried in Saint John the Baptist Russian Orthodox Cemetery, located on Nichols Avenue in Stratford.

== Legacy ==
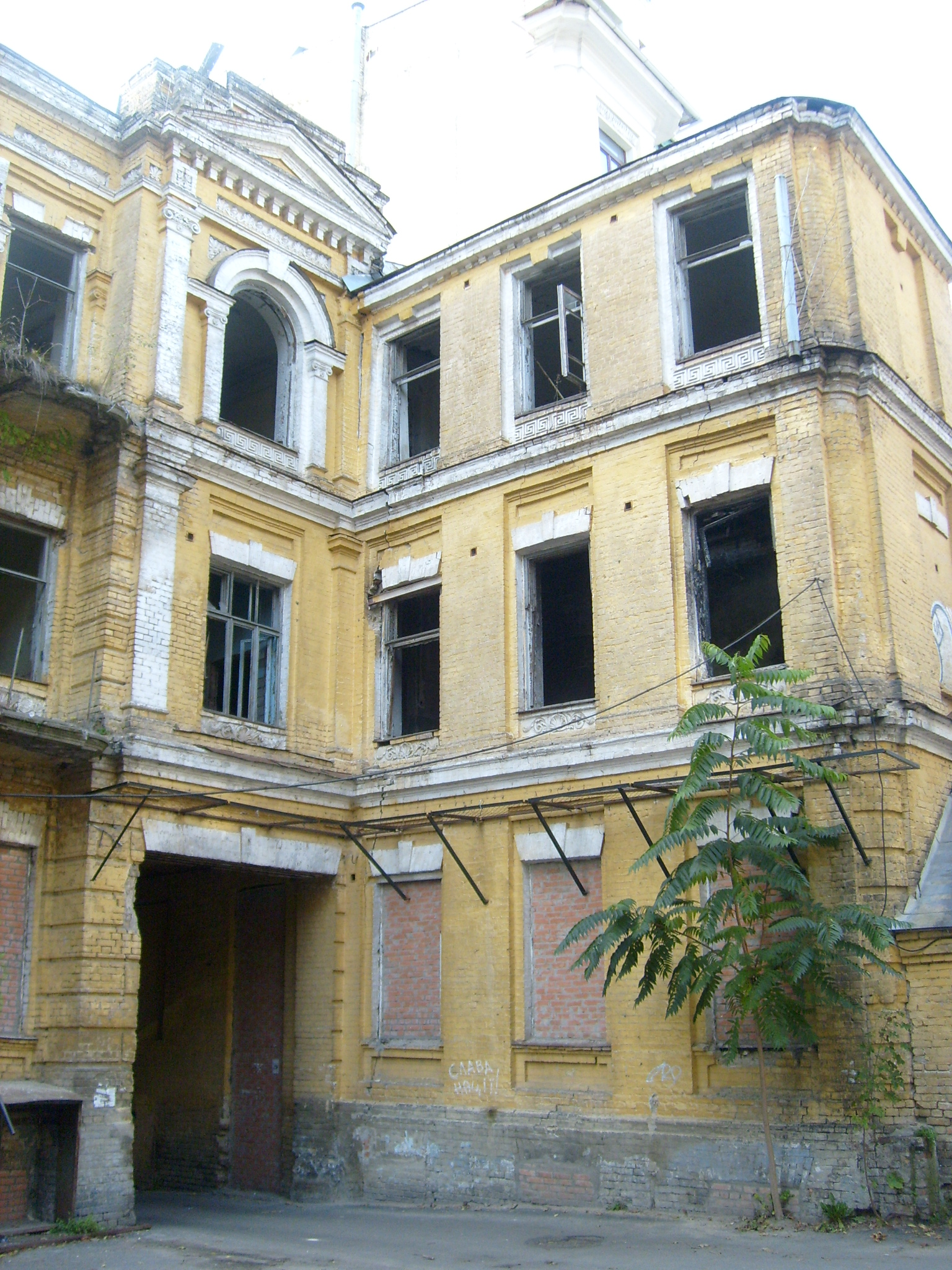
The Sikorsky's family house in the historical center of Kyiv, Ukraine, October 2009

In 1966, Sikorsky was inducted into the International Air & Space Hall of Fame.

Sikorsky's and Andrei Tupolev's professional careers were covered in the 1979 Soviet biopic The Poem of Wings (Russian: Поэма о крыльях), where Sikorsky was portrayed by Yury Yakovlev. A working model of Sikorsky Ilya Muromets was recreated for filming.

The Sikorsky Memorial Bridge, which carries the Merritt Parkway across the Housatonic River next to the Sikorsky corporate headquarters, is named for him. Sikorsky has been designated a Connecticut Aviation Pioneer by the Connecticut State Legislature. The Sikorsky Aircraft Corporation in Stratford, Connecticut, continues to the present day as one of the world's leading helicopter manufacturers, and a nearby small airport at Bridgeport has been named Sikorsky Memorial Airport.

Sikorsky was inducted into the National Inventors Hall of Fame and the Junior Achievement U.S. Business Hall of Fame in 1987.

10090 Sikorsky, a main-belt asteroid discovered in 1990 at the Crimean Astrophysical Observatory, was named in honor of him.

In October 2011, one of the streets in Kyiv, Ukraine, was renamed for Sikorsky. The decision was made by the City Council at the request of the U.S. Embassy in Ukraine, which opened its new office on that street. The Sikorsky's family house in the city's historical center is preserved to this day but is in a neglected condition pending restoration.

In November 2012, one of the Russian supersonic heavy strategic bomber Tu-160, based at the Engels-2 Air Force Base, was named for Igor Sikorsky, which caused controversy among air base crew members. One of the officers said that Igor Sikorsky does not deserve it because he laid the foundations of the U.S., rather than Russian aviation. However, the Long Range Aviation command officer said that Igor Sikorsky is not responsible for the activities of his military aircraft, noted that Sikorsky had also designed the first heavy bomber for Russia. In 2013, Flying magazine ranked Sikorsky number 12 on its list of the 51 Heroes of Aviation.

In August 2016, the National technical university of Ukraine "Kyiv politechnical institute" was named National Technical University of Ukraine "Igor Sikorsky Kyiv Polytechnic Institute" after its former student and outstanding aircraft designer.

On March 22, 2018, the Kyiv City Council officially renamed Kyiv International Airport to "Igor Sikorsky Kyiv International Airport Zhuliany".

== Philosophical and religious views ==
Sikorsky was a deeply religious Russian Orthodox Christian, and authored two religious and philosophical books (The Message of the Lord's Prayer and The Invisible Encounter). Summarizing his beliefs, in the latter he wrote:

Our concerns sink into insignificance when compared with the eternal value of human personality — a potential child of God which is destined to triumph over life, pain, and death. No one can take this sublime meaning of life away from us, and this is the one thing that matters.

== Published works ==
- Sikorsky, Igor, "The Coming Air War", The Atlantic Monthly, September 1942 (as told to Frederick C. Painton)
- Sikorsky, Igor Ivan. The Message of the Lord's Prayer. New York: C. Scribner's sons, 1942. OCLC 2928920
- Sikorsky, Igor Ivan. The Invisible Encounter. New York: C. Scribner's Sons, 1947. OCLC 1446225
- Sikorsky, Igor Ivan. The Story of the Winged-S: Late Developments and Recent Photographs of the Helicopter, an Autobiography. New York: Dodd, Mead, 1967. OCLC 1396277

== See also ==
- Aerosledge – Sikorsky built some of these propeller-powered snowmobiles in 1909–10
- Fedor Ivanovich Bylinkin – an early aircraft collaborator with Sikorsky, in 1910
- Sikorsky Prize – a prize for human powered helicopters named in his honor
- 10090 Sikorsky – an asteroid named in honor of Igor Sikorsky

== Sources ==
- Delear, Frank J. Igor Sikorsky: His Three Careers in Aviation. New York: Dodd Mead, 1969, Revised edition, 1976. ISBN 978-0-396-07282-9.
- Hacker, Barton C. and Margaret Vining. American Military Technology: The Life Story of a Technology. Baltimore, Maryland: Johns Hopkins University Press, 2007. ISBN 978-0-8018-8772-7.
- Ikenson, Ben. Patents: Ingenious Inventions, How They Work and How They Came to Be. New York: Black Dog & Leventhal Publishers, 2004. ISBN 978-1-57912-367-3.
- Lake, Jon. The Great Book of Bombers: The World's Most Important Bombers from World War I to the Present Day. St. Paul, Minnesota: MBI Publishing Company, 2002. ISBN 0-7603-1347-4.
- Leishman, J. Gordon. "The Dream of True Flight." Online summary: Principles of Helicopter Aerodynamics. Cambridge, UK: Cambridge University Press, 2006. ISBN 0-521-85860-7.
- Murphy, Justin D. Military Aircraft, Origins to 1918: An Illustrated History of Their Impact (Weapons and warfare series). Santa Barbara, California, USA: ABC-CLIO, 2005. ISBN 1-85109-488-1.
- Sikorsky, Igor Ivan. The Story of the Winged-S: Late Developments and Recent Photographs of the Helicopter, an Autobiography. New York: Dodd, Mead, originally published 1938 (updated editions, various years up to 1948), Revised edition, 1967.
- Spenser, Jay P. Whirlybirds, A History of the U.S. Helicopter Pioneers. Seattle, Washington, USA: University of Washington Press, 1998. ISBN 0-295-97699-3.
- Woods, Carlos C. "Memorial Tributes", pp. 253–266. Igor Ivan Sikorsky. Washington, D.C.: National Academy of Engineering (The Academy), 1979.
- Ukrainian Congress Committee of America (1978). "Sikorsky". The Ukrainian Quarterly. 34–35 (1). ISSN 0041-6010.
- U.S. patent 2,318,259
- U.S. patent 2,318,260
