= Sikorsky S-17 =

S-17
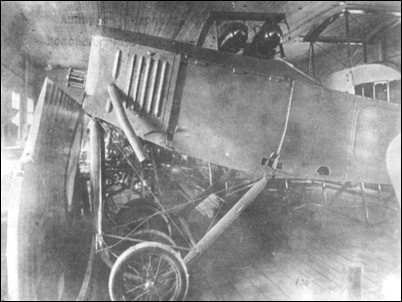
- Sikorsky S-17 circa 1915

General information
- Type: Reconnaissance
- National origin: Russian Empire
- Manufacturer: Russian Baltic Railroad Car Works
- Designer: Igor Sikorsky
- Number built: 2

History
- First flight: 1915

The Sikorsky S-17 was a Russian single engine aircraft built at the Russian Baltic Railroad Car Works in Petrograd while Igor Sikorsky was the chief engineer of the aircraft manufacturing division.

== Design and development ==
The S-17 was a two seat reconnaissance biplane based on the S-10 and powered by a Sunbeam Crusader V-8 water-cooled engine rated at 150 hp (112 kW).

== Specifications ==
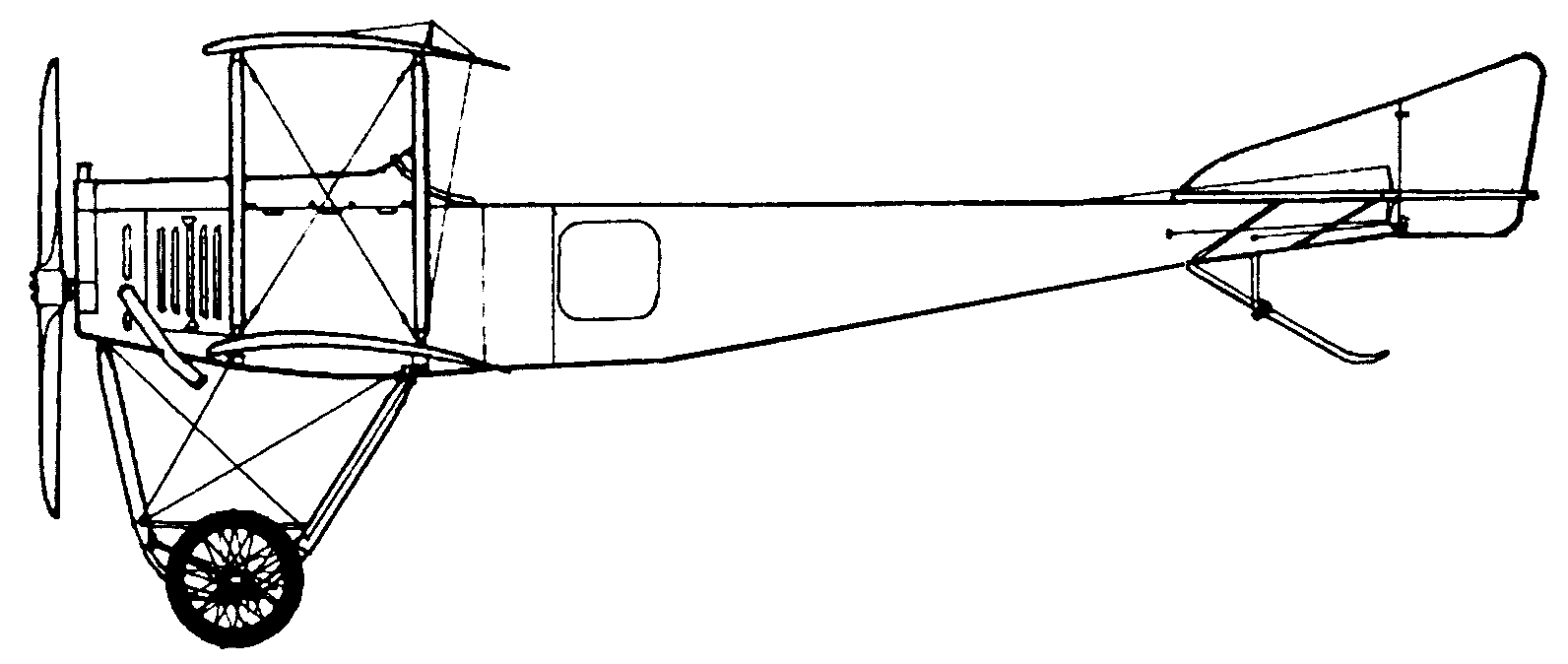

Data from Russian Aviation Museum

General characteristics

- Crew: Two
- Length: 24 ft 7 in (7.5 m)
- Upper wingspan: 45 ft 3 in (13.8 m)
- Lower wingspan: 41 ft 0 in (12.5 m)
- Wing area: 468 sq ft (43.5 m^{2})
- Empty weight: 1,863 lb (845 kg)
- Gross weight: 2,624 lb (1,190 kg)
- Powerplant: 1 × Sunbeam Crusader V-8, side-valve, water-cooled, piston engine, 150 hp (110 kW)
- Propellers: 2-bladed

Performance

- Wing loading: 5.6 lb/sq ft (27.4 kg/m^{2}) max load
