= Sikorsky S-15 =

S-15

General information
- Type: Light bomber
- National origin: Russian Empire
- Manufacturer: Russian Baltic Railroad Car Works
- Designer: Igor Sikorsky
- Number built: 1

History
- First flight: 1913

The Sikorsky S-15 was a single engine light bomber floatplane built in 1913 at the Russian Baltic Railroad Car Works while Igor Sikorsky was the chief engineer of the aircraft manufacturing division. Similar in design to the Sikorsky S-10, only one example of this biplane was produced.
