= Sikorsky S-19 =

S-19
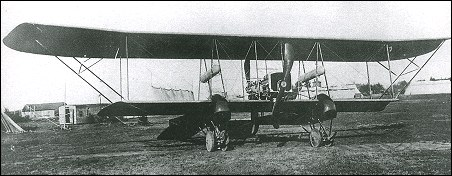

General information
- Type: Experimental prototype
- National origin: Russian Empire
- Manufacturer: Russian Baltic Railroad Car Works
- Number built: 1

History
- First flight: 1916

The Sikorsky S-19 was a Russian twin-engine experimental prototype biplane aircraft built late in 1916 by the Russian Baltic Railroad Car Works while Igor Sikorsky was chief engineer of the aircraft manufacturing division.

== Design and development ==
The S-19 was a two bay biplane powered by two 150 horsepower (112 kilowatts) Sunbeam Crusader water-cooled V-8 engines installed in a push-pull configuration. Arranged as a twin-boom aircraft, it had a large rudder located in the center of the empenage. Two crew members occupied cockpits in the forward-most section of the booms in front of the lower wing and served as pilot and machine gunner.

Flight testing revealed sluggish performance and the aircraft was scrapped after a minor crash.

== See also ==
Gotha WD.3
