= Sikorsky S-18 =

S-18
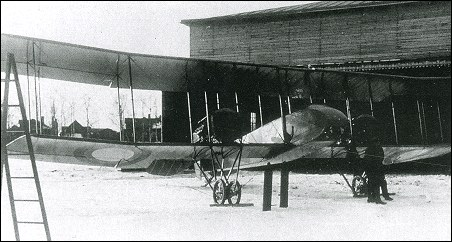
- Sikorsky S-18

General information
- Type: Fighter
- National origin: Russian Empire
- Manufacturer: Russian Baltic Railroad Car Works
- Designer: Igor Sikorsky
- Number built: 2

The Sikorsky S-18 was a Russian twin engine aircraft designed by Igor Sikorsky and built by the Russian Baltic Railroad Car Works aviation division at Petrograd during World War I.

== Design and development ==
The S-18 was a large three bay biplane fighter/interceptor powered by two 150 hp (112 kW) Sunbeam Crusader V-8 water-cooled engines mounted on the lower wing in a pusher configuration. The aircraft featured armor protection for both crew members with the gunner/observer seated in the nose and armed with a single machine gun. The aircraft was very heavy and with the less than reliable Sunbeam engines neither example built was able to leave the ground.

== Specifications ==
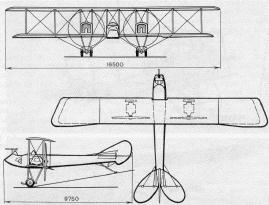

Data from Russian Aviation Museum

General characteristics

- Crew: Two
- Length: 31 ft 10 in (9.7 m)
- Upper wingspan: 54 ft 2 in (16.5 m)
- Lower wingspan: 50 ft 2 in (15.3 m)
- Wing area: 620 sq ft (58 m^{2})
- Empty weight: 3,274 lb (1,485 kg)
- Gross weight: 4,630 lb (2,100 kg)
- Powerplant: 2 × Sunbeam Crusader V-8, side-valve, water-cooled, piston engine, 150 hp (110 kW) each

Performance

- Wing loading: 7.4 lb/sq ft (36.2 kg/m^{2}) max load
