= S28 =

S28 may refer to:

== Aviation ==
- Blériot-SPAD S.28, a French long-distance biplane
- International Peace Garden Airport in Rolette County, North Dakota
- Letov Š-28, a Czechoslovak reconnaissance biplane
- Sikorsky S-28, a proposed French biplane bomber

== Rail ==
- S28 (Rhine-Ruhr S-Bahn), a service in Germany
- S28, an Aargau S-Bahn service in Switzerland

== Roads ==
- County Route S28 (California)
- New Jersey Route 18, partially designated S28 until 1953
- Northern Airport Expressway, China

== Science ==
- 40S ribosomal protein S28
- British NVC community S28, a swamps and tall-herb fens community in the British National Vegetation Classification system
- S28: After contact with skin, wash immediately with plenty of ... (to be specified by the manufacturer), a safety phrase
- Sulfur-28, an isotope of sulfur

== Other uses ==
- HMS Vanguard (S28), a submarine of the Royal Navy
- Mena Station, in Rankoshi, Isoya District, Hokkaido, Japan
- SREC (file format), an ASCII encoding format for binary data
- USS S-28 (SS-133), a submarine of the United States Navy
