= S17 =

S17 may refer to:

== Aviation ==
- Rans S-17 Stinger, an American ultralight aircraft
- Saab 17, a Swedish reconnaissance aircraft
- Short S.17 Kent, a British flying boat airliner
- SIAI S.17, an Italian racing flying boat
- Sikorsky S-17, a Russian biplane
- Twin Lakes Airport (South Carolina), in Aiken County, South Carolina, United States

== Rail and transit ==
- Funabori Station, in Edogawa, Tokyo, Japan
- Gorō Station, in Ōzu, Ehime Prefecture, Japan
- Nippombashi Station, in Chūō-ku, Osaka, Japan
- Nonami Station, in Tempaku-ku, Nagoya, Aichi Prefecture, Japan
- Ranshima Station, in Otaru, Hokkaido, Japan
- S17 (St. Gallen S-Bahn), of the St. Gallen S-Bahn in Switzerland
- S17 (ZVV), a designation of the Wohlen–Dietikon railway line, of the Zürich S-Bahn in Switzerland

== Roads ==
- S17 Baicheng Ring Expressway, China
- Expressway S17 (Poland)
- County Route S17 (California), United States

== Vessels ==
- Greek submarine Amfitriti (S-17)
- HMS Ocelot (S17), a submarine of the Royal Navy
- SMS S17 (1912), a torpedo boat of the Imperial German Navy
- USS S-17 (SS-122), a submarine of the United States Navy

== Other uses ==
- 40S ribosomal protein S17
- British NVC community S17, a swamps and tall-herb fens community in the British National Vegetation Classification system
- S17: Keep away from combustible material, a safety phrase
- S17, a postcode district in Sheffield, England
