= Sikorsky S-10 =

S-10
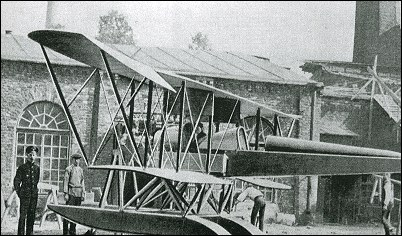

General information
- Type: Reconnaissance seaplane and trainer
- National origin: Russian Empire
- Manufacturer: Russian Baltic Railroad Car Works
- Designer: Igor Sikorsky
- Primary user: Russian Navy
- Number built: 16

History
- Introduction date: 1913
- Retired: 1916
- Developed from: Sikorsky S-6

The Sikorsky S-10 was a Russian military twin-float seaplane that served with the Russian Navy's Baltic Fleet from the summer of 1913 to 1915. After Igor Sikorsky built the successful Sikorsky S-6 for the Russian military, he tried to build another successful aircraft for them. The S-10 was a modified S-6B built by the Russo-Baltic Carriage Factory. Approximately sixteen production versions of the S-10 were built. It had a less powerful engine and generally weaker structure than the S-6. They had either an 80 hp Gnome Monosoupape or a 100 hp Argus Motoren engine. Some were deployed on the world's first operational seaplane carriers.

== Development ==
Sikorsky built a special S-10 for the 1913 military aircraft competition. This particular S-10 had an 80 HP Gnome engine. The wing span was increased by 150 mm and were fitted with outer panels that could be folded for storage. The two seats were fitted side-by-side, and the yoke could be switched between the pilot and co-pilot during flight.

The aircraft also took the first prize in the competition although it lacked the speed and manoeuvrability of the S-6B. Its payload of 48% of the aircraft weight was exceptional. After its wingspan had been reduced by another 3050 mm and the Gnome engine was replaced by a stronger Monosoupape engine, the S-10 served as both a reconnaissance and trainer on floats with the Baltic Fleet.

== Records ==
Russian test pilot Gleb Alekhnovich set a Russian record by flying non-stop 500 km in 4 hours 56 minutes and 12 seconds with the S-10.

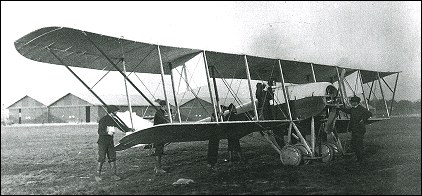
Sikorsky S-10 in land based configuration

== Operators ==
Russian Empire

- Russian Navy
  - Baltic Fleet

== Specifications (S-X with monosoupape engine) ==
Data from History of aircraft construction in the USSR

General characteristics

- Crew: 2
- Capacity: 3
- Length: 8 m (26 ft 3 in)
- Wingspan: 16.9 m (55 ft 5 in)
- Wing area: 16.9 m^{2} (182 sq ft)
- Empty weight: 567 kg (1,250 lb)
- Gross weight: 1,011 kg (2,229 lb)
- Powerplant: 1 × Gnome Monosoupape 7 Type A 7-cylinder air-cooled rotary piston engine, 60 kW (80 hp)

or 100 hp (75 kW) Argus As I

- Propellers: 2-bladed fixed-pitch propeller

Performance

- Maximum speed: 99 km/h (62 mph, 53 kn)
- Range: 500 km (310 mi, 270 nmi)
- Time to altitude: 500 m (1,600 ft) in 5 minutes 20 seconds
- Wing loading: 22 kg/m^{2} (4.5 lb/sq ft)
- Power/mass: 0.06 kW/kg (0.036 hp/lb)

== See also ==
- Sikorsky Aircraft
