= Vought-Sikorsky VS-300 =

Experimental helicopter in the US

VS-300
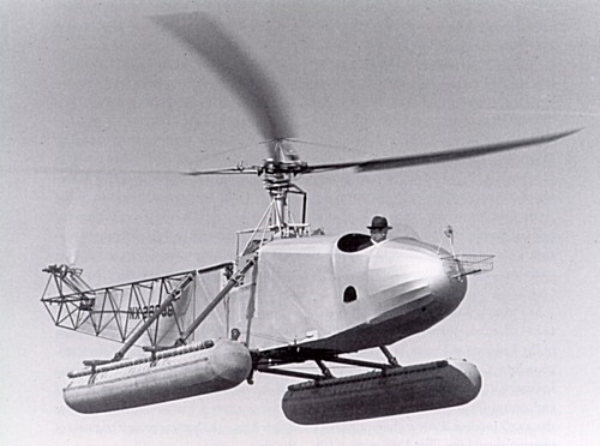
- One of the first flights of the VS-300

General information
- Type: Experimental helicopter
- National origin: United States
- Manufacturer: Vought-Sikorsky
- Designer: Igor Sikorsky

History
- First flight: 14 September 1939
- Developed into: Sikorsky R-4

The Vought-Sikorsky VS-300 (or S-46) is an American single-engine helicopter designed by Igor Sikorsky. It had a single three-blade rotor originally powered by a 75 horsepower (56 kW) engine. The first "free" flight of the VS-300 was on 13 May 1940. The VS-300 was the first successful single lifting rotor helicopter in the United States and the first successful helicopter to use a single vertical-plane tail rotor configuration for antitorque. With floats attached, it became the first practical amphibious helicopter.

== Design and development ==
Igor Sikorsky's quest for a practical helicopter began in 1938, when as the Engineering Manager of the Vought-Sikorsky Division of United Aircraft Corporation, he was able to convince the directors of United Aircraft that his years of study and research into rotary-wing flight problems would lead to a breakthrough. His first experimental machine, the VS-300, was test flown by Sikorsky on 14 September 1939, tethered by cables. In developing the concept of rotary-wing flight, Sikorsky was the first to introduce a single engine to power both the main and tail rotor systems. The only previous successful attempt at a single-lift rotor helicopter, the Yuriev-Cheremukhin TsAGI-1EA in 1931 in the Soviet Union, used a pair of uprated, Russian-built Gnome Monosoupape rotary engines of 120 hp each for its power. For later flights of his VS-300, Sikorsky also added a vertical airfoil surface to the end of the tail to assist anti-torque but this was later removed when it proved to be ineffective.

The cyclic control was found to be difficult to perfect, and led to Sikorsky locking the cyclic and adding two smaller vertical-axis lifting rotors to either side aft of the tailboom. By varying pitch of these rotors simultaneously, fore and aft control was provided. Roll control was provided by differential pitching of the blades. In this configuration, it was found that the VS-300 could not fly forward easily and Sikorsky joked about turning the pilot's seat around.

== Operational history ==
Sikorsky fitted utility floats (also called pontoons) to the VS-300 and performed a water landing and takeoff on 17 April 1941, making it the first practical amphibious helicopter. On 6 May 1941, the VS-300 beat the world endurance record held by the Focke-Wulf Fw 61, by staying aloft for 1 hour 32 minutes and 26.1 seconds. A two-seater version was delivered to the US Army in May 1942.

The final variant of the VS-300 was powered by a 150 hp Franklin engine. The VS-300 was one of the first helicopters capable of carrying cargo. The VS-300 was modified over a two-year period, including the removal of the two vertical tail rotors, in 1941, when a new cyclic control system gave it much-improved flight behavior.

== Surviving aircraft ==
In 1943, the VS-300 was retired to the Henry Ford Museum in Dearborn, Michigan. It has been on display there ever since, except for a trip back to the Sikorsky Aircraft plant for restoration in 1985.

== Specifications (VS-300) ==
Data from

General characteristics

- Crew: one
- Length: 28 ft 0 in (8.53 m)
- Height: 10 ft 0 in (3.05 m)
- Gross weight: 1,150 lb (522 kg)
- Powerplant: 1 × Franklin 4AC-199-E , 90 hp (67 kW) at 2,500 rpm
- Main rotor diameter: 30 ft 0 in (9.14 m)

Performance

- Maximum speed: 50 mph (80 km/h, 43 kn)
- Range: 75 mi (121 km, 65 nmi)
- Endurance: 1 hour 30 minutes

== See also ==
Related development

- Sikorsky R-4

Aircraft of comparable role, configuration, and era

- Bell 30

Related lists

- List of single seat helicopters
