= Sikorsky S-29-A =

American biplane airliner (1925–29)

S-29-A
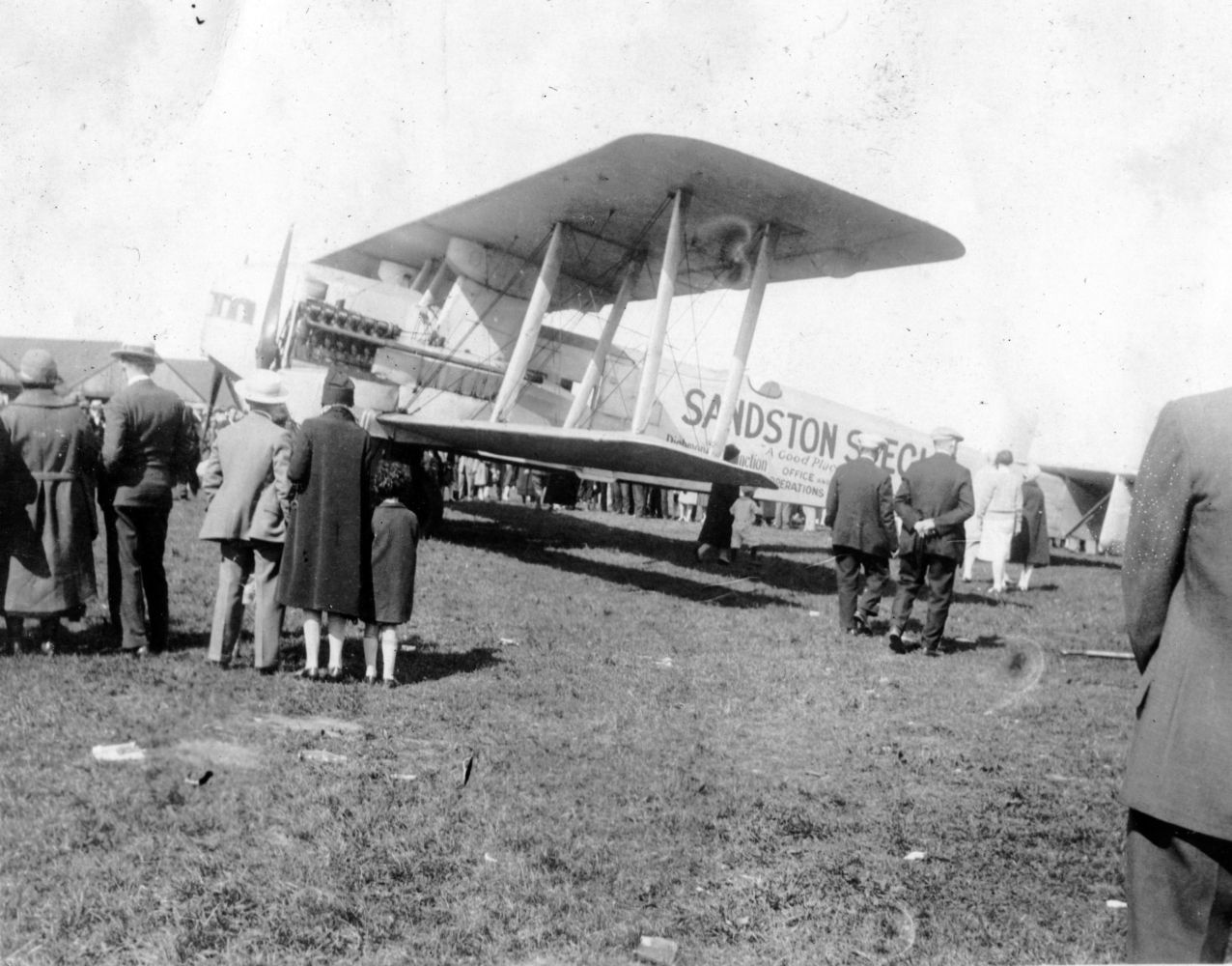

General information
- Type: Biplane airliner
- National origin: United States
- Manufacturer: Sikorsky
- Designer: Igor Sikorsky
- Status: Crashed, damaged beyond repair
- Number built: 1

History
- First flight: 4 May 1924

The Sikorsky S-29-A was a twin-engine sesquiplane airliner, first flown in 1924. It was the first aircraft that aviation pioneer Igor Sikorsky designed and built after coming to the United States, hence the special "-A" suffix signifying "America". The aircraft made many successful long-range flights, most of which Sikorsky piloted himself. The S-29-A claims a number of "firsts" in aviation, including the first twin-engine aircraft capable of maintaining altitude on one engine, the first aircraft to broadcast a radio musical program in-flight, in 1925 and in 1926 the first aircraft to display a motion picture in flight. The S-29-A was also one of the first aircraft to make use of an airstair door, located on the starboard side of the fuselage.

== Design and development ==
Sikorsky and his colleagues began work on the machine in the spring of 1923 on a farm near Roosevelt Field on Long Island. The aircraft structure was manufactured from steel with the two bay wire-braced strutted wings made from wood and fabric. The machine featured a twin vertical stabilizer design and was originally fitted with a pair of Hispano-Suiza 8 engines rated at 220 hp (160 kW) each. The pilot and mechanic sat in an open cockpit halfway between the main wings and the tail, while up to 14 passengers were accommodated forward within the streamlined fuselage.

During the winter of 1923–24 work on the project came to a near stand still due to financial concerns. The famed Russian composer Sergei Rachmaninoff appeared one day and after a discussion with Sikorsky he donated $5,000 to complete the S-29-A. The first flight, piloted by Sikorsky, was on May 4, 1924 and resulted in a forced landing on a golf course, seriously damaging the aircraft. The crash was caused by low engine speed leading to insufficient thrust due to excessive pitch of the propellers. After rebuilding the aircraft, two 400 hp (300 kW) Liberty L-12 engines were installed. The second flight on September 25 was very successful. Flight testing revealed that the S-29-A was able to maintain altitude on one engine at a speed of 75 mph (121 km/h).

== Operational history ==
On April 23, 1925 the S-29-A completed its first revenue flight from New York to Washington D.C. The cargo consisted of two Baby Grand pianos, one of which was delivered to the first lady Grace Coolidge. On May 8, 1925 a regular passenger service between New York and Yorktown Virginia began, and the S-29-A was officially christened the Yorktown at Bolling Field in Washington, DC. The aircraft made over 300 successful flights, but with the airline industry only just emerging in the United States at that time, the S-29 failed to attract the customers that Sikorsky had hoped.

Eventually Sikorsky sold the S-29-A to Roscoe Turner in 1927 (some sources state 1926), and it had a varied career in merchandising (Curlee Clothing) and acting as a flying cigar store (among other roles).

On April 3, 1928 Turner sold the aircraft to the Caddo Company, Inc. of Hollywood, CA. The President of Caddo, Howard Hughes intended to use it in the making of the movie Hell's Angels. The S-29-A was painted and modified to resemble a Gotha heavy bomber. During filming of a dangerous diving spinning stunt on March 22, 1929 at Pacoima, California the linen of the left wing began tearing, and parts of the left engine cowling separated. The pilot, Al Wilson, intended to bail out, and asked the engineer, Phil Jones, to do so as well. According to reports, the engineer did not hear the order coming from the pilot, who abandoned the aircraft shortly later. The aircraft then entered to an uncontrolled descent and crashed, killing the engineer. The pilot parachuted to the ground, uninjured.

== Specifications ==
Data from Sikorsky American Fixed-Wing Aircraft

General characteristics

- Crew: 2
- Capacity: 14 passengers
- Length: 49 ft 10 in (15.19 m)
- Upper wingspan: 69 ft 0 in (21.03 m)
- Lower wingspan: 62 ft 6 in (19.05 m)
- Height: 13 ft 6 in (4.11 m)
- Wing area: 987 sq ft (91.7 m^{2})
- Empty weight: 7,775 lb (3,527 kg)
- Gross weight: 12,000 lb (5,443 kg)
- Powerplant: 2 × Liberty L-12 water-cooled V12 engines, 400 hp (300 kW) each
- Propellers: 2-bladed, 10 ft 4 in (3.15 m) diameter

Performance

- Maximum speed: 115 mph (185 km/h, 100 kn)
- Cruise speed: 100 mph (160 km/h, 87 kn)
- Stall speed: 56 mph (90 km/h, 49 kn)
- Service ceiling: 12,300 ft (3,700 m)
- Time to altitude:
  - 8.8 min to 5,000 ft (1,500 m)
  - 23 min to 10,000 ft (3,000 m)
