= Amphibious helicopter =

Helicopter operable from both land and water

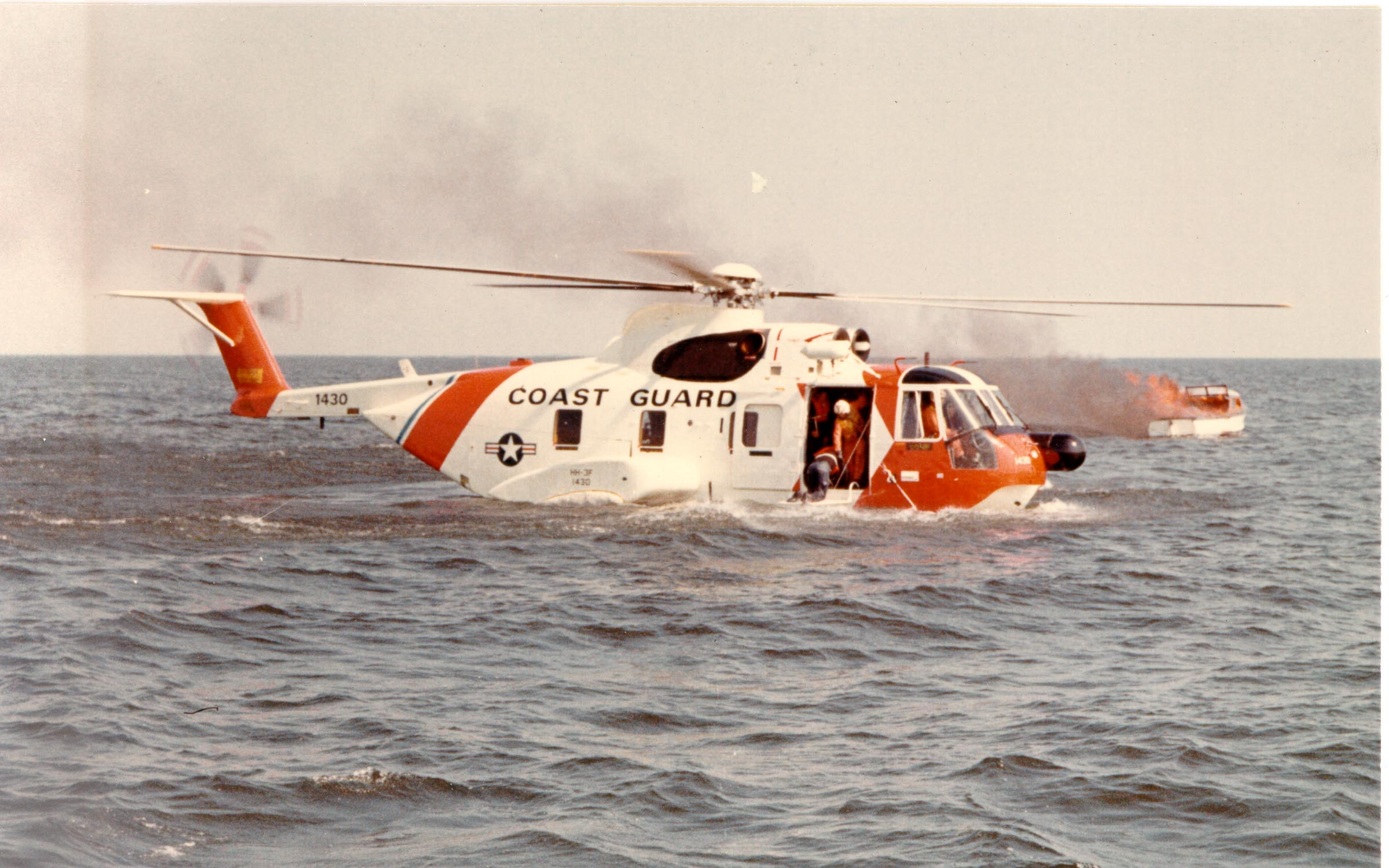
An HH-3F Pelican helicopter of the United States Coast Guard lands on the water near a burning boat.

An amphibious helicopter is a helicopter that is intended to land on and take off from both land and water. Amphibious helicopters are used for a variety of specialized purposes including air-sea rescue, marine salvage and oceanography, in addition to other tasks that can be accomplished with any non-amphibious helicopter. An amphibious helicopter can be designed with a waterproof or water-resistant hull like a flying boat or it can be fitted with utility floats in the same manner as a floatplane.

== Development ==
Helicopters have taken a primary role in air-sea rescue since their introduction in the 1940s. Helicopters can fly in rougher weather than fixed-wing aircraft, have the advantage of VTOL, and can deliver injured passengers directly to hospitals or other emergency facilities (requiring no runway or airport). A practical amphibious helicopter first appeared in 1941 and the water-landing feature soon proved its worth. Non-amphibious helicopters were required to hover above the scene of a water accident and utilize a hoist but amphibious helicopters were capable of setting down on the water to effect a rescue more directly.

== Fitted floats ==
In 1941, Igor Sikorsky fitted utility floats (also called pontoons) to the Vought-Sikorsky VS-300, making the first practical amphibious helicopter. In the 1940s and 1950s, some models of helicopter such as the Bell 47 and 48 and the Sikorsky R-4 and R-6 were fitted with utility floats so that they could rest on both water and land.

Pontoons can be filled with air or they can be utilized for storage of fuel or supplies. In 1949, Sikorsky produced the H-5H with both wheels and pontoons.

== Boat hull design ==
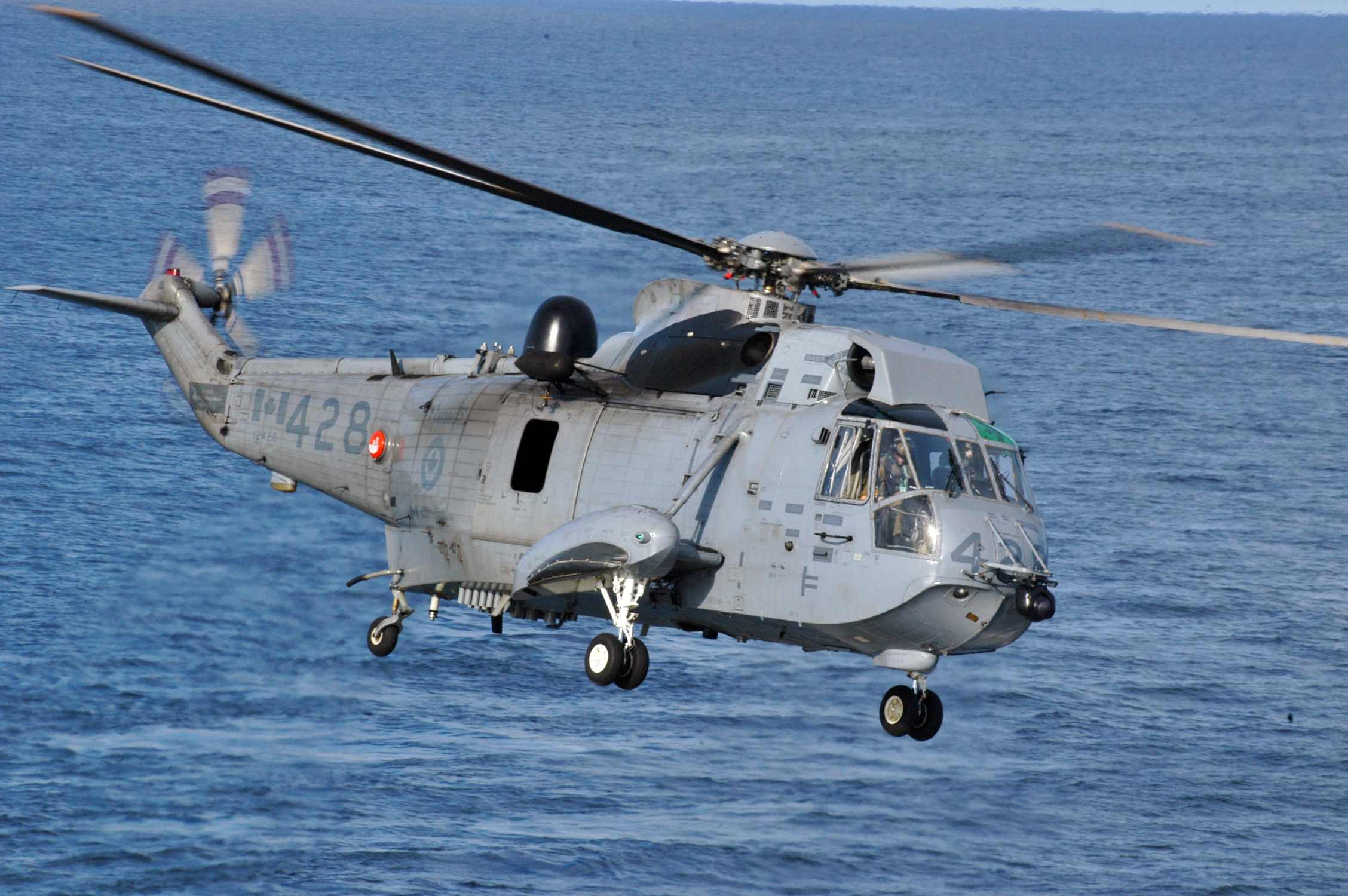
A Canadian Forces CH-124 Sea King shows its boat hull, sponsons and wheeled landing gear.

The Sikorsky S-62 Seaguard was the first amphibious helicopter made with a flying boat hull—the prototype flew in 1958. Utilizing many components of the earlier S-55, the S-62 proved the idea, and Sikorsky flew their S-61 Sea King prototype in 1959 for the U.S. Navy, a model intended for anti-submarine warfare. Both the S-62 and S-61 were ready for delivery in 1961. Sikorsky produced 1100 S-61s, including some that were not watertight: a longer cargo-carrying version was given rear doors and a ramp. Sikorsky licensed other manufacturers such as Agusta, Mitsubishi and Westland to produce variants of the S-61.

Amphibious helicopters came into their own in the 1960s when robust boat-hulled designs were produced in quantity for military and civilian operators. Amphibious helicopters paid dividends for rescue personnel who enjoyed greater safety and success during operations. Overwater operations that used non-amphibious helicopters relied to a higher degree on hoists, rescue baskets, and rescue swimmers. Nevertheless, beginning in the 1970s, amphibious models were steadily replaced by helicopter models unable to land on water, because of high amphibious aircraft development costs. The last amphibious helicopter model used by the United States Coast Guard was the Sikorsky HH-3F Pelican, retired in 1994.

Resting on the surface of the water with the rotor stopped, in conditions of brisk wind and mounting surface waves, a boat-hulled helicopter with stabilizing floats on either side is less likely to remain upright than a non-boat helicopter fitted with utility pontoons. Difficulty in lifting off can be encountered, especially when heavily loaded or in increasing seas.

The Canadian Forces developed a technique called water bird for landing their CH-124 Sea Kings in water.

== Limited water capability ==
Helicopters can be designed to withstand limited contact with the surface of a body of water. The 1958 Vertol HUP-2 was an amphibious development of the twin-rotor Piasecki H-25 which strengthened its hull and replaced lower nose windows with tough aluminum. The HUP-2 was provided with a pair of stabilizing outrigger floats positioned amidships. The HUP-2 was able to taxi forward or backward on water, regardless of wind direction.

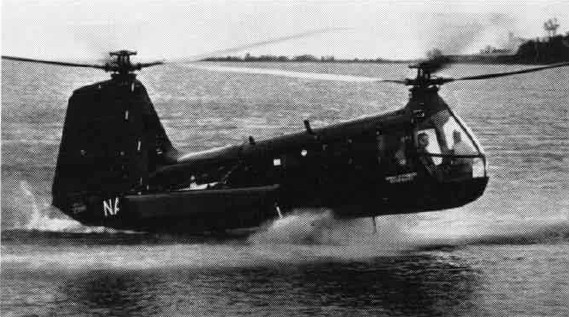
A Vertol HUP Retriever lands on water

The CH-46 Sea Knight and its Canadian variant, the CH-113 Labrador, can land on water and rest for up to two hours in calm water. The rear sponsons hold two of the three landing gear units as well as self-sealing fuel tanks. The helicopter began service with the United States Marine Corps in 1962, and with the Canadian military in 1963, and is used to carry cargo and combat troops.

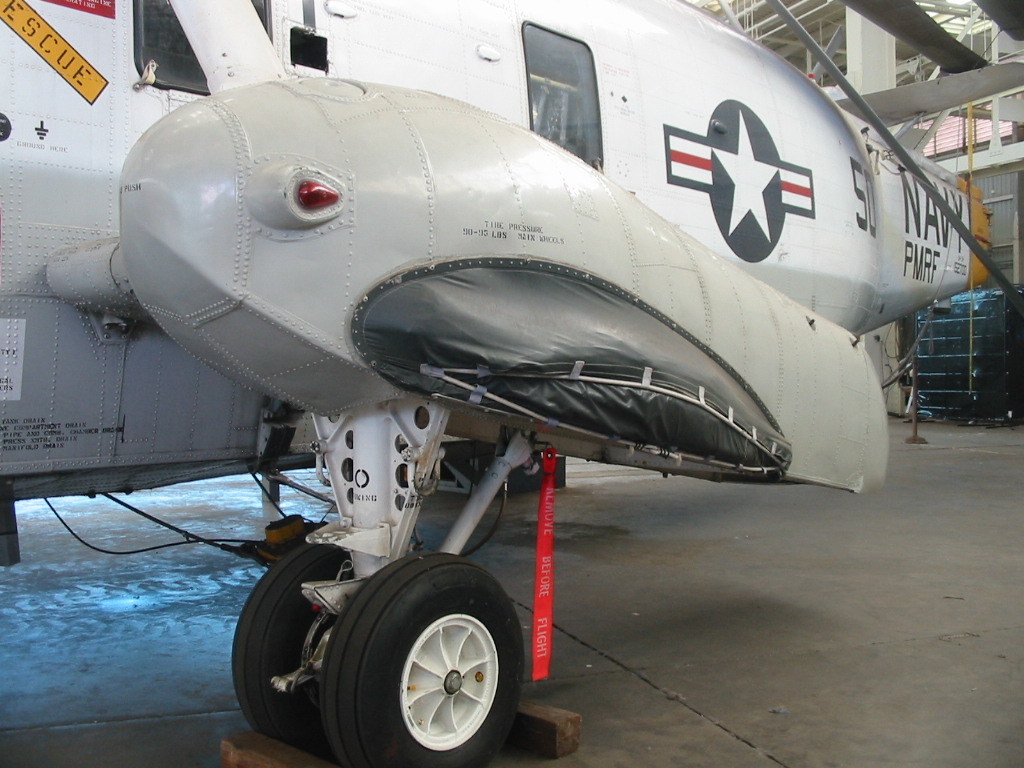
A Sikorsky Sea King with an added inflatable emergency float outboard of the standard sponson, intended to increase flotation time

The Boeing CH-47 Chinook was made sufficiently watertight to allow it to land on water for a short time in carrying out covert operations and special military missions. Buoyancy was increased with sealed compartments inside sponsons which extended most of the way along each side of the fuselage. For extended water usage, Boeing offered a kit to enhance its water resistance. The Sikorsky CH-53 Sea Stallion, first introduced in 1966, is also capable of limited water landing.

== Roles ==
Amphibious helicopters have been used in a variety of roles, including air-sea rescue, anti-submarine warfare, supporting special forces operations, and transporting the US president.

== Examples ==
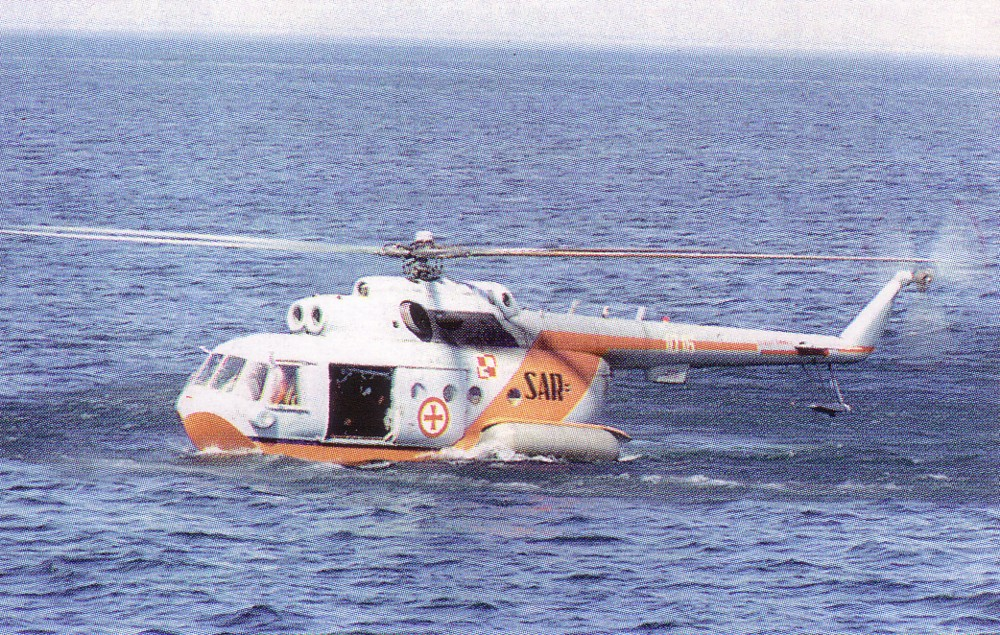
A Polish Mil Mi-14

Boat-hulled

- Aérospatiale Super Frelon
  - Changhe Aircraft Industry Group Changhe Z-8 (Z-8A, Z-8F and Z-8AEW) – Chinese built variant of Super Frelon
- Mil Mi-14 Haze
- Sikorsky S-62/HH-52A Seaguard
- Sikorsky SH-3 Sea King
  - Sikorsky CH-124 Sea King – Canadian built version
  - Sikorsky S-61 - Civilian version
  - Westland Sea King - British built version
- Sikorsky HH-3F Pelican

== See also ==
- Amphibious aircraft
- Amphibious vehicle
