= Sikorsky S-30 =

S-30

General information
- Type: Light transport
- National origin: United States
- Manufacturer: Sikorsky Manufacturing Corporation
- Designer: Igor Sikorsky

The Sikorsky S-30 was a proposed aircraft design by Igor Sikorsky to be built by the Sikorsky Manufacturing Corporation at Roosevelt, New York in 1925. The twin engine biplane was to have been used on mail routes or configured as a commercial passenger airliner. No examples of the S-30 were ever manufactured.

== Specifications ==
Data from Aerofiles

General characteristics

- Crew: Two
- Capacity: 10 passengers or 1,800 pounds (820 kg)
- Powerplant: 2 × Wright R-790 Whirlwind Air-cooled 9-cylinder radial engines, 200 hp (150 kW) each

Performance

- Cruise speed: 100 mph (160 km/h, 87 kn)
- Range: 500 mi (800 km, 430 nmi)
