= Sikorsky S-31 =

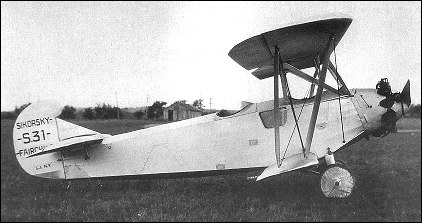

General information
- Type: Civil utility sesquiplane
- National origin: United States
- Manufacturer: Sikorsky Manufacturing Corporation
- Number built: 1

History
- First flight: September 1925

The Sikorsky S-31 was a 1920s American sesquiplane designed and built by the Sikorsky Manufacturing Corporation and configured for aerial photography.

== Design and development ==
The S-31 was a sesquiplane built for photographic work by the Fairchild Flying Corporation. It had two open cockpits and a cabin for the photographic equipment. The S-31 was powered by a 200 hp (149 kW) Wright Whirlwind J-4 engine and first flew in September 1925. Following participation in the New York Air Races in October 1925 it was shipped to Brazil to be used by Fairchild for aerial photographic work. At some point the S-31 had twin Lewis machine guns ring-mounted on the rear cockpit.

== Specifications ==
Data from

General characteristics

- Crew: two
- Length: 26 ft 0 in (7.92 m)
- Wingspan: 45 ft 0 in (13.72 m)
- Height: 10 ft 4 in (3.15 m)
- Wing area: 260 sq ft (24.15 m^{2})
- Empty weight: 1,700 lb (771 kg)
- Gross weight: 2,900 lb (1,315 kg)
- Powerplant: 1 × Wright Whirlwind J-4 , 200 hp (149 kW)

Performance

- Maximum speed: 35 mph (56.3 km/h, 30 kn)
- Endurance: 6 hours 0 minutes
- Service ceiling: 15,000 ft (4,572 m)
