= Sikorsky S-5 =

Russian single seat biplane design

S-5
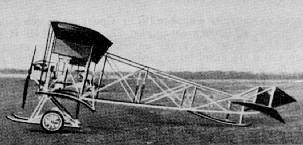

General information
- Type: Prototype
- Designer: Igor Sikorsky
- Status: destroyed in crash during testing
- Number built: 1

History
- First flight: April 1911

The Sikorsky S-5 was an early Russian single seat biplane design by Igor Sikorsky, completed in late April 1911.

== Design and development ==
The S-5 was powered by a 50 hp (37 kW) Argus water-cooled engine turning a propeller Sikorsky designed and built himself. The fabric covering the wooden wings was tightened with pure alcohol and glue mixed with boiling water. The fuselage structure was left exposed. Instead of separate levers to control the elevator and ailerons as in his previous aircraft, Sikorsky designed a single control lever with a wheel allowing control of pitch and roll. This "control column" included a button switch to momentarily deactivate the ignition thereby controlling engine power. The rudder controls were reversed, because it better suited Sikorsky's tactility of the machine.

== Operational history ==
The S-5 was tested in a series of 20 to 30-second straight-line flights, over a period of three weeks, before the designer was able to make what he called his first real flight of four minutes, in a circuit of the field, on 17 May 1911.

After outperforming Imperial Russian Army aircraft during manoeuvres watched by Czar Nicholas II in September, the S-5 earned Igor Sikorsky his first income with a series of exhibition flights during a country fair at Belaya Tserkov, near Kiev. Between nine and ten flying hours were logged before the S-5 was lost in late fall. The crash was caused by fuel starvation due to debris (a mosquito) blocking the carburetor jet.

== Specifications ==
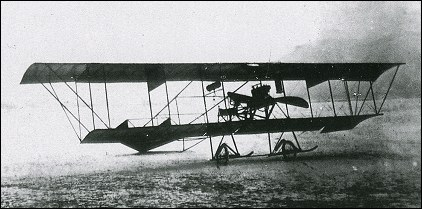
Front view of Igor Sikorsky's S-5

Data from The Osprey Encyclopaedia of Russian Aircraft 1875–1995

General characteristics

- Crew: 1
- Capacity: 1 passenger
- Length: 8.5 m (27 ft 11 in)
- Wingspan: 12 m (39 ft 4 in)
- Gross weight: 440 kg (970 lb)
- Powerplant: 1 × Argus 1908 4-cylinder 4-cyl. inline water-cooled piston engine, 37 kW (50 hp)

Performance

- Maximum speed: 125 km/h (78 mph, 67 kn)
- Range: 85 km (53 mi, 46 nmi)
- Service ceiling: 500 m (1,600 ft)
