= Sikorsky S-32 =

American single engine aircraft

S-32
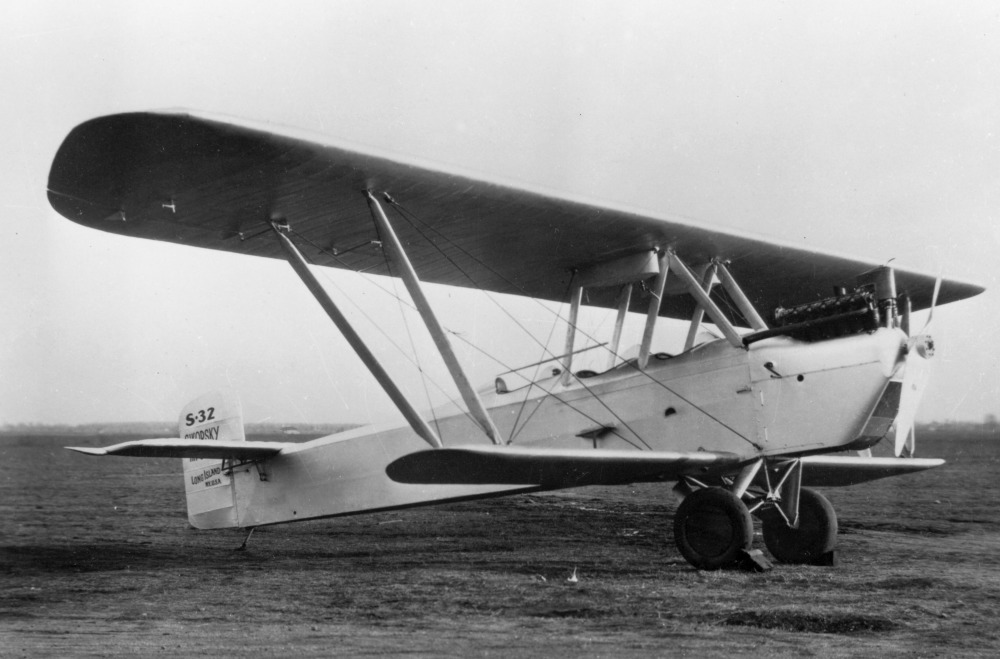

General information
- Type: Utility
- National origin: United States
- Manufacturer: Sikorsky
- Number built: 1

History
- Introduction date: 1926
- First flight: 1926

The Sikorsky S-32 was an American single engine aircraft built by the Sikorsky Manufacturing Corporation in 1926.

== Design and development ==
The S-32 was a large single-bay sesquiplane using parallel interplane struts and bracing wires with three open cockpits, the rearmost cockpit for a pilot and two forward cockpits capable of holding two passengers each. The fuselage and wing were constructed from metal and covered with fabric. Powered by a 400 horsepower (298 kilowatts) Liberty L-12 water-cooled V-12, it was built for the Andean National Corporation to explore Colombia and served as a floatplane fitted with pontoons.

== Specifications (S-32) ==
Data from 1000aircraftphotos

General characteristics

- Crew: One
- Capacity: 4 passengers
- Length: 36 ft (11 m)
- Upper wingspan: 58 ft 4 in (17.78 m)
- Lower wingspan: 38 ft (12 m)
- Empty weight: 3,300 lb (1,497 kg)
- Gross weight: 5,400 lb (2,449 kg)
- Powerplant: 1 × Liberty L-12 water-cooled 45° V-12, 400 hp (300 kW)

Performance

- Maximum speed: 133 mph (214 km/h, 116 kn)
- Stall speed: 40 mph (64 km/h, 35 kn)
- Endurance: 4 hours
- Service ceiling: 16,000 ft (4,900 m)
