= Sikorsky S-6 =

19811 Russian experimental aircraft

S-6
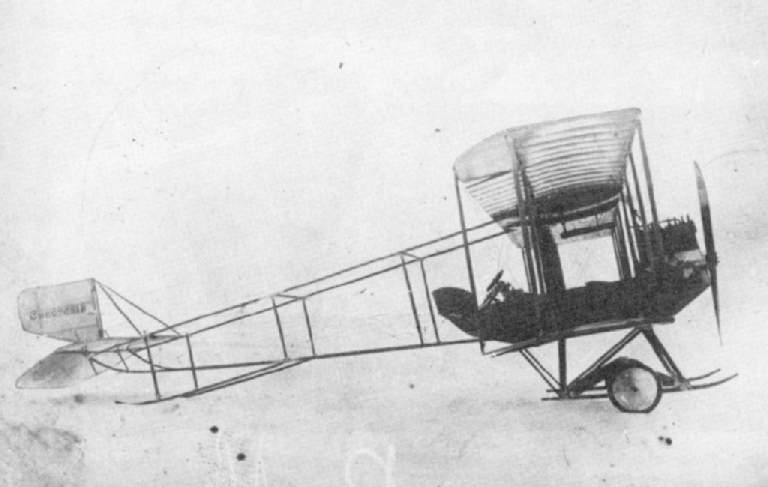
- S-6 with exposed fuselage structure

General information
- Type: Experimental
- National origin: Russian Empire
- Designer: Igor Sikorsky
- Number built: 5

History
- First flight: 1911
- Developed from: Sikorsky S-5

The Sikorsky S-6 was a Russian single engine experimental aircraft similar to the S-5, built in 1911 by Igor Sikorsky.

== Design and development ==
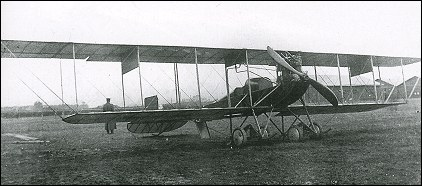
S-6-B with larger wing and enclosed fuselage

Construction of the first S-6 was started in August 1911. The three bay biplane was powered by an Argus 4-cylinder water-cooled engine producing 100 hp (75 kW). Initial flight tests in late November were disappointing, revealing a long take-off run and poor climb performance. Sikorsky disassembled the aircraft and took it home where substantial modifications were undertaken, including lengthening the wingspan and reducing aerodynamic drag by enclosing the fuselage with wood veneer. Ailerons on the lower wing were removed and strut bracing wires were arranged in pairs with wooden spacers between them, further reducing drag.

Sikorsky now called the machine the S-6-A and it exhibited remarkable improvement. During one flight with three men on board the aircraft registered a speed of 113 kilometres per hour (70 mph), exceeding the world record at that time and in February 1912 the S-6-A earned the highest award at the 1912 Moscow Aviation Exhibition.

In late spring 1912 Sikorsky began working at the Russian Baltic Railroad Car Works as chief engineer of the aircraft manufacturing division. Work was started on a refined version of the S-6-A called the S-6-B with strengthened landing gear and a mechanism to permit starting the engine from the cockpit. Completed in July, the S-6-B was entered in the international military competition at Saint Petersburg in August and flown by Sikorsky. The S-6-B reached a speed of 113 km/h (61 kn; 70 mph) while carrying a 327 kg (721 lb) load, climbed to 1,500 m (4,900 ft) in fifteen minutes and displayed an endurance of greater than 90 minutes. At the end of the competition on 30 September the S-6-B was announced the winner leading to "an order for a few" more of the type.

== Specifications (first aircraft) ==
Data from Russian Aviation Museum

General characteristics

- Crew: One
- Capacity: Two passengers
- Length: 28 ft 10 in (8.8 m)
- Upper wingspan: 38 ft 9 in (11.8 m)
- Wing area: 381 sq ft (35.4 m^{2})
- Empty weight: 1,433 lb (650 kg)
- Gross weight: 1,984 lb (900 kg)
- Powerplant: 1 × Argus 1908 4-cylinder 4-cyl. inline water-cooled piston engine, 100 hp (75 kW)

Performance

- Maximum speed: 111 mph (179 km/h, 96 kn)
