= Sikorsky S-28 =

Proposed four engine biplane bomber aircraft

S-28

General information
- Type: Proposed Biplane Bomber
- National origin: France
- Designer: Igor Sikorsky
- Status: None built, order cancelled

The Sikorsky S-28 was a proposed four engine biplane bomber aircraft designed by Igor Sikorsky to be built in France during World War I. Sikorsky moved to France in March 1918 and soon met with officers of the Armée de l'Air who asked him to design an aircraft capable of carrying a new 1,000 kg (2,200 lb) bomb. Although the aircraft was initially designed to be powered by two Liberty L-12 engines, the technical section of the Armée de l'Air suggested using four Hispano-Suiza 8 engines instead.

By early August 1918 Sikorsky's plans were completed and the project was approved. The French ordered five examples and preparations were made to start construction, but the order was cancelled when World War I ended and no S-28s were completed.
