= Sunbeam Crusader =

Early British V8 airplane engine from 1912 to 1916

Crusader
- Type: V8, 90 degree, water-cooled, piston engine
- National origin: United Kingdom
- Manufacturer: Sunbeam
- Designer: Louis Coatalen
- First run: December 1912
- Manufactured: 1912 - July 1916
- Number built: 228+

The Sunbeam Crusader, originally known as the Sunbeam 150 hp, Sunbeam 110 hp or Sunbeam 100 hp (variations on the engine may also have been referred to as Sunbeam 120 hp or Sunbeam 135 hp), was an early British, side-valve, water-cooled, V8 aero engine first marketed in 1913.

== Design and development ==
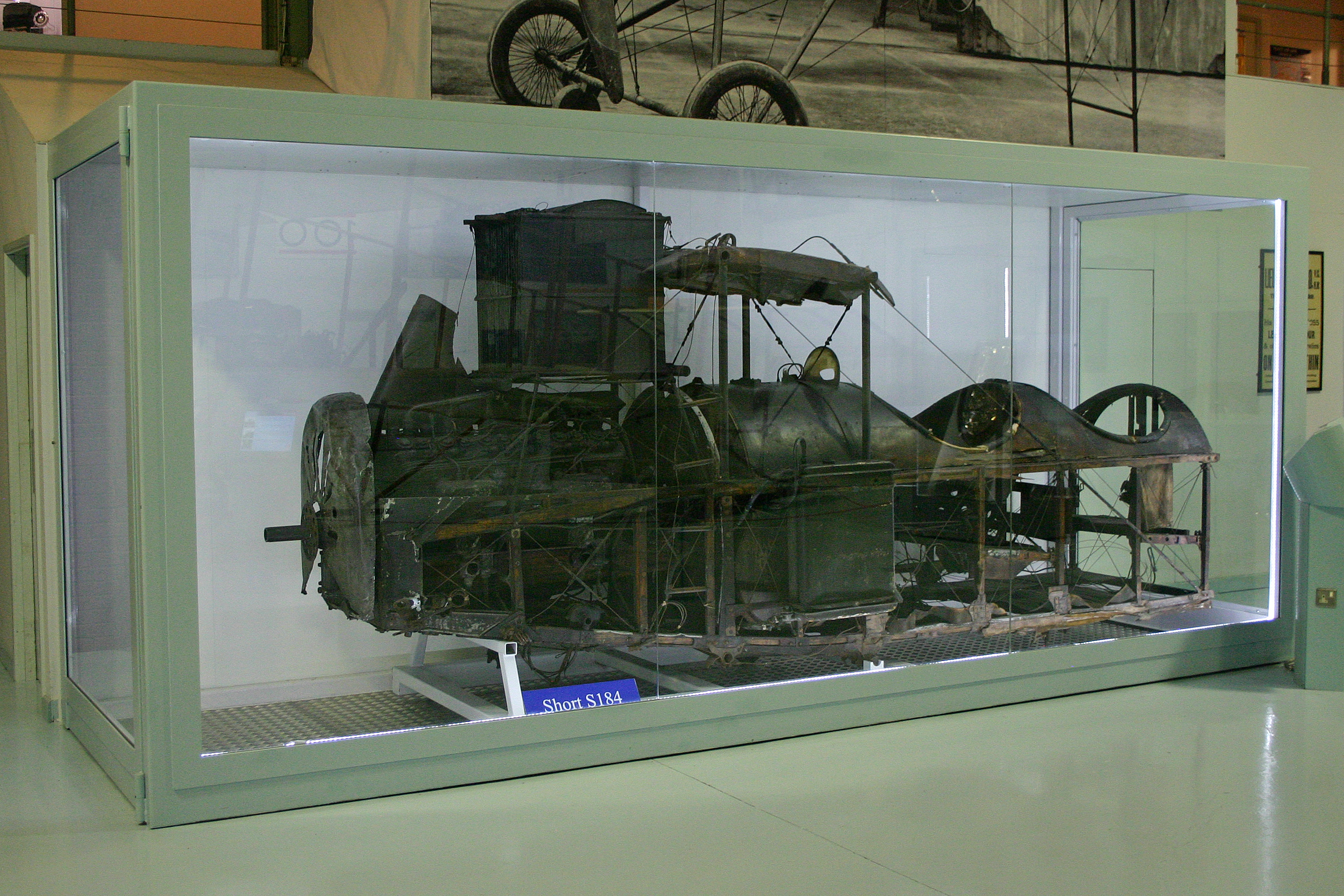
A Sunbeam Gurkha in the remains of a Short Type 184 at the Fleet Air Arm Museum. While Frederick Rutland's aeroplane survived the First World War intact, it was damaged by bombing during the Second World War.

The first aero-engine from Louis Coatalen was the 110 hp, a water-cooled V8 with side-valve cylinders of 80mm (3.15 in) bore and 150mm (5.9 in) stroke. The later versions of the engine, which had 90mm (3.5 in) bore cylinders, were known as the 150 hp until the Sunbeam naming system labelled it the Crusader in 1917. The 80mm bore versions were produced in limited numbers, mostly for civil use, but later 90mm bore engines had limited success in civil applications, with more than 226 built for military aircraft.

Production examples were rated at 150 hp (112 kW) at 2,000 rpm, had a bore of 90mm (3.5 in), stroke of 150mm (5.9 in), two valves per cylinder, and weighed 480 lb (220 kg) dry. The engine was used in a wide variety of British military aircraft during the first years of World War I, most notably the Short 827 seaplane for which six of the original versions were ordered followed by 107 of the more powerful type.

Further development of the Crusader resulted in the Sunbeam Zulu and V12 Sunbeam Mohawk and Sunbeam Gurkha. The Gurkha engine preserved at the Fleet Air Arm Museum, Yeovilton, Somerset, England, is the only surviving Sunbeam side-valve engine in the UK. It is installed in the Short 184, aircraft number 8359, that played a minor role in the Battle of Jutland at the end of May 1916. The pilot on that occasion was Flight Lieutenant Frederick Rutland (who was ever after known as "Rutland of Jutland"),

== Variants ==
A Sunbeam Mohawk on display at the Polish Aviation Museum.

110 hp
Early versions of the V8 side-valve engine with 80mm (3.15in) bore, variations were rated at 100 hp (75 kW), 110 hp (82 kW) and 120 hp (89 kW).
150 hp
Introduced late in 1914, the 90mm (3.5in) bore versions were referred to as the 150hp and could be rated at 135 hp (101 kW) or 150 hp (112 kW).
160 hp
Original designation for the 100mm (3.94in) bore Sunbeam Zulu, derivative of the Crusader.
200 hp
Initial version of the V12 Mohawk built with 80mm (3.15in) bore, developing 200 hp (149 kW). The Admiralty required more powerful engines than the Crusader, so Coatalen designed the Sunbeam 225 hp (168 kW) as a 60 degree V12 using blocks of three cylinders instead of the twin-cylinder blocks of the Crusader.
225 hp
Production versions built with 90mm (3.5in) bore, rated at 225 hp (168 kW). Short seaplanes using this engine were often called "225s". During 1917 this engine was re-named as the Sunbeam Mohawk.
Crusader
The name Crusader was applied to the engine in 1917 after production had ceased, and officially referred only to the later '150hp' version.
Zulu
Outwardly identical to the Crusader, the Zulu was developed during 1915, the bore was increased from 90 mm to 100 mm and the reduction gear ratio was changed to 1.86:1, allowing the engine to develop 160 hp (119 kW) at 2000 rpm. 75 Zulus were built.
Mohawk
The Mohawk was the Sunbeam 225hp re-named.
Gurkha
The Gurkha was developed as a replacement for the Mohawk with a bore of 100 mm (3.94in) and the gear ratio was reduced to 1.86:1, giving 240 hp (179 kW) at 2000 rpm. Production ended in October 1916, after 74 units had been supplied to power the Short 184 seaplanes of the Royal Naval Air Service.

== Applications ==
Data from:- Sunbeam Aero-Engines

- Avro 510
- Avro 519
- Avro 523 Pike (Zulu)
- Avro 527
- Blackburn GP
- Coastal-class airship(Crusader and Zulu)
- Curtiss H-4
- Curtiss R-2
- Maurice Farman Longhorn (Sunbeam 110hp)
- Handley Page Type O - two ordered 28 December 1914, (1372 and 1373), but later cancelled.
- Radley-England waterplane No.2 (Sunbeam 110hp)
- Royal Aircraft Factory RE.5
- Short Type 184 (Gurkha)
- Short Type 827 (Crusader and Zulu)
- Sikorsky Ilya Mourometz
- Sopwith Type 806 Gunbus (110hp) & (150hp)
- Grigorovich MK-1 (third engine - replaced by a 140 hp (100 kW) Hispano-Suiza engine.

== Specifications (150hp / Crusader) ==
Data from Sunbeam Aero-Engines

=== General characteristics ===
- Type: V8, side-valve, water-cooled, piston engine
- Bore: 90mm (3.5in)
- Stroke: 150mm (5.9in)
- Displacement: 7.6l (464cu in)
- Length: 1,219mm (48in)
- Width: 838mm (33in)
- Height: 759.5mm (29.9in)
- Dry weight: 218kg (480lb) dry, 286kg (630lb) running
- Designer: Louis Coatalen

=== Components ===
- Valvetrain: Push-rod operated side-valve, two valves per cyl
- Fuel system: 2x Claudel-Hobson CZ 42mm carburettors
- Cooling system: water-cooled by radiator

=== Performance ===
- Power output: 150 hp (112 kW) at 2,000 rpm

== See also ==
Comparable engines

- Hispano-Suiza 8
- Peugeot 8Aa
- Wolseley Viper

Related lists

- List of aircraft engines

== Bibliography ==
- Brew, Alec. Sunbeam Aero-Engines. Airlife Publishing. Shrewsbury. ISBN 1-84037-023-8
