= Farman F.45 =

Prototype French military reconnaissance biplane of 1916

F.45

General information
- Type: Military reconnaissance aircraft
- National origin: France
- Manufacturer: Farman
- Number built: 1

History
- First flight: 1916
- Successors: Dorand AR

The Farman F.45 was a prototype military biplane built by Farman in France during World War I. Its performance proved disappointing and it was not ordered into production.

== Design ==
The F.45 was of mostly conventional layout for its day, but represented a design departure for Farman. It was a single-bay, unstaggered sesquiplane with seating for the pilot and observer in tandem, open cockpits. It was powered by a piston engine in the nose driving a tractor propeller, and was equipped with fixed, tailskid undercarriage. The tail was of conventional design.

An unusual feature of the design was that instead of being attached directly to one or both sets of wings, the fuselage was mounted on struts in the interplane gap.

A contemporary Autochrome photograph by Léon Gimpel exists in the archives of the Société française de photographie of a very different aircraft also identified as an "F.45" at the time. This aircraft also has a conventional, tractor configuration, but instead of being mounted in the interplane gap, its fuselage is mounted directly beneath the top wings, and the lower wings are carried below on struts; an inversion of the typical biplane layout. The tail is also substantially different from the aircraft that is the subject of this article. The F.45 described by aviation historians James J. Davilla and Arthur M. Soltan in their book French Aircraft of the First World War had a long, triangular tail fin. The F.45 in Gimpel's photo has an elliptical fin, braced to the front with a strut. This article follows Davilla and Soltan's identification of the F.45. They published two photographs of the aircraft in Gimpel's photo in a section of their book titled "Farman Unknowns".

== Development ==
Farman's success was built on a range of pusher designs, but by 1916 it was evident that pushers were vulnerable to attacks from behind, a fact that German fighter pilots had realised and were exploiting. The Service Technique de l'Aéronautique ("Aeronautical Technical Service") began work to develop a tractor-configuration replacement for the Farman F.40s then in service, a process that eventually resulted in the Dorand AR. Facing the imminent obsolescence of their product, Farman also started developing tractor-configuration prototypes, including the F.30, F.45, F.47, F.48, and F.49. All of these proved to have poor flying characteristics and performance and none reached production. Farman eventually produced the Dorand AR under license.

== Specifications ==
Data from Liron 1984, p.47

General characteristics

- Crew: 2
- Length: 8.62 m (28 ft 3 in)
- Wingspan: 15.47 m (50 ft 9 in)
- Height: 3.79 m (12 ft 5 in)
- Wing area: 49 m^{2} (530 sq ft)
- Empty weight: 760 kg (1,676 lb)
- Powerplant: 1 × Renault 8Gc liquid-cooled, eight-cylinder, V engine, 130 kW (170 hp)

Performance

- Maximum speed: 153 km/h (95 mph, 83 kn)

== Notes ==
=== Bibliography ===
- Davilla, James J.; Soltan, Arthur M. (1997). French Aircraft of the First World War. Stratford, CT: Flying Machine Press.
- Gimpel, Léon. "Billancourt, départ pour Buc du premier fuselage d'avion militaire type F.45" [Billancourt : The first fuselage of the F.45 military aeroplane departs for Buc]. Société française de photographie (in French). Paris: Société française de photographie.
- The Illustrated Encyclopedia of Aircraft. London: Aerospace Publishing.
- Liron, Jean (1984). Les Avions Farman [The Farman Aeroplanes] (in French). Paris: Éditions Larivière.
