= F80 =

F80 may refer to:

== Vehicles ==
Aircraft

- Farman F.80, a French biplane
- Lockheed F-80 Shooting Star, an American jet fighter
- UL-Jih F80 Fascination, a Czech ultralight

Automobiles

- BMW F80, a German high performance sedan
- Toyota Kijang (F80), a Japanese multi purpose vehicle
- Ferrari F80, limited production sports car built by Italian automotive manufacturer Ferrari

Ships

- HMS Duncan (F80), a Blackwood-class frigate of the Royal Navy
- HMS Grafton (F80) a Type 23 frigate of the Royal Navy
- HMS Torrid (1917), an R-class destroyer of the Royal Navy
- HMS Woolwich (F80), a destroyer tender of the Royal Navy

== Other uses ==
- Nikon F80, a SLR camera also known as the Nikon N80
