= RBVZ-6 =

WW1 era inline-6 aircraft engine

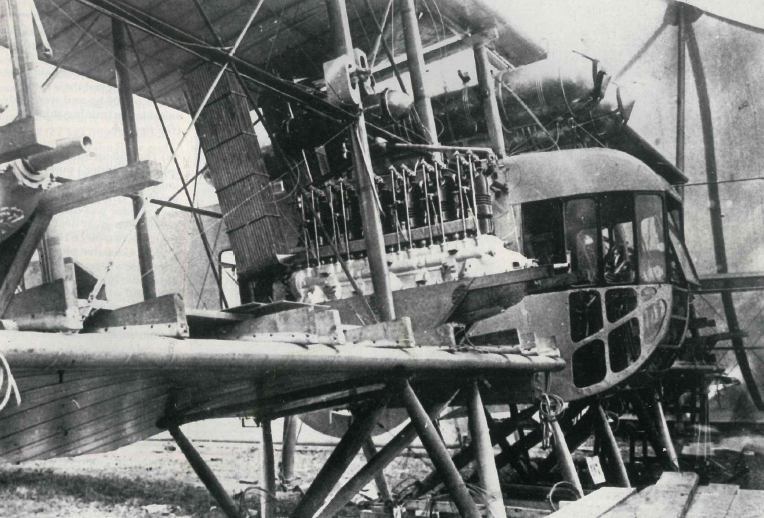
- RBVZ-6 engine fitted to Sikorsky Ilya Muromets No.167
- Type: Water-cooled inline-six aero engine
- National origin: Russian Empire
- Manufacturer: Russo-Baltic Wagon Factory (RBVZ)
- First run: 1915
- Major applications: Sikorsky Ilya Muromets
- Number built: 70
- Developed from: Benz Bz.III

The RBVZ-6 (Russian: РБВЗ-6) was a WW1-era inline-six aircraft engine first built by the Russo-Baltic Wagon Factory (RBVZ) at their workshop in Riga with production later moving to Petrograd and then to Moscow.

The engine was based on the Benz Bz.III with modifications to suit the materials and manufacturing techniques available in the Russian Empire. The changes resulted in the RBVZ-6 being heavier and less powerful than the German original.

RBVZ-6 engines powered several variants of the Sikorsky Ilya Muromets aircraft where they proved highly reliable. RBVZ-6 engines remained in service with the Ilya Muromets fleet until 1922 by which time the model had been redesignated as the M-1 under the Soviet's aircraft engine numbering system.

== Design and development ==
Before World War One, RBVZ was a large engineering company with factories in Riga and Petrograd. RBVZ's products included Russobalt cars and the Sikorsky Ilya Muromets aircraft. Engines for cars and trucks were made at RBVZ's factory in Riga.

In the autumn of 1914, RBVZ's director M.V. Shidlovsky announced a competition to create an engine for the Ilya Muromets aircraft. The new engine was to replace the German-built Argus 140 hp which was no longer available to RBVZ following the outbreak of hostilities between the German and Russian empires. Two groups from RBVZ took part in the competition. V.V. Kireev led the first group, located in Riga. A second group, located in Petrograd, reported to Igor Sikorsky.

The engine designed by Sikorsky's team in Petrograd closely followed the design of the Argus 140 hp and was designated as the MRB-6. The engine designed in Riga by Kireev's team was based on the Benz Bz.III and was designated as the RBVZ-6. Neither the RBVZ-6 nor the MRB-6 were exact copies of the German originals as both were adapted to use materials and components available in the Russian Empire. The RBVZ-6 was recognised as being superior to the MRB-6 in both power output and reliability. 300 RBVZ-6 engines were ordered to equip the Ilya Muromets fleet.

Kireev was a graduate of a German polytechnic and, before joining RBVZ, had gained practical experience with the Maybach and Daimler companies. (Note: After World War I, Kireev continued to design aircraft engines for the new Soviet authorities; however, none were ordered into production. Beginning in 1923, he worked on an advanced supercharged V12 engine, but cost overruns and delays led to his imprisonment as a “saboteur” in 1930. Nothing further is known about Kireev’s life after this date.) Kireev's team in Riga had access to a Benz Bz.III engine; however it is unknown if this was an example captured from a downed German aircraft or was purchased before the war. The RBVZ-6 was outwardly similar to the Benz Bz.III with tubes and pipes in the same positions however it was heavier and had a lower maximum power output than the German original.

As with the Benz Bz.III, the RBVZ-6 was a water-cooled inline-six engine. Cylinders were made of cast iron with individual welded sheet steel cooling-water jackets. Pistons were also made of cast iron. A single camshaft, located on the left-hand side of the engine block, drove one inlet and one exhaust valve in each cylinder head. Each valve was connected to the camshaft using long individual push rods (12 in total). The ignition system had 100% redundancy with two spark plugs per cylinder and two magnetos. Inlet manifolds and exhausts were located on the right-hand side of the engine. Each cylinder had an individual exhaust pipe. The crankcase was fitted with breathers. Two carburettors fitted on the right-hand side of the engine drew in air from the crankcase. This design cooled and scavenged the crankcase while heating the inlet air to the carburettor which helped to vaporise the fuel.

The engine design was relatively simple to manufacture, and both the Benz Bz.III and the RBVZ-6 were regarded as highly reliable for their time period. However, by the time the RBVZ-6 entered serial production, its design was outdated, and it had a relatively low power-to-weight ratio.

== Production ==
Preparation for serial production of the RBVZ-6 began in Riga; however, only five engines were completed before the advance of the German army into the western regions of the Russian Empire forced the production line to evacuate to Petrograd during the autumn of 1915.

While waiting for RBVZ-6 production to be reestablished, RBVZ put the MRB-6 into production. An order for 40 MRB-6 engines was placed to equip the Ilya Muromets bomber fleet however only 16 were delivered. The MRB-6 was found to have less power than the RBVZ-6 and suffered from poor reliability. No MRB-6 engines were fitted to operational Ilya Muromets aircraft.

In 1916, a pilot batch of five RBVZ-6 engines was manufactured at a converted warehouse in Petrograd which had previously been used to store wine. A total of 45 RBVZ-6 engines were eventually manufactured in Petrograd with production ending in March 1918. A further 20 engines were later assembled from existing parts at a new purpose-built facility near Moscow.

In 1921 the RBVZ-6 was re-designated as the M-1 under a new Soviet numbering system which included the M-2 (Le Rhone 9J) and the M-3 (Renault 12F).

== Operational history ==
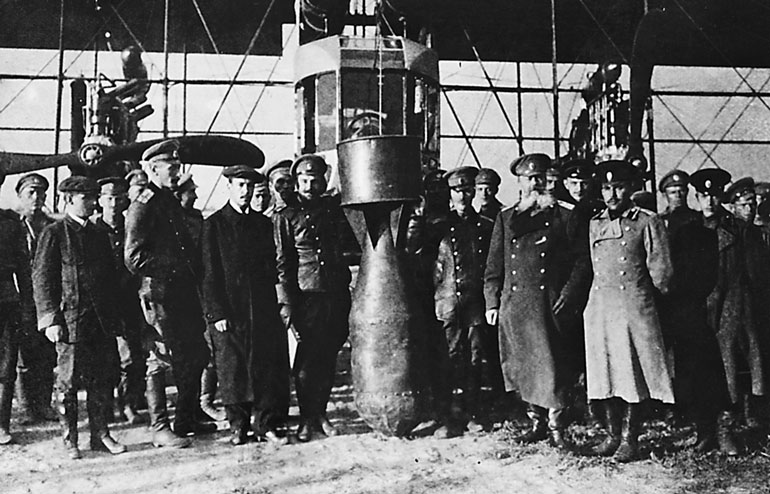
Ilya Muromets with RBVZ-6 engines. Igor Sikorsky, fourth from the left. M. V. Shidlovsky, third from the right.

In the spring of 1915, the first of the Ilya Muromets to be powered by RBVZ-6 engines (aircraft number 167) did a test drop of a 410 kg (904 lb) bomb. This set a new world record for the heaviest bomb dropped from an aircraft.

Ilya Muromets aircraft fitted with the RBVZ-6 engines were noted for having superior performance to airframes fitted with Salmson water-cooled radial aero-engines. The Salmson engines were initially used as a replacement for German-built Argus engines however the large frontal area of the un-cowled radial increased the drag compared to the sleek inline-six designs of the Argus and the RBVZ-6 resulting in a noticeable deterioration in aircraft performance.

In service, the RBVZ-6 was a reliable engine and by mid-1916 it was being used as a substitute for imported Sunbeam Crusaders on new Ilya Muromets aircraft. RBVZ-6 engines remained in service into the 1920s. Four RBVZ-6 engines powered the last airworthy Ilya Muromets which crashed into a cabbage field in July 1922.

== Applications ==
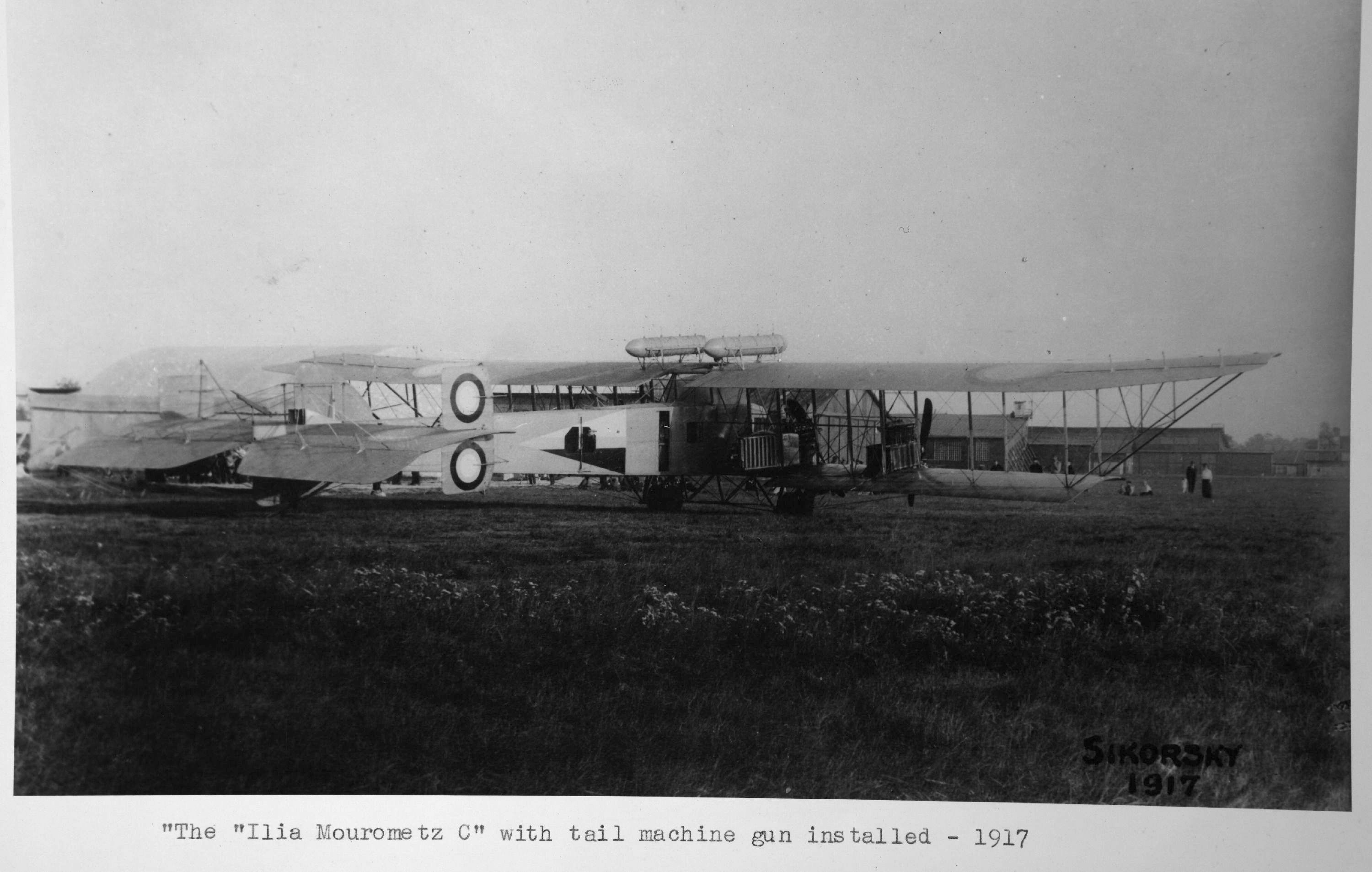
Ilya Muromets "Renobalt" with Renault 12F engines in the inboard positions and RBVZ-6 engines outboard

- Sikorsky Ilya Muromets
  - S-23 V(eh) – One aircraft (No 167) fitted with four RBVZ-6 engines
  - S-25 G-2 "Russobalt" series fitted with four RBVZ-6 engines
  - S-25 G-3 "Renobalt" series fitted with two Renault 12F engines in the inboard positions and two RBVZ-6 engines in the outboard positions

== Specifications ==
Data from Kotelnikov, 2010

=== General characteristics ===
- Type: Upright six-cylinder four-stroke inline piston engine
- Bore: 130 mm (5.118 in)
- Stroke: 180 mm (7.087 in)
- Displacement: 14.3 L (873 cu in)
- Dry weight: 292 kg (644 lb)

=== Components ===
- Valvetrain: One camshaft in the engine block, driving one inlet and one exhaust valve per cylinder via pushrods and rocker arms (overhead valve).
- Fuel system: Two carburettors mounted on the right side of the crankcase
- Oil system: Wet sump
- Cooling system: Water-cooled
- Reduction gear: None. Direct Drive.
- Rotation: Counterclockwise when looking end on at the propeller hub

=== Performance ===
- Power output: 112 kW (150 hp) at 1,400 rpm
- Specific power: 8.4 kW/L (11 hp/L)
- Compression ratio: 4.5:1
- Fuel consumption: 32.25 kg/h (71.10 lb/h)
- Power-to-weight ratio: 0.38 kW/kg (0.23 hp/lb)

== See also ==
Comparable engines

- Austro-Daimler 6
- Beardmore 160 hp
- Mercedes D.III
- SPA 6A

Related lists

- List of aircraft engines
