= DH.2 =

DH.2 or DH-2 or DH 2 may refer to:

- Airco DH.2, a British 1910s biplane fighter
- Häfeli DH-2, a Swiss 1910s reconnaissance biplane
- Die Hard 2, 1990 film starring Bruce Willis
- Harry Potter and the Deathly Hallows – Part 2, a 2011 film
- DH2, imprint label of Dirty Hit
