= Häfeli DH-2 =

DH-2
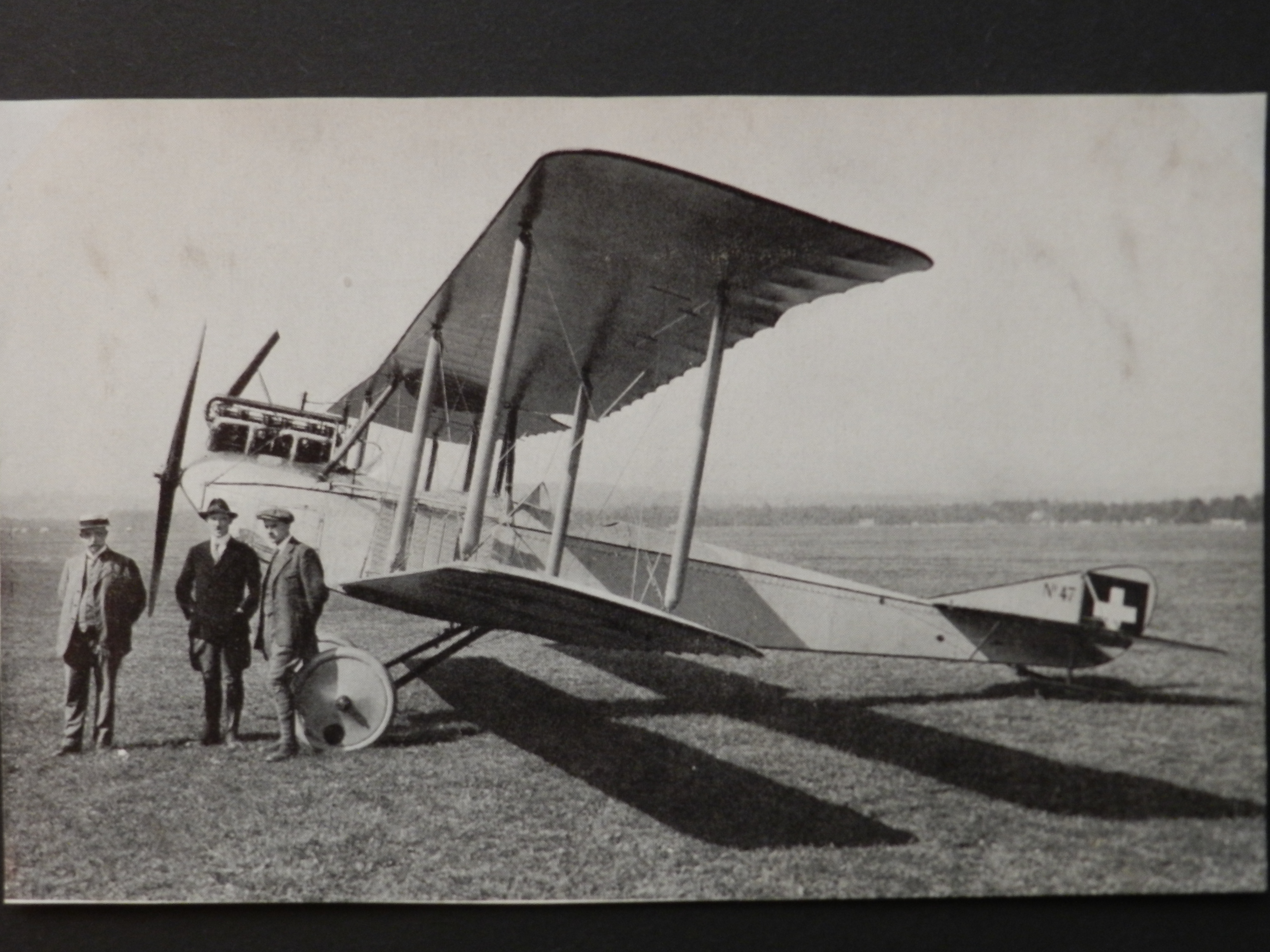

General information
- Type: Reconnaissance biplane
- Manufacturer: K + W
- Designer: August Häfeli
- Primary user: Swiss Air Force
- Number built: 6

History
- Introduction date: 1916
- First flight: 1916
- Retired: 1922

The Häfeli DH-2 was a 1910s Swiss two-seat reconnaissance aircraft, built by aircraft department of the Eidgenoessische Konstruktionswerkstaette (K + W) at Thun, Switzerland.

== Development and design ==
Following on from his earlier design (the DH-1), August Haefeli designed a more conventional biplane for reconnaissance duties designated the Häfeli DH-2. It was a two-bay of wood and fabric construction, powered by a 100 hp (75 kW) Mercedes D.I engine, the next five were fitted with an Argus As II water-cooled inline engine. The engine required a large flat radiator which was mounted beside the front cockpit. Performance was disappointing and the aircraft did not go into production. An improved version, the Hafeli DH-3 was developed.

== Operational history ==
The six DH-2s built during 1916 were used to train pilots and observers until they were withdrawn from service in 1922.

== Operators ==
Switzerland

- Swiss Air Force

== Specifications (DH-2) ==
Data from The Illustrated Encyclopedia of Aircraft (Part Work 1982–1985)

General characteristics

- Crew: 2
- Powerplant: 1 × Argus As II , 89 kW (120 hp)

Performance
