= Sikorsky Ilya Muromets =

Russian airplane series

Ilya Muromets
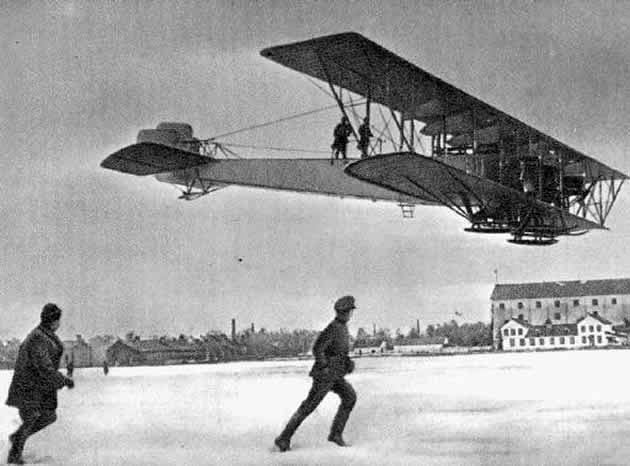

General information
- Type: Airliner, heavy bomber
- National origin: Russian Empire
- Manufacturer: Russo-Baltic Wagon Factory
- Designer: Igor Sikorsky
- Primary user: Imperial Russian Air Service
- Number built: 85+

History
- Manufactured: 1913 to 1917
- Introduction date: 1914
- First flight: 1913
- Retired: 1922
- Developed from: Sikorsky Russky Vityaz

The Sikorsky Ilya Muromets (Russian: Сикорский Илья Муромец; versions S-22, S-23, S-24, S-25, S-26 and S-27) was a class of Russian pre-World War I large four-engine commercial airliners and military heavy bombers used during World War I by the Russian Empire. The aircraft series was named after Ilya Muromets, a hero in Russian folklore. The series was based on the Russky Vityaz or Le Grand, the world's first four-engined aircraft, designed by Igor Sikorsky. The Ilya Muromets aircraft as it appeared in 1913 was a revolutionary design, intended for commercial service with its spacious fuselage incorporating a passenger saloon and washroom on board. The Ilya Muromets was the world's first multi-engine aircraft in production and at least sixty were built. During World War I, it became the first four-engine bomber to equip a dedicated strategic bombing unit. This heavy bomber was unrivaled in the early stages of the war, as the Central Powers had no aircraft capable enough to rival it until much later.

== Design and development ==
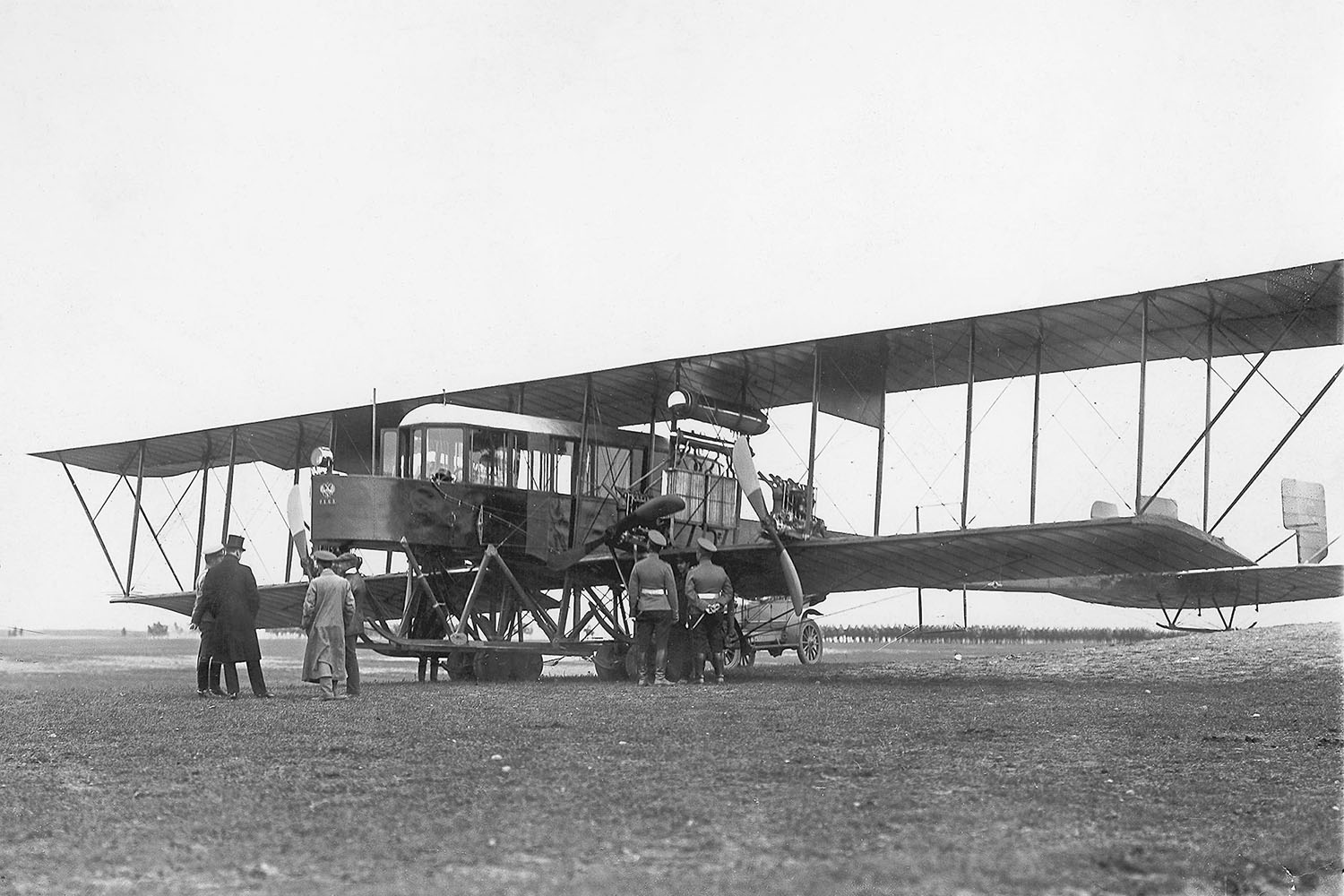
Russky Vityaz

The Ilya Muromets (Sikorsky S-22) was designed and constructed by Igor Sikorsky at the Russo-Baltic Carriage Factory (RBVZ) in Saint Petersburg in 1913. It was based on his earlier S-21 Russky Vityaz, which started out as the twin-engined Le Grand, then as the twin tandem-engined Bolshoi Baltisky before placing all four of the Baltisky's engines in a tractor configuration along the lower wing's leading edge to create the Russky Vityaz — which had played an important role in the development of Russian aviation and the multi-engine aircraft industries of the world.

The Ilya Muromets was first conceived and built as a luxurious aircraft. It was the first aircraft to have an insulated passenger saloon, containing wicker chairs, a bedroom, a lounge, as well as the first airborne toilet. The aircraft also had heating and electrical lighting. The S-22 cockpit had sufficient space allowing several persons to observe the pilot. Openings on both sides of the fuselage permitted mechanics to climb out onto the lower wings to service the engines during flight. A hatch on the left side provided an entry to the main cabin, behind the cockpit. The main cabin featured two large windows on each side. Further back was a private cabin that included a berth, a small table, and a cabinet. Lighting was provided by a wind-driven generator and heating was supplied by two long engine exhaust pipes that passed through the corners of the cabin. Despite many advancements, the flight instruments on the Ilya Muromets were primitive. They included four tachometers, one per engine, a compass, a crude altimeter and airspeed indicator, two glass U-shaped tubes and a ball for bank indication, and a series of horizontal bars situated vertically on the nose of the fuselage for measuring climbs and descents. Later, in the bomber variants, a drift indicator and elementary bombsight were added to aid bombing.

In 1913 the Ilya Muromets No. 107 flew for the first time, and on 11 February 1914, the second prototype (factory airframe 128) took off for its first demonstration flight with 16 passengers aboard, marking a record for number of passengers carried. From 30 June to 12 July 1914, it set a world record by making a trip from Saint Petersburg to Kiev, a distance of some 1200 km, and back. The first leg took 14 hours and 38 minutes, with one landing for fuel at Orsha, and the return one, with a fuel stop at Novosokolniki, took even less time, about 13 hours. According to Sikorsky, "The 2,600 kilometres (1,600 mi) flight proved conclusively the value of large multi-motored airplanes. The Army placed an order for ten four-engined airplanes of the Ilia Mourometz type and the factory personnel was overjoyed by this final approval of the results of two years of hard work." The acclaim received by Sikorsky included Tsar Nicholas II presenting him with the Order of St. Vladimir, Fourth Degree, arranging for an exemption from the wartime draft to allow him to continue his design work, and a promise of a grant worth 100,000 rubles from the State Duma. (Note: One of Sikorsky's prized possessions was a personal gift from the Tsar, a diamond-studded gold watch that arrived later in the mail, also in recognition of his achievements with the Ilya Muromets. Sikorski retained the watch throughout his lifetime.) During an Imperial military review at Krasnoye Selo in July, Nicholas II decorated and christened the Ilya Muromets Type B Military Prototype, No. 128, the "Kievsky."

During testing, the Ilya Muromets were fitted with both skis and pontoons in anticipation of new variants being produced. If it had not been for World War I, the Ilya Muromets would probably have started passenger flights that same year.

With the beginning of World War I, Sikorsky was encouraged by the results of the proving flights to redesign the aircraft to become the "Military Ilia Mourometz, Type V", the world's first purpose-designed heavier than air bomber. (Note: Sikorsky used the French transliteration of "Ilya Muromets.") The new heavy bomber was slightly smaller and lighter than the Type A. Internal racks carried up to 800 kg of bombs, and positions for up to nine machine guns were added for self-defense in various locations, including the extreme tail. The Muromets (in its S-25 Geh-2 variant, March 1916) was the first aircraft in history to incorporate a tail gunner position. The engines were protected with 5 mm-thick armor. The military version was designed expressly for long-range flying in both bombing and reconnaissance roles.

== Operational history ==
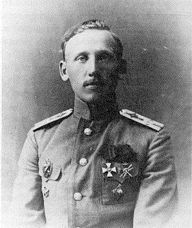
Yosip Stanislavovich Bashko, pilot of "Ilya Muromets" based in Kiev

When WWI broke out, only two Ilya Muromets bombers were completed out of an initial production run of ten aircraft. In August 1914, the Ilya Muromets was introduced to the Imperial Russian Air Service and on 10 December 1914, the Russians formed their first ten-bomber squadron, slowly increasing the number to 20 by mid-1916. Operations with the heavy bombers began on 12 February 1915 with a raid on German frontline positions.

German Fighter Pilots often were reluctant to attack Ilya Muromets in the air due to their defensive firepower including the unique tail gun position, and the difficulty in bringing down such a large aircraft. Once engaged, small fighters also found that they were buffeted by propeller wash of the four large engines.

On 12 September 1916 (Julian calendar), the Russians lost their first Ilya Muromets in a fight with four German Albatros, three of which it managed to shoot down. This was also the only loss to enemy action during the war; three others were damaged in combat, but managed to return to base to be repaired.

83 Ilya Muromets bombers were built for the Russian forces between 1913 and 1918. They recorded a number of firsts in the history of military aviation, like bombing from heavy bombers, performing bomber group raids on enemy targets, night bombing, and photographic bomb damage assessment. They were also the first to develop defensive tactics for a single bomber engaged in an air combat with several enemy fighters.

The Ilya Muromets performed more than 400 sorties and dropped 65 tons of bombs during the war. By 1917, attrition from constant flying had reduced the bombing fleet substantially and only four bombers remained at the front line; the other Ilya Muromets were relegated to trainer duties. The heavy bombers of other participants appeared in 1916, all resembling the Russian pioneer to a certain degree. The Russian government and Sikorsky himself sold the design and production license to the British and French governments. The Germans tried to copy its design, using the fragments of the Ilya Muromets they had shot down over their territory in September 1916. By the end of 1916, the design was generally believed to be at the end of its development cycle, with ensuing modifications to individual aircraft, such as additional armor and weapons, making the aircraft too heavy and not suitable for operational use. Continual changes in the field as well as the factory led to many aircraft being redesignated as a new variant.

=== Russian Revolution and aftermath ===
After the armistice between Russia and the Central Powers about 30 Ilya Muromets were captured and destroyed. One Ilya Muromets S-26 D-1 was taken by Polish forces in the city of Babruysk. In October of 1917, Ukrainian forces acquired 16 Ilya Muromets aircraft near the city of Vinnytsia however only six of these were serviceable. During summer of 1918 the Ukrainian State counted four Ilya Murmomets aircraft in its inventory. A few remaining aircraft were used by the newly formed Soviet Air Forces during the Russian Civil War as trainers and transports. Some sources claim that Ilya Muromets aircraft were also used by the White Army during the conflict.

From 1921 Ilya Muromets were used as civil airliners on routes from Moscow to Sevastopol (via Kharkiv) and from Sarapul to Yekaterinburg. The last airworthy Ilya Muromets was a G-series aircraft, powered by four domestically built RBVZ-6 engines, which crash-landed into a cabbage field in July 1922.

== Variants ==
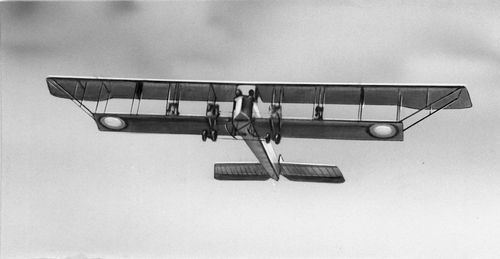
Ilya Muromets S-23

Ilya Muromets No. 107
Experimental airliner, 1913; fitted with four 100 hp (75 kW) Argus As I engines, later refitted with two 200 hp (150 kW) Salmson 2M7 and two Argus 115 hp engines.
Ilya Muromets No. 107 Hydroplane
Hydroplane modification of airframe No. 107, fitted with two 200 hp (150 kW) Salmson 2M7 and two Argus 115 hp engines.
Ilya Muromets Kievsky No. 128
Experimental airliner, 1914; fitted with two Argus 140 hp engines and two Argus 125 hp engines.
Ilya Muromets S-22 Type A
Unarmed trainer, one built 1913, used in Gachina Air School in 1914
Ilya Muromets S-23 Type B(eh) Bomber
Bomber. First flight: 1914, in service August 1914, original armament: one 37mm cannon, one 8 mm machine gun; six built (heavily modified).

Type B No 135, 1914; fitted with four Argus engines of 130 hp each.
Type B No 136, 1914; fitted with two Salmson engines of 200 hp each and two Salmson engines of 136 hp each.
Type B No 137, 1914; fitted with two Salmson engines of 200 hp each and two Salmson engines of 136 hp each.
Type B No 138, 1914; fitted with two Salmson engines of 200 hp each and two Salmson engines of 136 hp each.
Type B No 139, 1914; fitted with two Salmson engines of 200 hp each and two Salmson engines of 136 hp each.

Ilya Muromets S-23 V(eh) Series
Bomber, First flight 1914, fitted with four Sunbeam Crusader V-8 engines of 148 hp each

Type V No 151, 1915; fitted with four Argus engines of 140 hp each.
Type V No 159 Trainer aircraft, 1915; fitted with two Sunbeam 225 hp V-8 engines.
Type V No 167, 1915; fitted with four RBVZ-6 engines of 150 hp each.
Type V No 182; fitted with four Beardmore 160 hp engines. Aircraft later rebuilt as a G-1.

Ilya Muromets S-24 G-1 Series
Bomber, First flight 1914; 18 built.
Ilya Muromets S-25 Series
Bomber, First flight 1915; 55 built.
Ilya Muromets S-25 G-2 "Russobalt"
Bomber, fitted with four RBVZ-6 engines of 150 hp, 170 kg bombload, five MG.
Ilya Muromets S-25 G-3 "Renobalt" Series
Bomber, fitted with two Renault engines of 220 hp each and two RBVZ-6 engines of 150 hp, 190 kg bombload, six MG
Ilya Muromets S-26 D-1 DIM Series
Bomber, First flight 1916, fitted with four Sunbeam engines of 150 hp; three built.
Ilya Muromets S-27 E (Yeh-2) Series
Bomber, First flight 1916, fitted with four Renault engines of 220 hp each; two built.

== Operators ==
=== Military ===
Russian Empire/Russian Republic

- Imperial Russian Air Service

Russian SFSR

- Soviet Air Forces

Poland

- Polish Air Force

=== Civilian ===
- Soviet Union Civil Air Fleet

== Replica ==
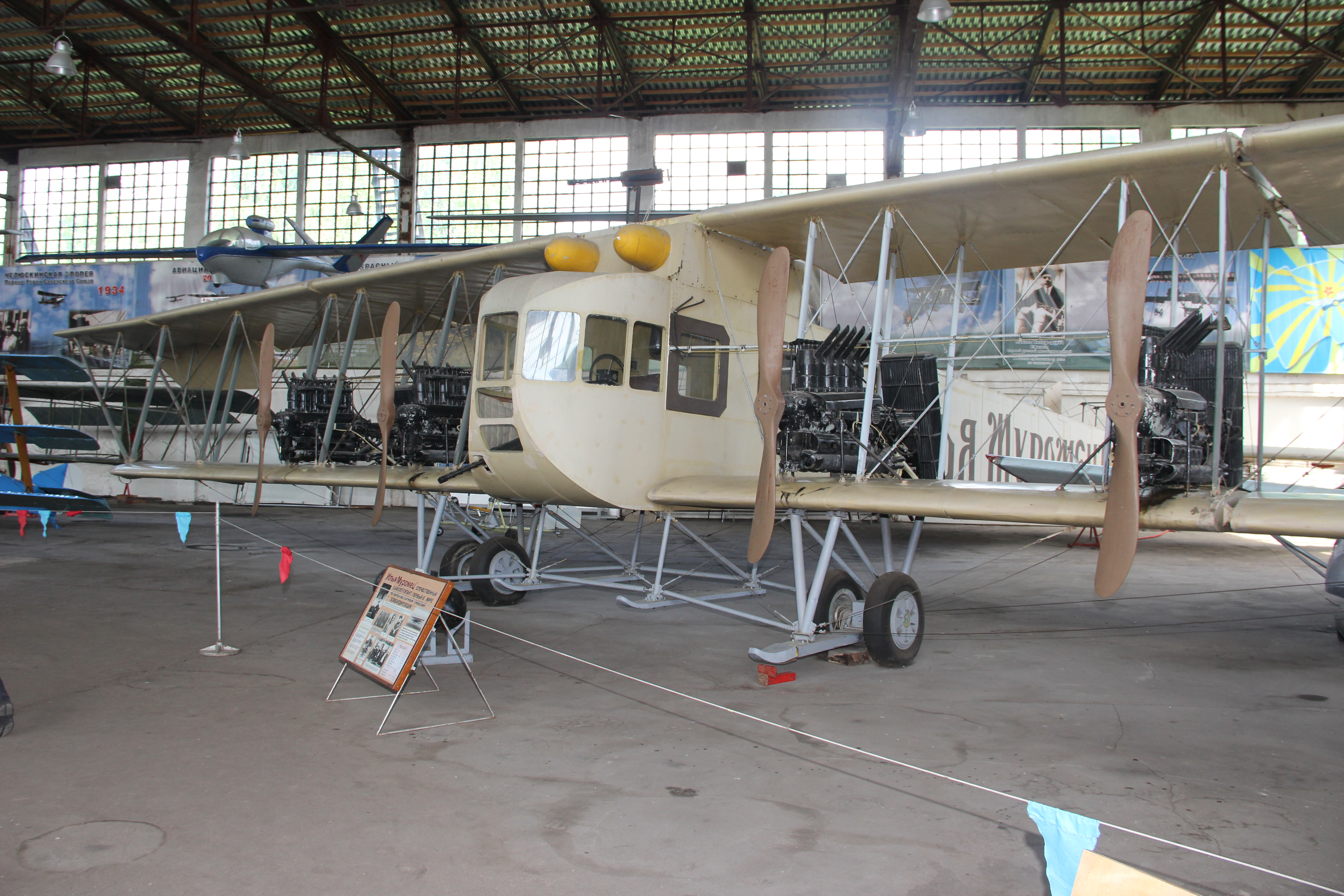
Full-scale replica of Sikorsky S-22 Ilya Muromets in Monino Air Force Museum.

One Ilya Muromets S-22 replica exists in the Monino Air Force Museum near Moscow built in 1970.

== Specifications (Ilya Muromets Type S-27 E-2) ==
Data from

General characteristics

- Crew: 8
- Length: 18.8 m (61 ft 8 in)
- Upper wingspan: 34.5 m (113 ft 2 in)
- Lower wingspan: 26.6 m (87 ft 3 in)
- Wing area: 220 m^{2} (2,400 sq ft)
- Empty weight: 5,000 kg (11,023 lb)
- Gross weight: 7,460 kg (16,446 lb)
- Fuel capacity: 920 kg (2,028 lb)
- Powerplant: 4 × Renault 12F V-12 water-cooled piston engines 220 hp (160 kW)
- Propellers: 2-bladed fixed-pitch propellers

Performance

- Maximum speed: 130 km/h (81 mph, 70 kn)
- Range: 560 km (350 mi, 300 nmi)
- Endurance: 4.4 hours
- Service ceiling: 3,200 m (10,500 ft)
- Time to altitude: .
  - 9 min 24 s to 1,000 m (3,300 ft)
  - 26 min to 2,000 m (6,600 ft)
  - 68 min to 3,000 m (9,800 ft)
- Wing loading: 34.2 kg/m^{2} (7.0 lb/sq ft)
- Power/mass: 0.087 kW/kg (0.053 hp/lb)

Armament

- Guns: 8 machine guns
- Bombs: Up to 800 kg (1,764 lb) with individual bomb-sizes up to 410 kg (904 lb)

== See also ==
- List of Russian inventions

Related development

- Sikorsky Russky Vityaz

Aircraft of comparable role, configuration, and era

- Wanamaker Triplane
- Zeppelin-Staaken R.VI
- Zeppelin-Staaken R.XIV
- AEG R.I
- Handley Page V/1500
