= Renault 12F =

French V12 aircraft engine series in use during WW1 and the 1920s

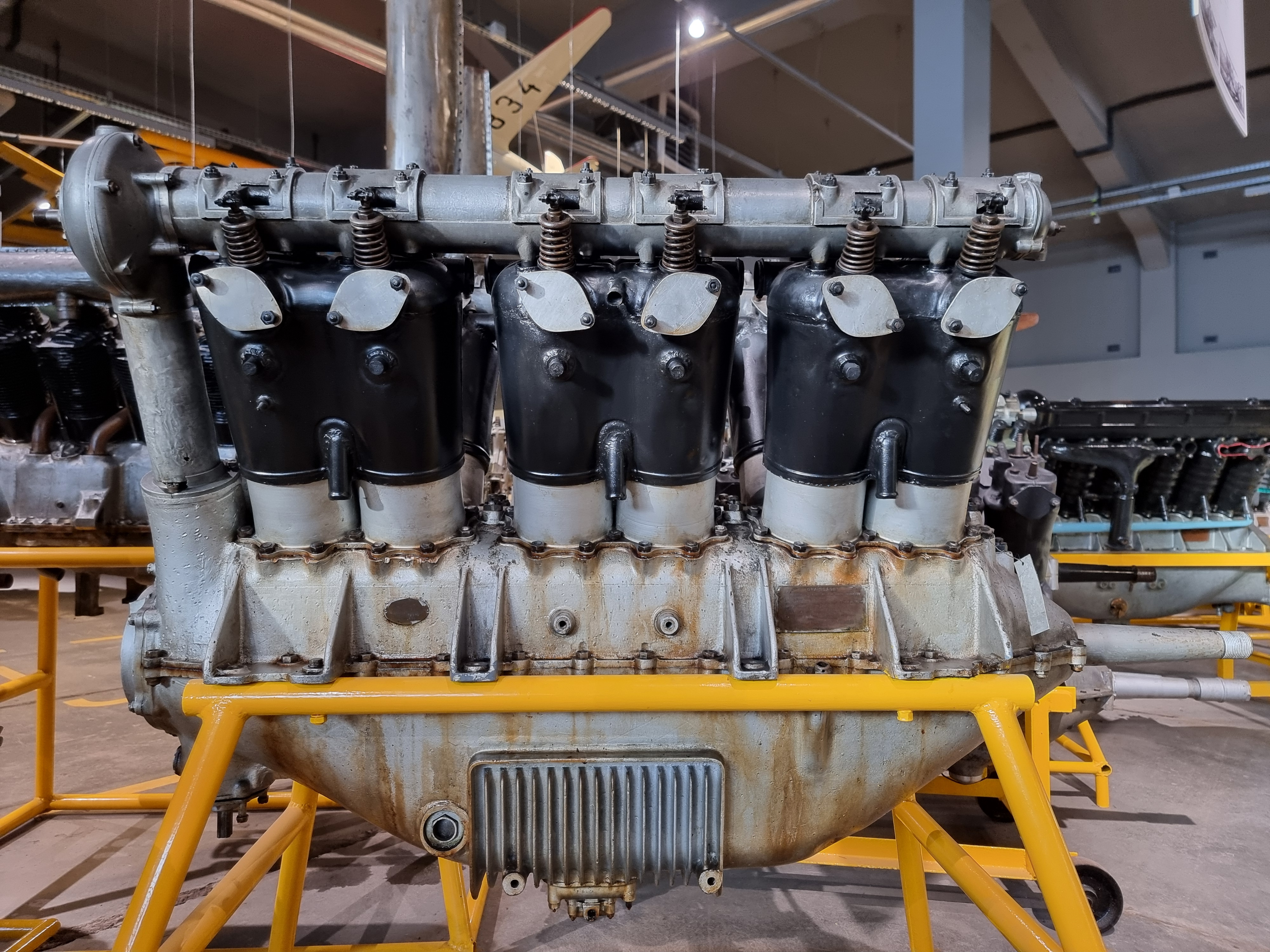
- Renault 12Fe engine on display at the Polish Aviation Museum in Kraków
- Type: Water-cooled V12 aero engine
- National origin: France
- Manufacturer: Renault
- First run: Late 1915
- Major applications: Breguet 14
- Number built: 12Fe: >7,000; Others: ~700
- Developed from: Renault 8G
- Variants: Renault 12Fe (300 CV)

The Renault 12F is a family of liquid-cooled 22 L (1,300 cu in) 50 deg V12 aircraft engines that saw widespread use during World War I and the 1920s.

The 12F series was developed from Renault's 8G engines with the two series sharing the same cylinder bore and stoke. 12F series engines were built in Renault's factories in France, Russia and the United Kingdom.

Renault designated early engines in the series by their nominal output of 220 hp (160 kW). The engines were progressively improved with the introduction of aluminum pistons allowing for increased power and reduced weight. These progressive improvements eventually lead to the development of a 300 hp (220 kW) variant which was designated as the 12Fe by the Service Technique de l'Aéronautique (STAe) while being known, and marketed, as the 300 CV (cheval-vapeur) (French: "horsepower”) by Renault.

== Design and development ==
In 1914, Renault began building their first water cooled V8 aircraft engines which became known as the 8G series. In 1915, Renault's engineers added two more cylinders to produce a V12 engine with the same bore, stroke and bank angle as the 8Gs. The series became known as the 12F. (Note: Renault exhibited the world’s first V12 aircraft engine at the 1911 the Paris airshow. However, this was air-cooled design with a 60-degree bank angle.)

Engines in the series are V12s with a 50 degree angle between two rows of cylinders each of which has a single overhead camshaft. The crankshaft is carried on four plain bearings with master-and-slave connecting rods allowing corresponding cylinders in each row to be arranged directly opposite each other. Cylinders have a bore of 125 mm (4.92 in), a stroke of 150 mm (5.91 in) and are cast individually. Cylinders are arranged in pairs with one welded liner circulating cooling water around each cylinder pair.

All engines in the series have ignition systems with 100% redundancy. Two spark plugs per cylinder and four magnetos (two per cylinder bank).

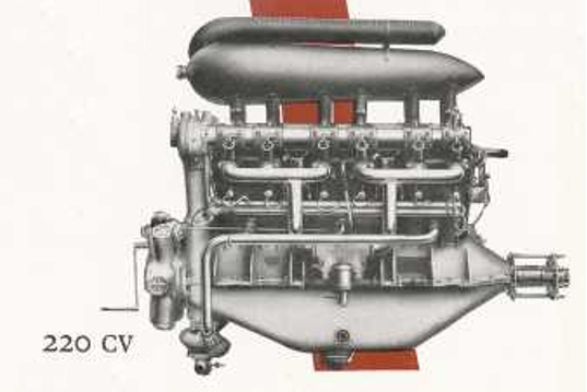
Brochure image of an early 12F variant with radial starter motor

The early 12F engines were often supplied with an aluminium six-cylinder radial pneumatic starter motor which was mounted on the back of the engine. The pneumatic motor allowed the engine to be restarted mid-flight or on the ground without assistance from ground crew. The starter motor was fed from a pressurised vessel with enough air for ten starts. The device was not included in later models.

In late 1915 the 220 hp (12Fa) model used cast iron pistons. The engines were progressively improved with the introduction of aluminum pistons allowing for increased power output and reduced weight.

In 1917, the 12Fe model was homologated with a nominal rating of 300 hp (224 kW) (later increased to 320 hp (239 kW)). The 12Fe became the standard powerplant for the Breguet 14 and accounted for the vast majority of engines built from the series.

12F series engines were exported to the United States and produced in the United Kingdom.

In Russia, Renault 12F engines were assembled from imported parts by the Russian Renault Society in Petrograd. A total of 98 engines were assembled from July 1916 to September 1917. All the engines assembled were early 12F models with cast iron pistons. In 1921 the 12F was re-designated as the M-3 under a new Soviet numbering system which included the M-1 (RBVZ-6) and the M-2 (Le Rhone 9J).

== Variants ==
Publications often refer to the 12Fe as the Renault 300 hp with earlier engines in the series referred to as the Renault 220 hp. Post WW1 the 12Fe engine was marketed as the 300 CV (cheval-vapeur) (French: "horsepower”).

12Fa
(1915) Rating of 220 hp (164 kW) at 1300 rpm. Used on the Breguet 14s and Henry Farman HF.35 prototypes. The HF.35 made its first flight in December 1915.

12Fb
(1916) Rating of 250 or 265 hp. Equipped the Paul Schmitt P.S.7 and the Breguet 5.

12Fc
Used on early model Bréguet 14s. 12Fcx (250 hp (186 kW) at 1500 rpm) and 12Fcy (280 hp (209 kW) at 1600 rpm) sub-variants. In US service 12Fc engines were all rated at 300 hp (224 kW).

12Fe

Rated for 300 hp (224 kW) at 1600 rpm. Main production variant in the series and the standard power-plant in the Breguet 14 from late 1917 onwards. The names 12Fe and 300 CV / hp (cheval-vapeur / horsepower) are used interchangeably in post war technical documentation. Some of these engines were fitted with early experimental Rateau turbochargers.

12Ff
Sometimes used to describe a small number of engines produced with increased bore (128 mm) and stroke (160 mm). Rated for 350 hp (261 kW) at 1,600 rpm. These engines were fitted to a few late production Breguet 14s.

== Applications ==
=== 12Fa, 12Fb and 12Fc ===
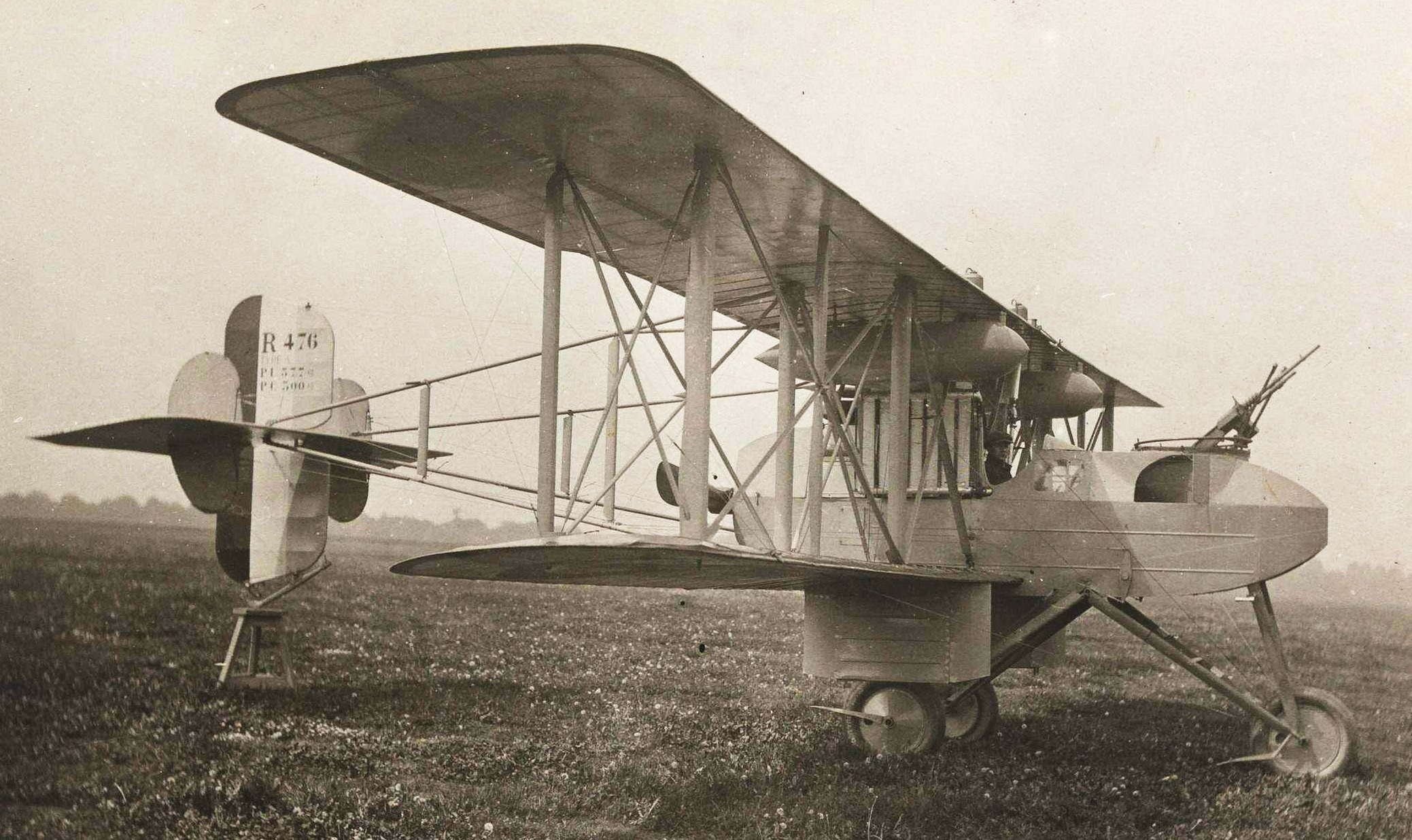
Breguet 5 powered by a single Renault 12Fb engine (1916)

- Breguet 5
- Breguet 14 (prototype and early models)
- Henry Farman HF.35
- Henry Farman HF.36
- Nieuport 15
- Paul Schmitt P.S.7
- Curtiss Wanamaker Triplane
- Grigorovich M-24
- Sikorsky Ilya Muromets

=== 12Fe (300 hp) ===
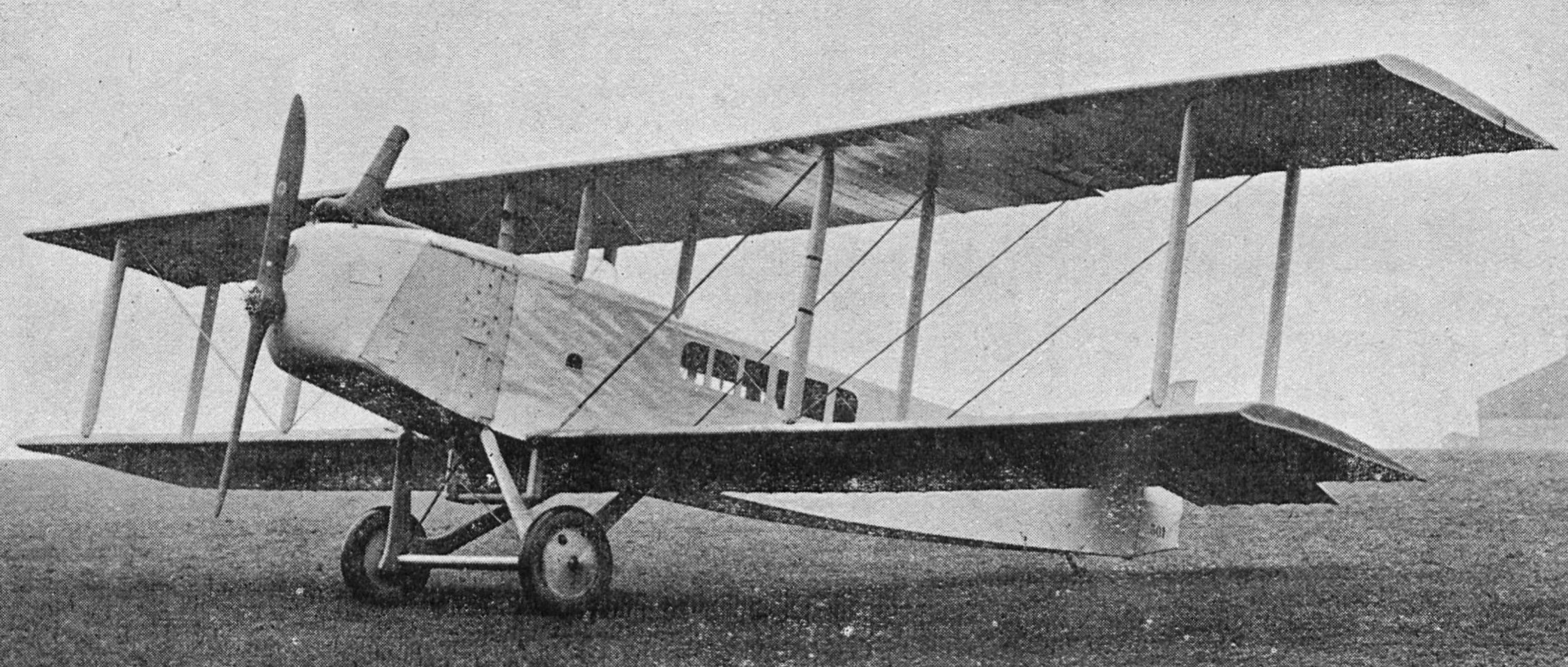
Farman F.70 airliner powered by a single Renault 12Fe engine (1922)

- Breguet 14 (from late 1917 onwards)
- Breguet 16
- Caudron C.91
- Farman F.60 Goliath
- Farman F.70
- Georges Levy G.L.40
- Hanriot HD.18
- Latécoère 14
- Latécoère 17
- Lioré et Olivier LeO 8
- Lioré et Olivier LeO H-13
- Paul Schmitt P.S.10
- Potez XV
- Voisin X
- Airco DH.4
- Royal Aircraft Factory R.E.7
- Short Type 184

=== 12Ff ===
- Breguet 14 (small number of late war examples)

== Specifications (12Fc) ==
Data from Angle,

=== General characteristics ===
- Type: Water–cooled, upright, 50-degree, V-12 piston engine
- Bore: 125 mm (4.92 in)
- Stroke: 150 mm (5.91 in)
- Displacement: 22.08 L (1,347 cu in)
- Dry weight: 379 kg (836 lb)

=== Components ===
- Valvetrain: SOHC (single overhead camshafts). Two valves per cylinder.
- Fuel system: Two Zenith duplex carburetors. Heated by water jacket.
- Fuel type: Gasoline
- Oil system: Wet sump. 2 Gear pumps. One pump circulates oil. The other pump transfers oil from tank to sump.
- Cooling system: Water-cooled. Two centrifugal pumps.
- Reduction gear: None. Direct drive.
- Rotation: Counterclockwise when looking end on at the propeller hub

=== Performance ===
- Power output: 285 hp (213 kW) @ 1550 rpm
- Compression ratio: 4.6:1
- Specific fuel consumption: 0.315 kg/kWh (0.518 lb/(hp⋅h))
- Oil consumption: 0.033 kg/kWh (0.055 lb/(hp⋅h))
- Power-to-weight ratio: 0.561 kW/kg (0.341 hp/lb)

== See also ==
Related development

- Renault 8G - A family of V8 engines sharing the same cylinder size and bank angle as the 12F

Comparable engines

- Liberty L-12
- Peugeot 8Aa
- Rolls-Royce Eagle
- Sunbeam Cossack

Related lists

- List of aircraft engines
