= Argus 115 hp =

1910s German piston aircraft engine

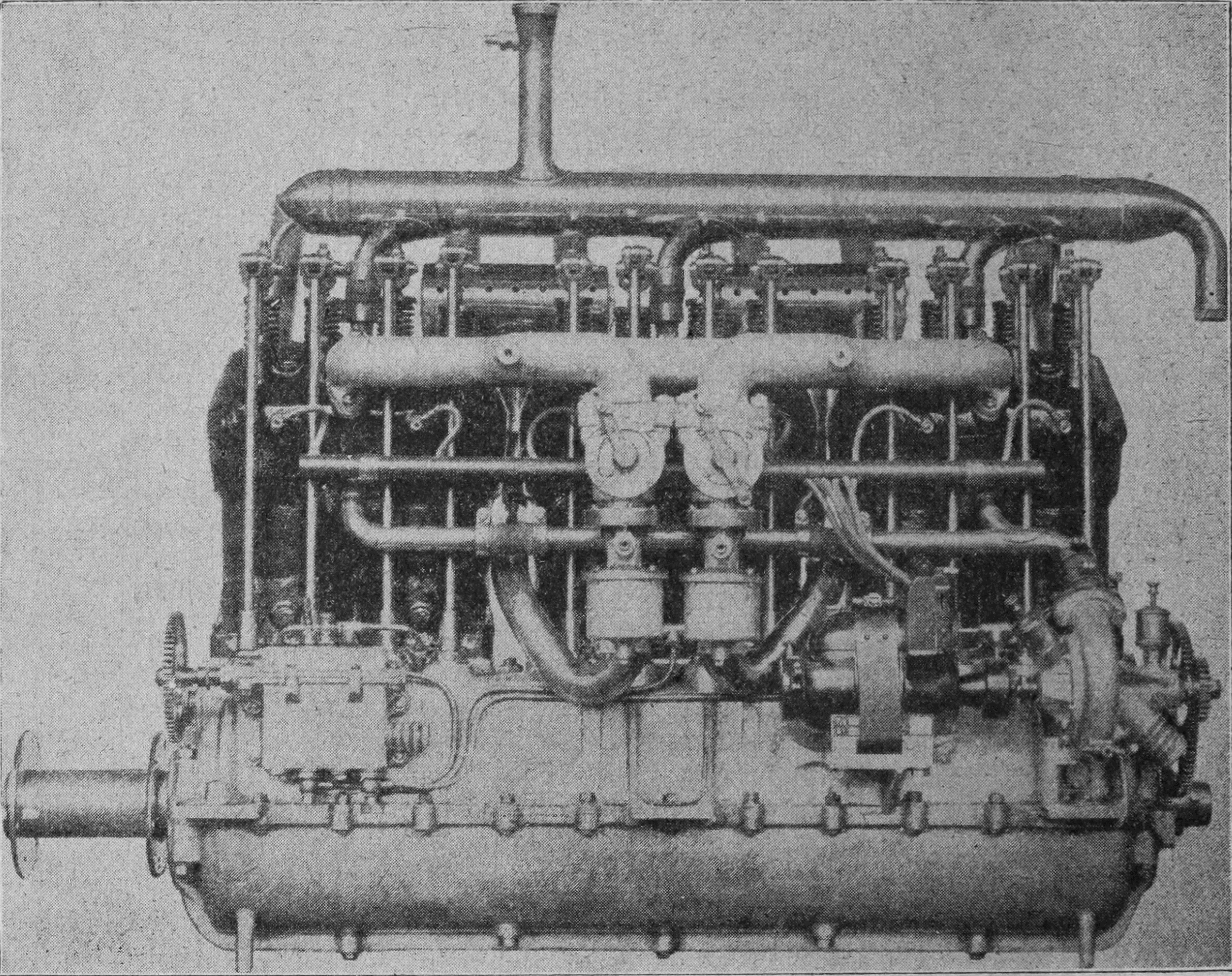
- Argus 115 hp aircraft engine, intake side
- Type: Piston inline aero engine
- National origin: Germany
- Manufacturer: Argus Motoren
- First run: c.1913
- Major applications: Jeannin Stahltaube (1913)
- Developed from: Argus 110 hp
- Developed into: Argus As II

The Argus 115 hp aircraft engine from 1913 was a six-cylinder, water cooled inline engine built by the German Argus Motoren company.

== Design and development ==
The Argus 115 hp engine was a development from the earlier Argus 110 hp engine of 1912. It featured an increased bore of 130 mm (5.12 in) and a stroke of 130 mm (5.12 in). In early 1913 the engine was already available and was said to deliver up to 115 hp (86 kW) at 1,400 rpm. The normal speed of the engine has been reported as 1,350 rpm.

Relative to the Argus 110 hp engine the main improvement besides the increased bore appears to be the introduction of a second magneto. To achieve this, the arrangement of the external engine components had been changed, with the water pump, now on the left side of the engine, directly coupled with one of the magnetos. The second magneto was driven via spur gears from the crankshaft and was located on the right hand side of the engine. The oil pump also had been relocated, now sitting separately on the engine case to the left, driven via spur gears from the camshaft at the propeller end.

When this engine later was tested by the Deutsche Versuchsanstalt für Luftfahrt in Berlin-Adlershof from 15 to 17 November 1913 it was and found to produce about 110 hp (82 kW) at 1,330 rpm.

While this engine is referred to as 105/115 hp Argus or 115 hp Argus in some publications, these engines typically were referred to as '100 hp Argus' engines in most contemporary reports, which at times makes it difficult to distinguish them from the 100 hp four-cylinder Argus As I or the Argus 110 hp.

First accounts for the use of this engine can be found in the reports for the 'Prinz-Heinrich-Flug' flying competition of 1913, which took place from May 10–17, 1913. Two aircraft with this engine have been enlisted, a Jeannin-Taube flown by Lt. Coerper, and an L.V.G.-biplane flown by Lt. Carganico, both powered by the Argus six-cylinder engine of 130 mm bore and stroke.

== Applications ==
- Jeannin Stahltaube (1913)
- L.V.G.-biplane (1913)
- Sikorsky Ilya Muromets No. 107, fitted with two 200 hp (150 kW) Salmson 2M7 and two Argus 115 hp engines.

== Specifications ==
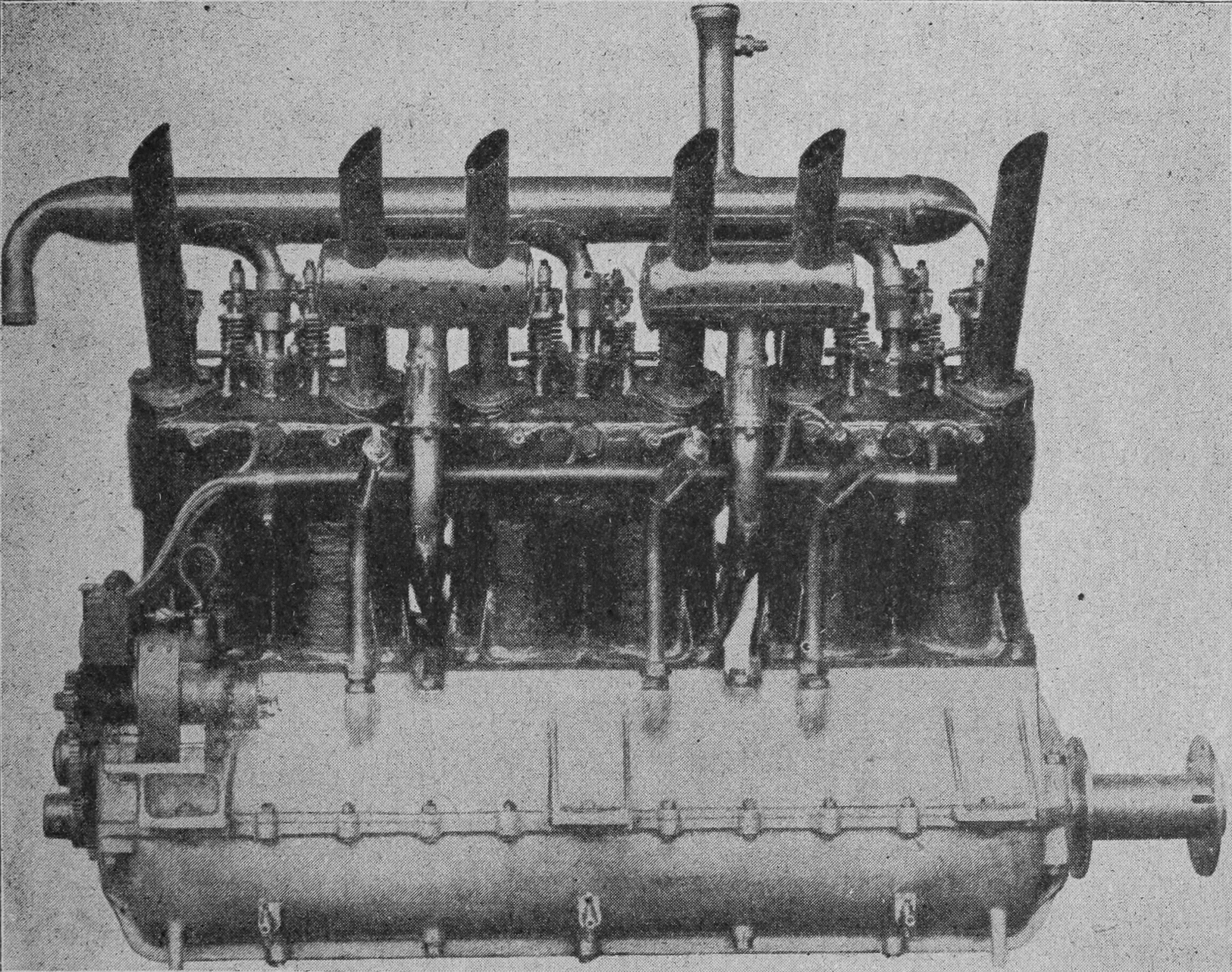
Argus 115 hp aircraft engine, exhaust side

Data from Huth

=== General characteristics ===
- Type: six-cylinder, water-cooled in-line piston engine
- Bore: 130 mm (5.12 in)
- Stroke: 130 mm (5.12 in)
- Dry weight: 200 kg (441 lb)

=== Components ===
- Cooling system: Water-cooled

=== Performance ===
- Power output: 115 hp (86 kW) at 1,400 rpm

== See also ==
Related development

- Argus As I
- Argus 110 hp
- Argus As II

Related lists

- List of aircraft engines
