= Argus 140/150 hp =

1910s German piston aircraft engine

Argus 140/150 hp 6-cylinder
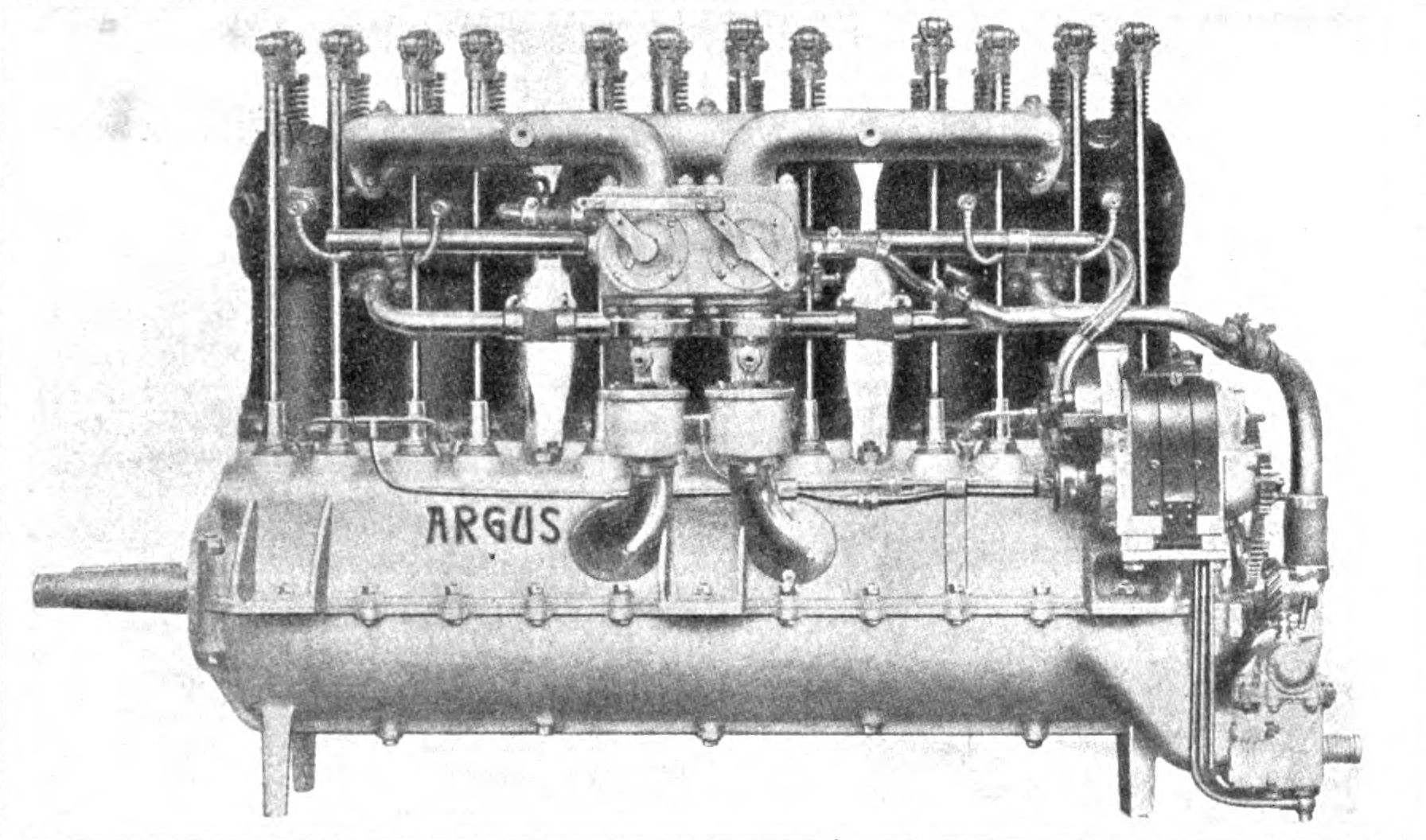
- Argus 140/150 hp 6-cylinder aircraft engine, intake side
- Type: Piston inline aero engine
- National origin: Germany
- Manufacturer: Argus Motoren
- First run: c.1913
- Major applications: Sikorsky Ilya Muromets Kievsky No 128
- Developed from: Argus As I, Argus 115 hp
- Developed into: Argus As II

The Argus 140/150 hp 6-cylinder aircraft engine from 1913 was a six-cylinder, water cooled inline engine built by the German Argus Motoren company from 1913 to 1914.

The engine design evolved from earlier four- and six-cylinder Argus engines and was produced in a 140/150 hp and a 120/130 hp variant with cylinder dimensions of 140 mm × 140 mm (5.5 in × 5.5 in) and 130 mm × 140 mm (5.1 in × 5.5 in) bore and stroke respectively. It was used in some German prewar racing aircraft and, most notably, also powered some of the Sikorsky Ilya Muromets aircraft.

The engine design however was relatively short lived and was succeeded already in 1914 by a new line-up of completely redesigned six-cylinder engines ranging from 120 to 200 hp, of which the 120 hp Argus As II became the most well known.

== Design and development ==
The first mentioning of the 150 hp six-cylinder Argus engine being offered in the Jeannin-Stahltaube can be found in early 1913. The engine had the same 140 mm (5.5 in) bore and stroke as the older 100 hp four-cylinder Argus engine and was said to develop up to 150 hp (110 kW) at 1,400 rpm.

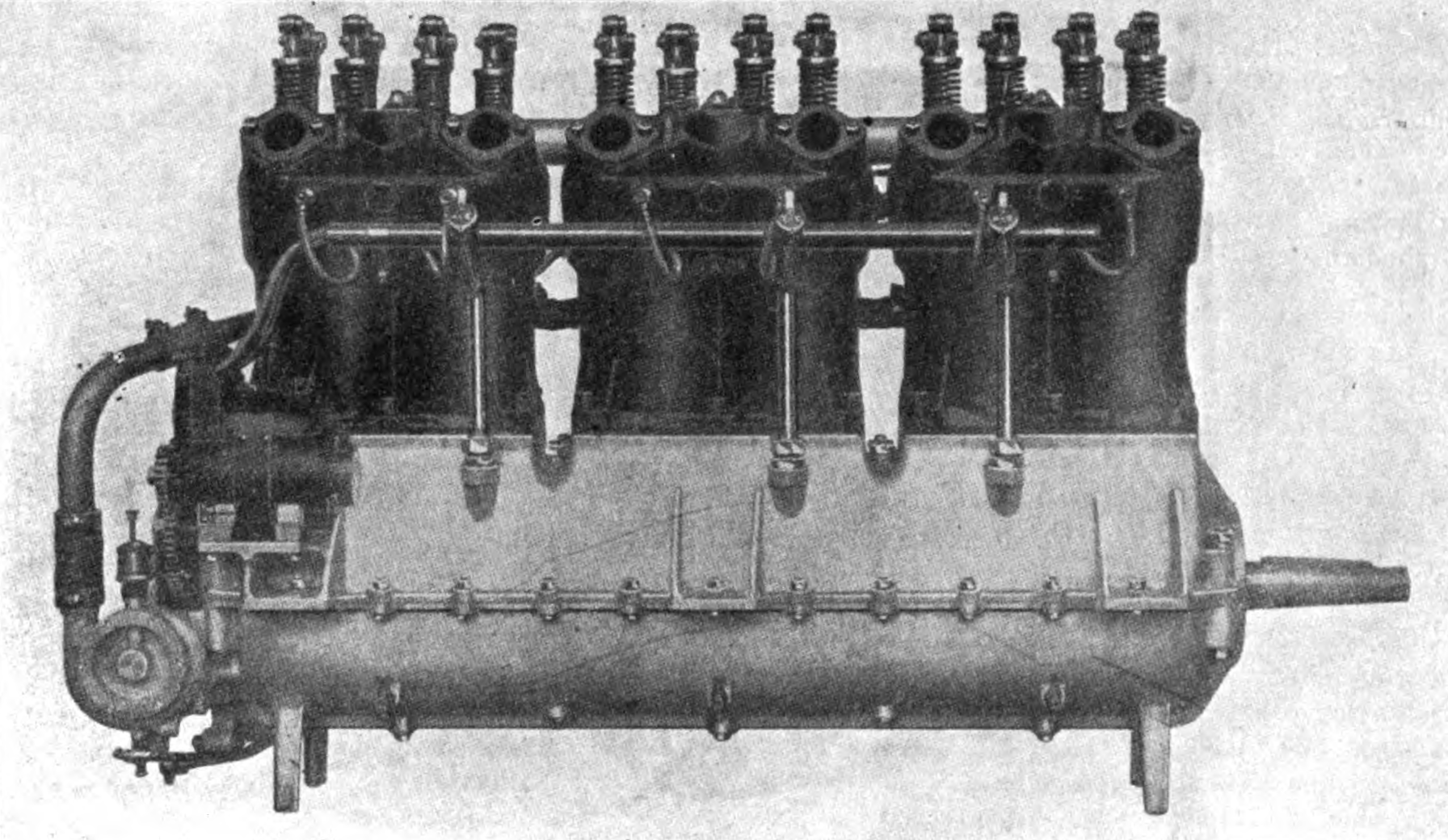
Argus 150 hp six-cylinder aircraft engine, c.1914, exhaust side

Compared with the preceding Argus six-cylinder engines once again the external components have been rearranged. Besides that the design of the engine remained largely similar to the preceding Argus engines.

The cylinders were of cast iron, cast in pairs of two cylinders, with the cooling jackets integral in the casting. There were two overhead valves per cylinder, which were operated via pushrods and rocker arms from the camshaft on the left side of the engine. The intake valves were oriented to the center of each cylinder pair, and their intake ducts were conjoined within the casting into a single external port facing to the left side of the engine.

Two Cudell-G.A.-carburettors were placed centrally on the left side of the engine in close proximity to each other. A heating jacket, integrated into the coolant circulation, enclosed both carburettors, which fed separately into the two intake pipes of the intake manifold. The intake manifold was made out of cast aluminum and consisted of two separate intake pipes, which fed into single distribution pipe, which then connected to all three cylinder pairs.

The pistons were made of cast iron and had two piston rings. Each cylinder pair was fixated to the crankcase by six bolts. The cylinders were axially offset to the crankshaft, which was supported by two inner plain bearings and two outer ball bearings.

The crankcase was made of aluminum and cast in separate upper and lower half parts, with the upper half having six mounting arms cast into it. The engine case was divided into three separate chambers by internal walls at the inner crankshaft bearings, with each chamber having a separate breather on the right hand side. Compared to the earlier 115 hp six-cylinder Argus the engine case had been slightly redesigned, with most notably the pedestals being elongated to accommodate for the additional height of the oil- and water pump assembly.

The centrifugal water pump has been moved to the lower right at the control side of the engine, mounted together with the oil pump on a transverse shaft, which was driven by helical gears from the crankshaft end. The water pump fed the coolant to the water cooled cylinders as well as to the carburettor's heating jacket from the left side. Lubrication was done by a combination of splash lubrication and additional forced lubrication of the plain bearings with fresh oil fed by the oil pump.

The two magnetos were mounted with their shafts in parallel to the engine, with one magneto placed on either side at the control end. The magnetos were driven via spur gears from the camshaft gear and from the crankshaft via an intermediate idler gear respectively.

== Variants ==
Argus 120/130 hp six-cylinder
(1913-1914), 120-130 hp, 130 mm × 140 mm (5.1 in × 5.5 in) bore and stroke
Argus 140/150 hp six-cylinder
(1913-1914), 140-150 hp, 140 mm × 140 mm (5.5 in × 5.5 in) bore and stroke

== Applications ==
- Aviatik P.14 (Argus 120/130 hp, e.g. Aviatik biplane of Willy Trück in German South West Africa)
- Jeannin Stahltaube (e.g. Argus 120/130 hp, Prinz-Heinrich-Flug 1914, No. 24 with pilot René Freindt)
- Sikorsky Ilya Muromets No 128 (two Argus 140 hp and two Argus 125 hp engines)

== Specifications (Argus 140/150 hp) ==
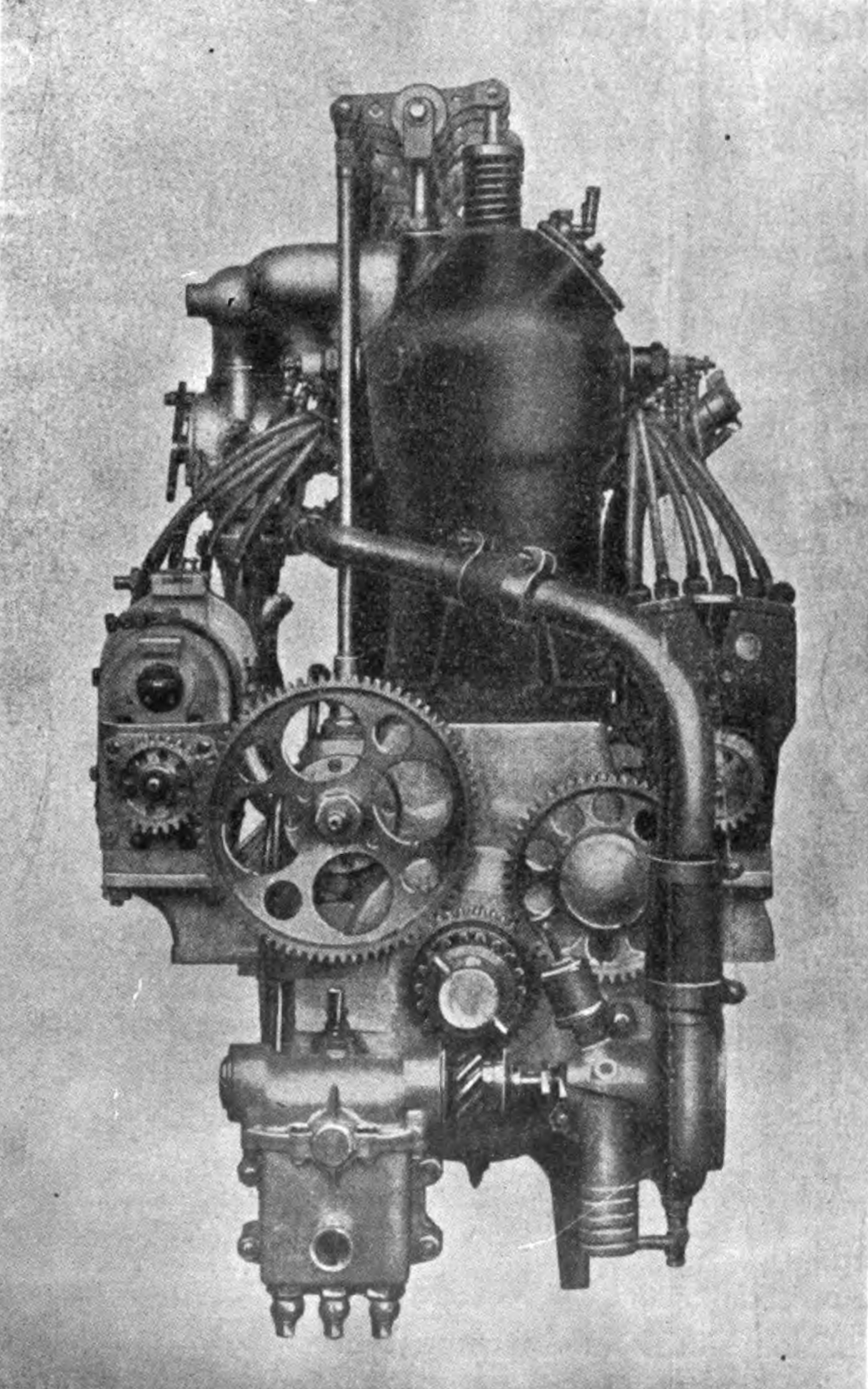
Argus 150 hp six-cylinder aircraft engine, c.1914, control side

Data from Huth.

=== General characteristics ===
- Type: six-cylinder, water-cooled in-line piston engine
- Bore: 140 mm (5.51 in)
- Stroke: 140 mm (5.51 in)
- Displacement: 12.9 L (790 cu in)
- Dry weight: 250 kg (551 lb)

=== Components ===
- Valvetrain: Cam-in-block, OHV
- Cooling system: Water-cooled

=== Performance ===
- Power output: 150 hp (110 kW) at 1,400 rpm

== See also ==
Related development

- Argus As I
- Argus 115 hp
- Argus As II

Related lists

- List of aircraft engines
