= Argus 110 hp =

1910s German piston aircraft engine

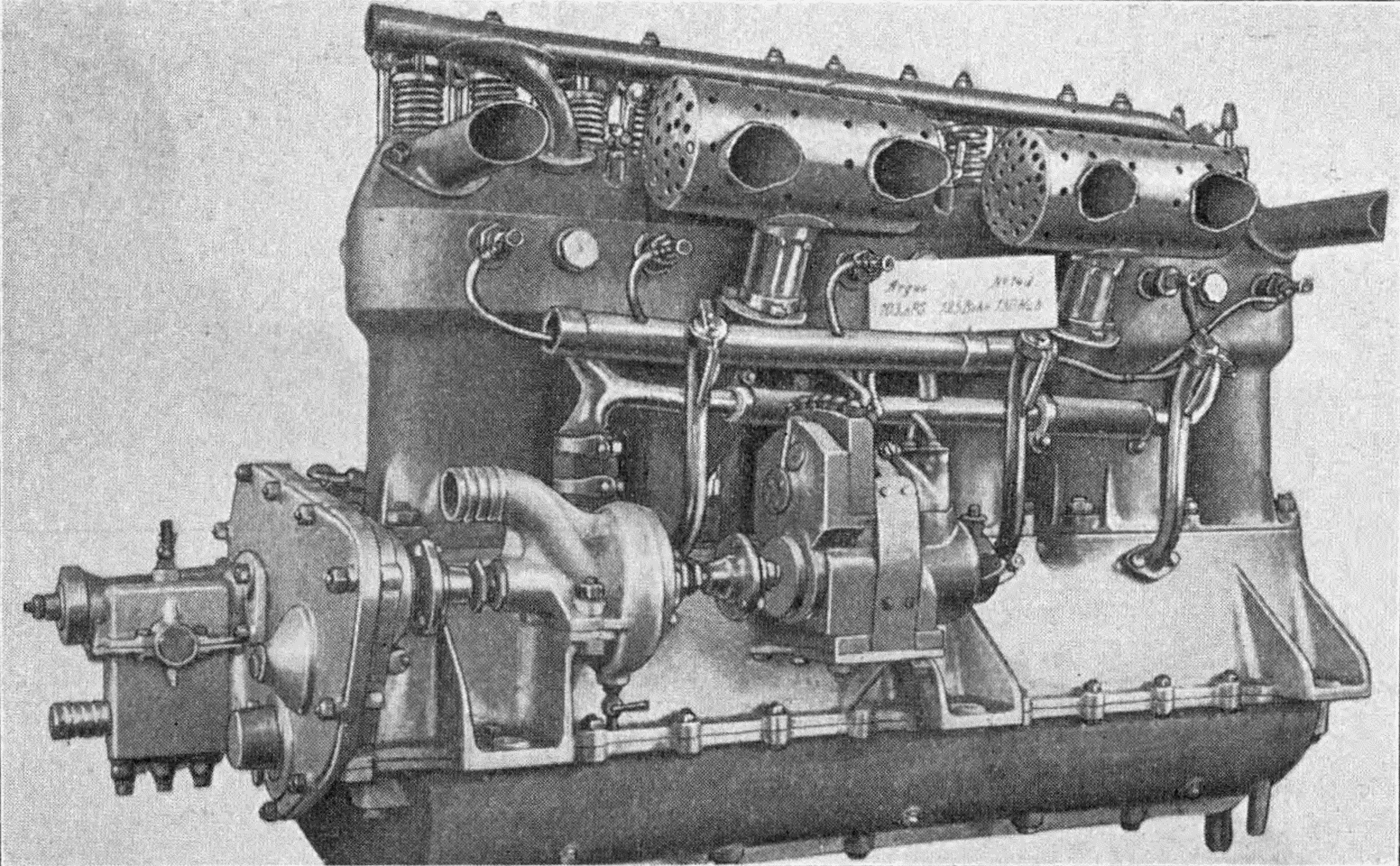
- Argus 110/103.5 hp aircraft engine, depicted in the reports to the Kaiserpreis aero-engine contest
- Type: Piston inline aero engine
- National origin: Germany
- Manufacturer: Argus Motoren
- First run: c.1912
- Developed into: Argus 115 hp

The Argus 110 hp aircraft engine, aka Argus Type III (not As.III), from 1912 was a six-cylinder, water cooled inline engine built by the German Argus Motoren company.

== Design and development ==
The first known six-cylinder aircraft engine produced by Argus Motoren has been mentioned in the submissions to the Kaiserpreis contest for aviation engines which was held in 1912/13. The list of submissions states the engine having a nominal rating of 110 hp (82 kW), with a bore of 125 mm (4.92 in) and a stroke of 130 mm (5.12 in). In the contest it developed 103.5 hp (77.2 kW) at 1,370 rpm while weighing 205.55 kg (453 lb).

The general design of the engine was carried over from the preceding four-cylinder Argus engines, particularly the 70 hp (52 kW) Argus engine, with which it shared the same cylinder dimensions: the engine cylinders were of cast iron, cast in pairs of two cylinders, with the cooling jackets integral in the casting. There were two overhead valves per cylinder, which were operated via pushrods and rocker arms from the camshaft on the left side of the engine. The intake valves were oriented to the center of each cylinder pair, and their intake ducts were conjoined within the casting into a single external port facing to the left side of the engine.

A design improvement over preceding Argus engines was the concentration of the oil pump together with the water pump and magneto at the rear of the engine. The centrifugal water pump was relocated from the left to the right side of the engine, where it was driven from the crankshaft via spur gears, with the magneto driven from the same layshaft. The oil pump was driven by the camshaft.

While the engine had two spark plugs per cylinder, it still had just a single magneto, with the lack of an independent second magneto on Argus' contemporary engines being criticized in reports for the prize contest.

== Applications ==
- Aviatik Floatplane 1913 (flown at Bodensee seaplane contest 1913, pilot Arthur Faller)

== Specifications ==
Data from Bendemann

=== General characteristics ===
- Type: six-cylinder, water-cooled in-line piston engine
- Bore: 125 mm (4.92 in) (other sources state 124 mm (4.88 in))
- Stroke: 130 mm (5.12 in)
- Dry weight: 205.55 kg (453 lb)

=== Components ===
- Cooling system: Water-cooled

=== Performance ===
- Power output: 103.5 hp (77.2 kW) at 1,370 rpm

== See also ==
Related development

- Argus As I
- Argus 115 hp

Related lists

- List of aircraft engines
