= Henry Farman HF.35 =

HF.35

General information
- Type: 3-seat armoured army co-operation / attack / escort fighter
- National origin: France
- Manufacturer: Farman Brothers
- Designer: Henri Farman
- Number built: 1

History
- First flight: December 1915

The Henri Farman HF.35 was a large 3-seat biplane designed and built in France by Henri Farman during 1915.

== Design and development ==
The HF.35 was designed and built to a 1915 C3 specification for a 3-seat armoured army co-operation, escort and attack aircraft. Following the contemporary practice of the Farman brothers, the HF.35 was a pusher biplane with a fuselage nacelle housing the crew and engine. The fuselage nacelle was supported on struts between the mainplanes and the tail unit was attached using a wire-braced strut framework attached to the wings. The 220 hp (160 kW) Renault 12Fa water-cooled V-12 engine was mounted as a pusher in the rear of the fuselage nacelle, cooled by radiators on either side of the nacelle between the wings. The pilot was seated in an open cockpit behind the gunners cockpit which sat two gunners with three machine-guns on flexible mounts. A four-wheel main undercarriage, similar to contemporary Voisin bombers, supported the aircraft on the ground. The wings were of unequal span with three bays and large over-hangs of the upper mainplanes. Construction was largely of metal with fabric and plywood skinning.

Only one HF.35 was built, which was flown in December 1915, with no orders forthcoming from the Aéronautique Militaire.

== Specifications (HF.35) ==
Data from French aircraft of the First World War

General characteristics

- Crew: 3 (pilot and 2 gunners)
- Capacity: 1,000 kg (2,200 lb) payload
- Length: 10.25 m (33 ft 8 in)
- Height: 3.6 m (11 ft 10 in)
- Powerplant: 1 × Renault 12Fa V-12 water-cooled piston engine, 160 kW (220 hp)

Performance

- Maximum speed: 165 km/h (103 mph, 89 kn)

Armament
3 machine-guns on flexible mounts in the nose cockpit

== Bibliography ==
- Liron, Jean (1984). Les avions Farman. Collection Docavia. Vol. 21. Paris: Éditions Larivière. OCLC 37146471.
