= Henri Farman HF.36 =

French prototype fighter plane of 1916

HF.36

General information
- Type: Fighter
- National origin: France
- Manufacturer: Farman
- Designer: Henri Farman
- Number built: 1

History
- First flight: July 1916

The Henri Farman HF.36 (sometimes identified simply as the Farman F.36) was a prototype French fighter aircraft built by Farman during the First World War. An unusual design, especially for Farman, it had a troubled development and was not selected for French Army service.

== Design ==
The HF.36 was a two-bay, unstaggered sesquiplane of overall conventional configuration that seated the pilot and gunner in tandem, open cockpits. However, in an era when aircraft were built mostly of wood and fabric, the HF.36 was unusual in being of metal construction. Although its tailskid undercarriage was the norm for its day, its quadricycle main undercarriage was not. Finally, while biplane fuselages are usually attached to the lower wing, and the upper wing is carried on struts about the fuselage, the HF.36 reversed this pattern, with a fuselage suspended from the upper wing, with the lower wing braced beneath it. The tail unit was of conventional design. Although tractor-engined designs were not unusual by this time, the design nevertheless represented a departure for Farman, a firm which had previously produced mostly pusher designs.

== Development ==
The first flight was in July 1916, but serious problems were found. A series of modifications were unable to overcome its deficiencies, and development was abandoned with only one prototype built.

== Specifications ==
Data from Liron 1984, p.46

General characteristics

- Crew: 2
- Length: 8.60 m (28 ft 3 in)
- Wingspan: 19.82 m (65 ft 0 in)
- Height: 3.49 m (11 ft 5 in)
- Wing area: 66.5 m^{2} (716 sq ft)
- Powerplant: 1 × Renault 12Fa liquid-cooled, twelve-cylinder V engine, 160 kW (220 hp)

Performance

- Maximum speed: 175 km/h (109 mph, 94 kn)

== Notes ==
=== Bibliography ===
- Davilla, James J.; Soltan, Arthur M. (1997). French Aircraft of the First World War. Stratford, CT: Flying Machine Press.
- The Illustrated Encyclopedia of Aircraft. London: Aerospace Publishing.
- Liron, Jean (1984). Les Avions Farman [The Farman Aeroplanes] (in French). Paris: Éditions Larivière.
