= Lioré et Olivier LeO 8 =

LeO 8

General information
- Type: Two seat reconnaissance aircraft and night fighter
- National origin: France
- Manufacturer: Lioré et Olivier
- Number built: 1

History
- First flight: January 1923

The Lioré et Olivier LeO 8, Lioré et Olivier LeO 8-Cau 2 or Lioré et Olivier LeO 8 CAN 2 was a French two seat, parasol wing monoplane night fighter and reconnaissance aircraft, built in 1923.

== Design and development ==
In April 1919 the Direction de l'Aéronautique (English: Aviation Directorate) initiated an aircraft design programme to replace the World War I machines serving with the Aéronautique Militaire. Several different types were sought, including a two-seat reconnaissance aircraft and night fighter. The Leo 8 was designed to meet this specification.

In the early 1920s French aircraft designers were beginning to appreciate the aerodynamic advantages of thick section wings on monoplanes, particularly their wide speed range even at high wing loadings. The Dewoitine D.1 was the first, followed by the LeO 8. The latter was a metal framed aircraft with a wing of almost rectangular plan and with constant profile, a form that simplified production as all its ribs were identical. The wing tips were slightly blunted and there was a rounded cut-out in its trailing edge for the pilot's head where he sat with the wing at eye level. The wing spars were rectangular duralumin tubes and the ribs were also duralumin. The wings were fabric covered and their outer trailing edges carried narrow chord unbalanced ailerons over half the span.

Wing and fuselage were joined by two parallel pairs of streamlined struts on each side, the members of each pair attached to the forward and rear spars. The innermost pair connected the wing at about one-third span to the upper fuselage longeron and the outer pair ran from about two-thirds span to an undercarriage extension. Each pair was wire braced and the each outer pair also braced from their midpoints to the upper ends of the inner pair.

The fuselage of the LeO 8 was also built from duralumin, with four rectangularly braced longerons, assisted by internal wire bracing, forming a simple flat sided structure with forward aluminium panels at the front and fabric covering aft. The aluminium covered section included the nose mounted, 224 kW (300 hp), twelve-cylinder Renault 12F engine and the underwing region in front of the pilot's open cockpit. The nose was rounded in plan but not profile. The engine was liquid cooled by finned, cylindrical Lamblin radiators hung separately below it and had a tall, single, central exhaust above. Fabric covering began at front of the pilot's cockpit; the gunner's cockpit was immediately behind the pilot's and further aft the fuselage tapered to the tail, where a narrow chord, variable incidence tailplane was mounted on its top. All the rear surfaces were aluminium framed and fabric covered. The broad fin and rudder had vertical edges but an angled top; the rudder extended to the bottom of the fuselage, working through a small cut-out in the elevators. The fixed undercarriage of the LeO 8 consisted of a rectangular frame mounted from the lower fuselage longerons by a parallel pair of struts on each side. A pair of single wheels were attached to the frame, which was enclosed in a streamlined fairing of wing-like profile that added 2 m^{2} (21.5 sq ft) to the wing area. There was a sprung steel skid under the tail.

The rear gunner operated a mounted pair of Lewis guns and provision was made for a pair of fixed, forward firing Vickers machine guns.

== Operational history ==
The LeO 8 made its first flight in January 1923 from Villacoublay. (Note: Green and Swanborough give the date as April 1923 but the Aérophile account makes it clear that it took place before 1 February.) The prototype flew with a machine gun mounted in the rear cockpit but at the time its simple construction, choice of engines, relatively high speed at altitude and a low landing speed suggested civilian as well as military uses. No military order was placed; instead the sole LeO 8 was prepared for an attempt on the altitude record for an aircraft carrying a 500 kg (1,102 lb) load. This was tried in 1925 but ended in a fatal accident.

== Specifications ==
Data from L'Aerophile 1–15 March 1923 p.24

General characteristics

- Crew: Two
- Length: 8.70 m (28 ft 7 in)
- Wingspan: 15.55 m (51 ft 0 in)
- Height: 3.50 m (11 ft 6 in)
- Wing area: 32 m^{2} (340 sq ft)
- Airfoil: Göttingen 430
- Empty weight: 1,245 kg (2,745 lb)
- Gross weight: 1,875 kg (4,134 lb)
- Powerplant: 1 × Renault 12Fe 12-cylinder liquid cooled, 220 kW (300 hp)
- Propellers: 2-bladed

Performance

- Maximum speed: 195 km/h (121 mph, 105 kn) at 3,000 m (9,843 ft)
- Stall speed: 80 km/h (50 mph, 43 kn) at sea level
- Service ceiling: 6,500 m (21,300 ft)

== Bibliography ==
- Hartmann, Gérard. Les Avions Lioré Et Olivier. Boulogne-Billancourt, France: ETAI. 2002. ISBN 2-7268-8607-8 (in French)
