= Sikorsky Russky Vityaz =

1913 aircraft by Igor Sikorsky

Russky Vityaz
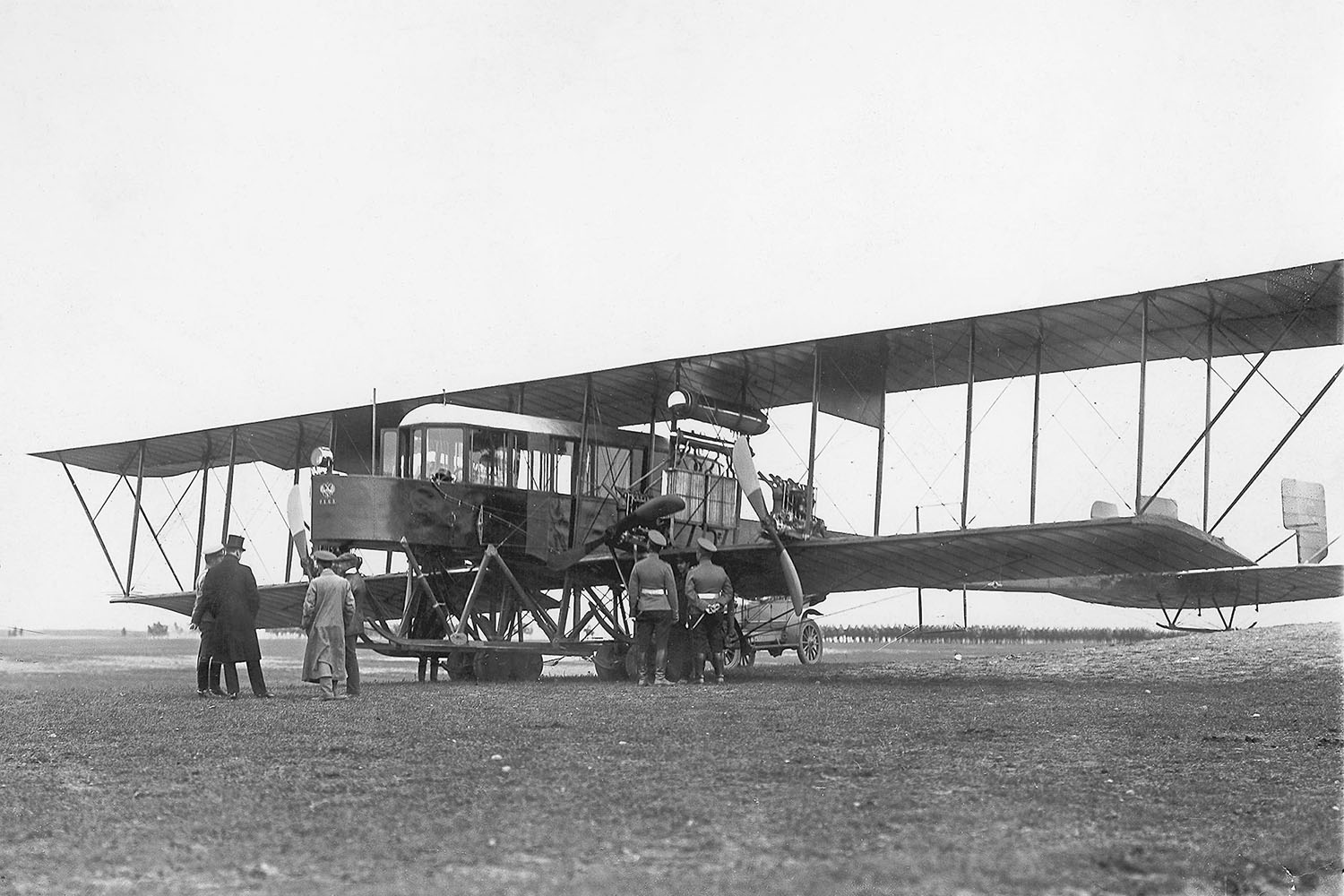
- The definitive Russky Vityaz version with four tractor configuration engines.

General information
- Type: Airliner
- Manufacturer: Russian Baltic Railroad Car Works
- Designer: Igor Sikorsky
- Number built: 1

History
- First flight: 10 May 1913 O.S.

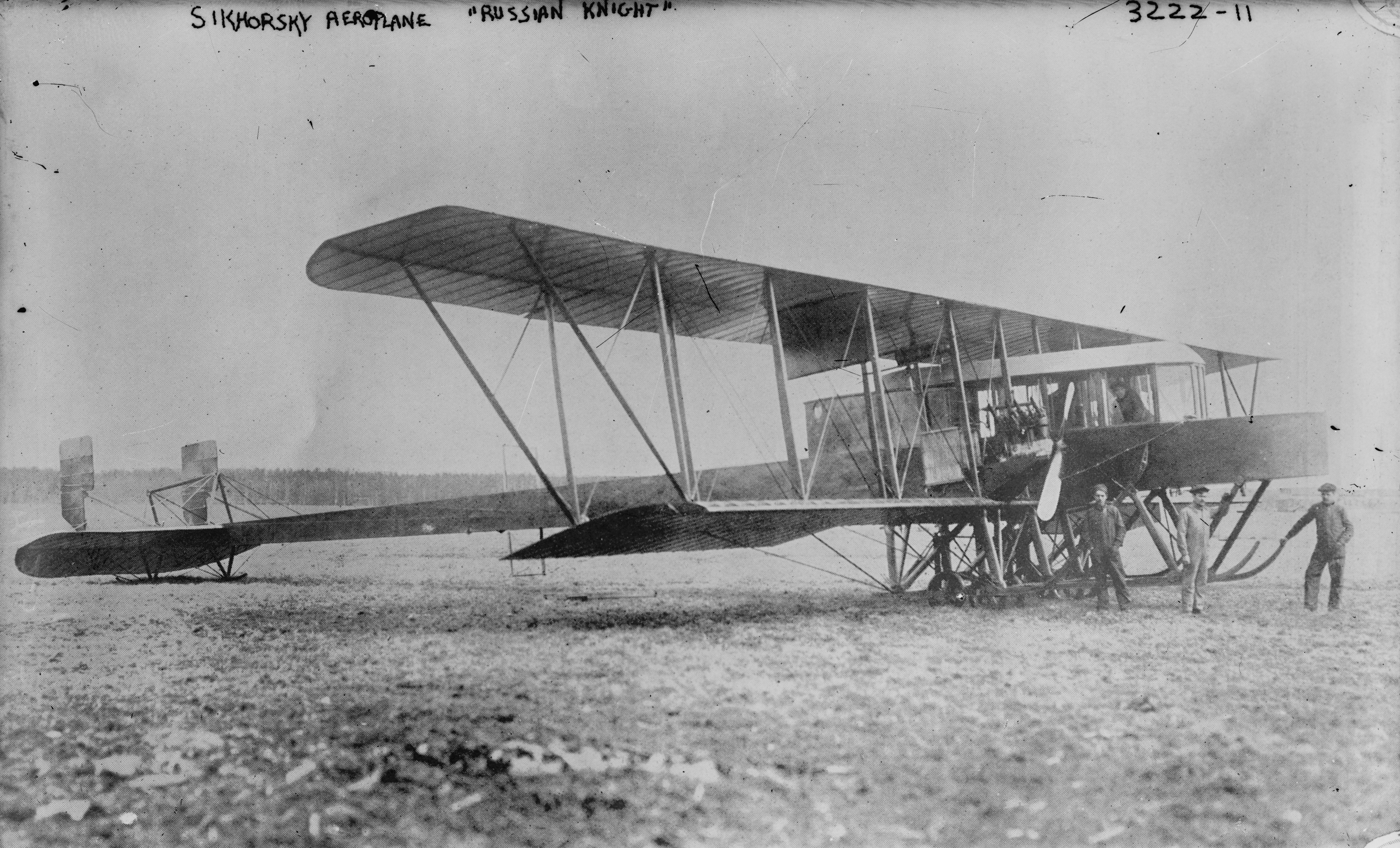
Early "Le Grand" version with two engines.

The Sikorsky Russky Vityaz (Russian: Русский витязь), or Russian Knight (S-21), previously known as the Bolshoi Baltisky (Russian: Большой Балтийский) (The Great Baltic) in its first four-engined version, was the first four-engine aircraft in the world, designed by Igor Sikorsky and built at the Russian Baltic Railroad Car Works (Russo-Baltiiskyi Vagonnyi Zavod or R-BVZ) in Saint Petersburg in early 1913.

== Development ==
Sikorsky conceived the S-21 design in 1911, when no known aircraft could lift more than 600 kilograms (1,323 lb). The carrying capacity record belonged to the French pilot Ducis, who had flown 800 m (2,600 ft) with a load of 600 kg (1,323 lb). On hearing about the construction of the Russky Vityaz in early 1913, the experts and the media around the world were predicting a complete failure. The first aerial test of the Russky Vityaz on 10 May 1913 was successful. At the time, many people in other parts of the world considered it to be a newspaper hoax, and did not believe it. Observers believed that an aircraft of such dimensions would never leave the ground.

== Design ==
The Russky Vityaz was a four-engine multi-bay biplane with unequal-span wings. The dual-spar wings had a rectangular planform and a chord of 2.5 m (8 ft 2 in). The distance between the wings (wing gap) was also 2.5 m (8 ft 2 in). Its fuselage was a rectangular section girder, covered with plywood sheets. The aircraft had a cabin with dual control columns, two passenger cabins and a storage room for spare parts. There was also an open deck forward of the pilot's cabin equipped with a searchlight and machine gun. The ailerons on the upper wings provided for the airplane's stability. The first quadruple-engined version of what was to become known as the Russky Vityaz, originally known as the Bolshoi Baltisky (Great Baltic), was powered by four engines installed in tandem pairs (it was originally designed as a twin-engine plane, known as "Le Grand"). The Russky Vityaz relocated the twin pusher engines from the Bolshoi Baltisky's layout onto the leading edge of the lower wing as tractor configuration powerplants, outboard of the original inner tractor configuration engines.

Sikorsky described the airplane's instruments, "There were four tachometers for the engines, two altimeters, a U-glass tube with alcohol connected to a sort of pressure receiver to indicate the flying speed, a ball in a curved glass tube to work as bank indicator and a long streamline tube mounted some three feet ahead of the window with divisions to indicate the incidence. The three latter instruments were 'home made,' designed for the 'Grand.' They were particularly necessary because of the enclosed cabin."

== Operational history ==
After the Russky Vityaz's first test flights between 10 and 27 May 1913 O.S., it was established that a passenger could even walk around the cabins without causing any problems to stability. The aircraft left the ground after a 700-meter (2,300 ft) takeoff run.

After the first test flight with his co-pilot and mechanic on board, Sikorsky noted, "in order to keep the engines close to the center line, they were mounted in two tandem groups on both sides of the fuselage. This was done chiefly to protect the plane from the danger of unsymmetrical thrust if one of the outer engines should stop." However, this configuration resulted in poor take-off and climb performance, due to propeller inefficiency. In June 1913, the airplane was altered so that the two rear engines were remounted outboard on the leading edges, "...transforming the installation into a four-in-line. The change resulted in a substantially improved take-off and a slightly better climb. The rudders were still effective enough to hold the plane against two engines stopped on one side." On 2 August Sikorsky flew the "Grand" for one hour and fifty-four minutes with eight persons on board.

Sikorsky made a total of fifty-three flights with the "Grand" before it was damaged by falling debris from a different aircraft. While parked on the runway on 23 June 1913, the aircraft was crushed by an engine that fell off a single-seat Morane-Saulnier aircraft during a landing. Sikorsky decided not to repair the seriously damaged Russky Vityaz and began working on his next brainchild — the Ilya Muromets.

== Specifications (Russky Vityaz) ==
Data from Milestones of the Air

General characteristics

- Crew: three
- Capacity: up to seven passengers
- Length: 20 m (65 ft 7 in)
- Upper wingspan: 28 m (91 ft 10 in)
- Lower wingspan: 20 m (65 ft 7 in)
- Height: 4 m (13 ft 1 in)
- Wing area: 120 m^{2} (1,300 sq ft)
- Empty weight: 2,700 kg (5,952 lb)
- Gross weight: 4,000 kg (8,818 lb)
- Max takeoff weight: 4,940 kg (10,891 lb)
- Powerplant: 4 × Argus As I 4-cylinder water-cooled in-line piston engine, 75 kW (100 hp) each

Performance

- Maximum speed: 90 km/h (56 mph, 49 kn)
- Range: 170 km (110 mi, 92 nmi)
- Service ceiling: 600 m (2,000 ft)
