= Farman F.80 =

General information
- Type: Basic training biplane
- National origin: France
- Manufacturer: Farman
- Number built: 9

History
- First flight: 1920s

The Farman F.80 was a 1920s French biplane designed by Farman as a basic trainer.

== Development ==
The F.80 was intended to compete against the Hanriot HD-14 as a basic trainer. It was an equal span two-bay tractor biplane with tandem open cockpits for instructor and pupil. It had a tailskid landing gear with the two main units widely spaced for stability on the ground. The aircraft also had a pair of auxiliary wheels in front to prevent the aircraft nosing-over on the ground and damaging what was then an expensive wooden propeller.

The aircraft did not meet with any success and was not ordered into production.

Data from

General characteristics

- Crew: 2 (instructor, pupil)
- Length: 8.20 m (26 ft 11 in)
- Wingspan: 13.0 m (42 ft 8 in)
- Wing area: 46.50 m^{2} (500.5 sq ft)
- Empty weight: 770 kg (1,698 lb)
- Gross weight: 1,100 kg (2,425 lb)
- Powerplant: 1 × Renault 8Gd 50° V-8 piston engine, 142 kW (190 hp)

Performance

- Maximum speed: 150 km/h (93 mph, 81 kn)
- Cruise speed: 150 km/h (93 mph, 81 kn)

== Bibliography ==
- The Illustrated Encyclopedia of Aircraft (Part Work 1982-1985). Orbis Publishing.
- Liron, Jean (1984). Les avions Farman. Collection Docavia. Vol. 21. Paris: Éditions Larivière. OCLC 37146471.
