= Renault 8G =

1910s French piston aircraft engine

8G
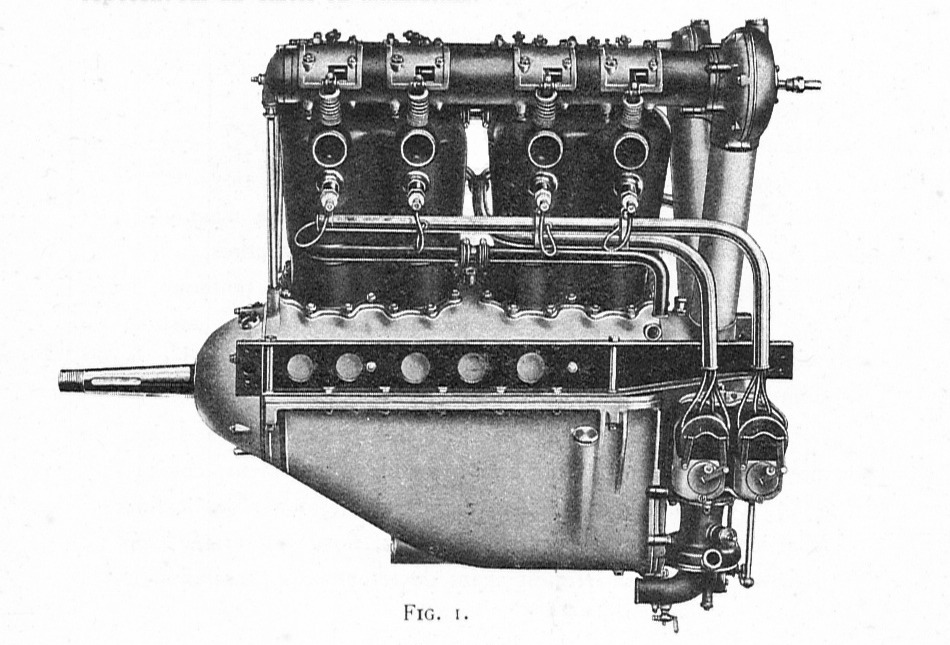
- Type: Liquid-cooled V-8 piston engine
- National origin: France
- Manufacturer: Renault
- Major applications: Dorand AR.1
- Developed into: Renault 12F

The Renault 8G was a family of French liquid-cooled V8 aero engines of the World War I era that produced from 140 hp (100 kW) to 190 hp (140 kW).

== Design and development ==
Construction used separate cast iron blocks for each pair of cylinders, mounted on a light-alloy crankcase with an included vee angle of 50 degrees. Each bank had a single overhead camshaft, shaft-driven through bevel gears. It was equipped with a single dual-choke updraught Zenith carburettor, and twin spark ignition through four magnetos. The crankshaft was a flat plane with three bearings and four throws, each pair of cylinders sharing a master-slave connecting rod onto the same crankpin.

== Variants ==
8G
140 hp (100 kW)
8Ga
150 hp (110 kW)
8Gb
160 hp (120 kW)
8Gc
175 hp (130 kW)
8Gd
190 hp (140 kW)
8Gdy
200 hp (150 kW)
8Ge
200 hp (150 kW)

== Applications ==
- Dorand AR.1 - Renault 8Gd - 1917
- Farman F.80 - Renault 8Gd
- Dorand AR.2 - Renault 8Gdy

== Specifications (8Gd) ==
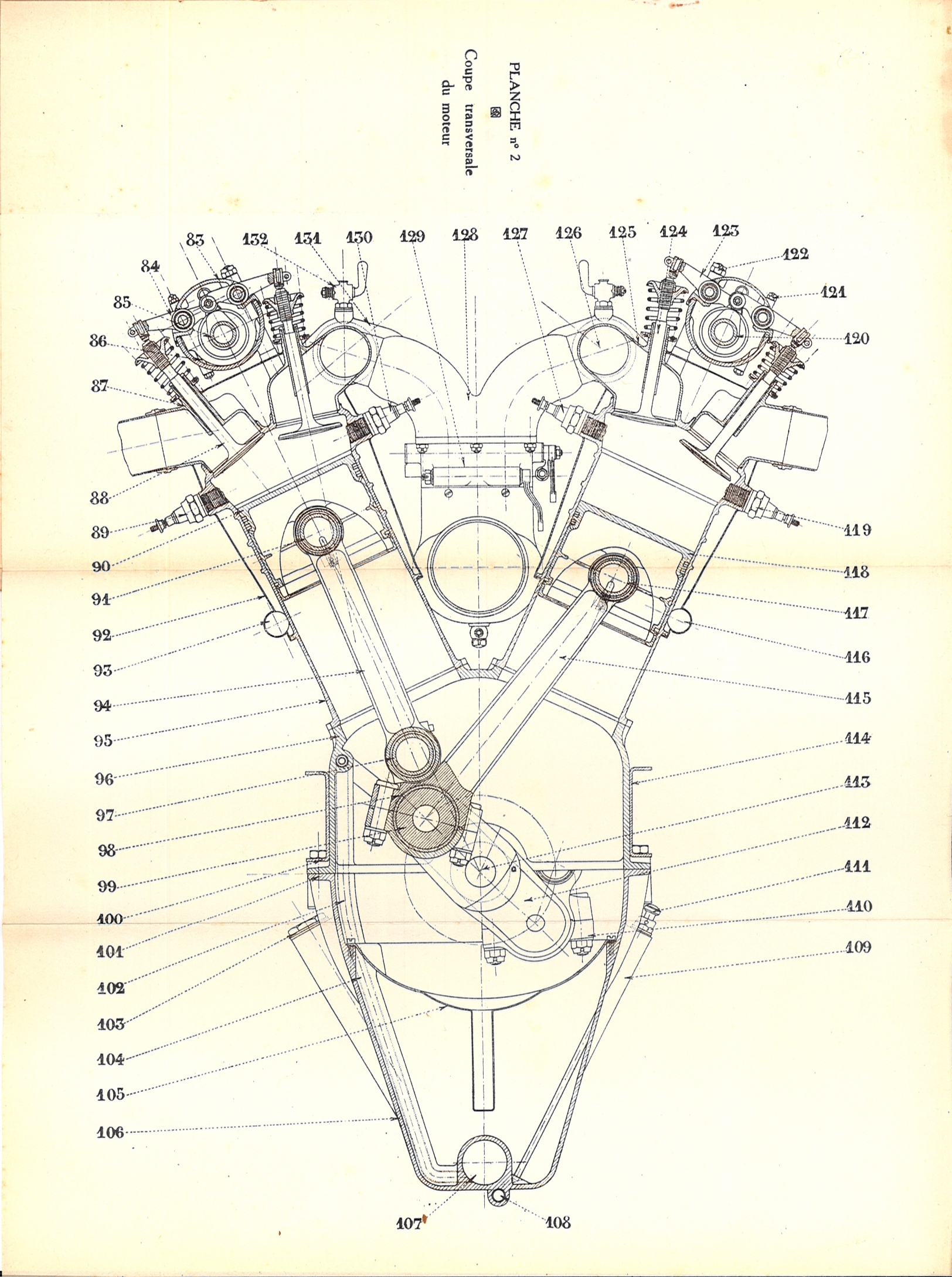
Section on cylinder

Data from

=== General characteristics ===
- Type: 50° V8 naturally aspirated liquid-cooled aircraft engine
- Bore: 125 mm (4.9 in)
- Stroke: 150 mm (5.9 in)
- Displacement: 14.7 L (900 in^{3})

=== Components ===
- Valvetrain: Overhead camshaft-actuated, single intake and single exhaust valve per cylinder
- Fuel system: Twin-choke updraught carburettor
- Oil system: Wet sump
- Cooling system: Water

=== Performance ===
- Power output:
- 192 hp (143 kW) at 1,500 rpm
- 196 hp (146 kW) at 1,550 rpm son régime normal
- 200 hp (150 kW) at 1,600 rpm son régime maximum
- Specific power: 9.93 kW/L (0.22 hp/in^{3})

== See also ==
Related development

- Renault 12F - A family of V12 engines sharing the same cylinder size and bank angle as the 8G

Comparable engines

- Hispano-Suiza 8
- Sunbeam Arab

Related lists

- List of aircraft engines
