= Argus As II =

1910s German piston aircraft engine

As II
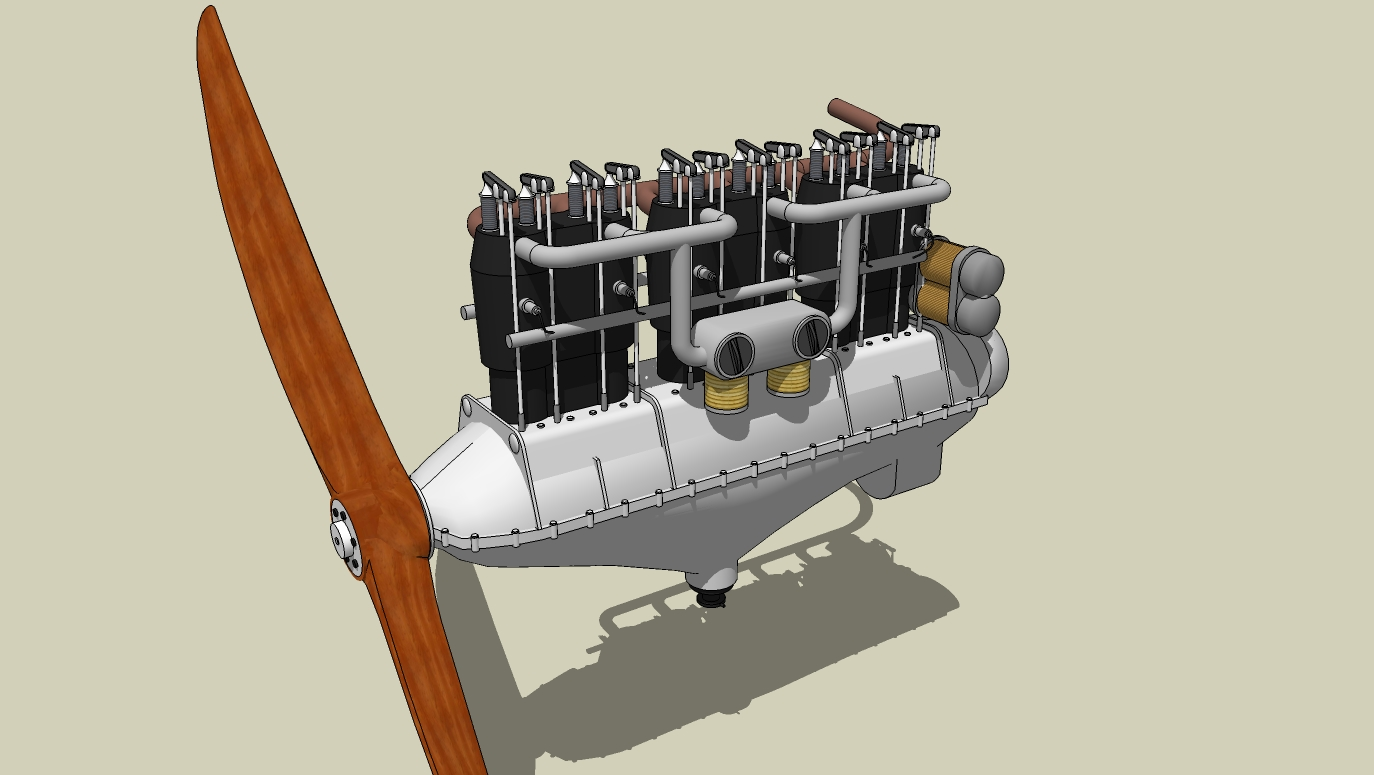
- Argus As.II artist drawing
- Type: Piston aircraft engine
- Manufacturer: Argus Motoren
- First run: 1914

The Argus As II was a six-cylinder, in-line, water-cooled, aircraft engine produced in Germany by Argus Motoren in 1914. The Argus As II produced 120 hp (89 kW) at 1,350 rpm.

== Design and development ==
The Argus As II was a major redesign compared to the preceding Argus 120/130 hp and Argus 140/150 hp six-cylinder engines. Alongside many other changes, the major improvements were the introduction of newly designed steel cylinders and the completely redesigned crankcase, which now had an integrated oil pump and a completely modernized lubrication system.

The cylinders were machined from steel separately, with intake and exhaust ducts as well as cooling jackets welded in place in a separate step. While the steel cylinders were still combined to pairs, sharing the same cooling jacket, the change to steel cylinders was accompanied by a change in the design of the intake ducts and the pushrod arrangement. Contrary to the old design, which had the two intake ducts conjoined into a single one, the new design had separate intake ducts for each cylinder. This also necessitated a slight change in the valvetrain, with the two pushrods now placed separately to both sides of the intake duct, instead of both pushrods being placed at one side of the combined intake duct in the older design. Also the number of mounting bolts for the cylinders has been increased, with each cylinder pair now being held to the crankcase by ten bolts.

Cast iron cylinders like in the previous engine design were also available, although in updated form to match the redesigned engine parts (i.e. separate intake ducts, new pushrod arrangement and increased number of crankcase mounting bolts).

The intake manifold had been adapted to match the new arrangement of intake ducts on the cylinders. Two Cudell-G.A.-carburettors were placed centrally on the left side of the engine in close proximity to each other. A heating jacket, integrated into the coolant circulation, enclosed both carburettors. Each carburettor fed into one of the two separate intake manifold pipes, which fed three cylinders each.

The crankcase was made of aluminum and cast in separate upper and lower half parts, with the upper half having mounting arms cast into it. The crankshaft was supported by two intermediate and two outer plain bearings, with additional thrust ball bearings at the propeller end. The propeller had an increased clearance to the first cylinder due to the conical nose of the crankcase at the propeller end necessary to hold the bearings.

Lubrication was forced, with a piston pump located mid engine at the bottom of the crankcase, collecting and recirculating the oil from the crankcase. Small amounts of fresh oil were augmented by the piston pump automatically. The oil was fed to the main journals of the crankshaft, from where it was passed into the hollowed out crankshaft and then to the crankpins via drilled oil passages. The oil also was further distributed to the connecting rods piston end via copper oil conduits.

The camshaft was driven from the crankshaft via an intermediate spur gear on the control end, and two additional vertical layshafts, both driven from the crankshaft via bevel gears, were used to drive the magnetos and the water- as well as the oil pump. The centrifugal water pump, located on the lower end, was driven directly from the lower layshaft, while the oil pump was driven from the lower layshaft via bevel gears and an additional horizontal driveshaft and worm gear. The upper layshaft provided the tachometer output and also was used to drive the two magnetos, which were mounted transversely and driven via separate bevel gears.

== Applications ==
- Albatros B.II
- Friedrichshafen FF.29, Marine Number 290-296
- Germania B.I
- Häfeli DH-1
- Häfeli DH-3
- Halberstadt D.II
- Jeannin Stahltaube (1914)

== Engines on display ==
- An Argus As II is on display at the Fliegermuseum in Duebendorf, Switzerland.

== Specifications ==
Data from Huth.

=== General characteristics ===
- Type: Six-cylinder, upright, inline, liquid-cooled piston engine
- Bore: 130 mm (5.12 in)
- Stroke: 140 mm (5.51 in)
- Displacement: 11.1 L (680 cu in)
- Dry weight: 230 kg (510 lb)

=== Components ===
- Valvetrain: Overhead-valve, two valves per cylinder, pushrod operated
- Fuel system: Twin carburettors
- Oil system: Pressure feed
- Cooling system: Liquid-cooled
- Reduction gear: Direct drive

=== Performance ===
- Power output: 125.8 hp (93.8 kW) at 1,400 rpm
- Compression ratio: 3.7

== See also ==
Comparable engines

- Mercedes D.II

Related lists

- List of aircraft engines
