= F30 =

F30 may refer to:

== Vehicles ==
=== Aircraft ===
- Farman F.30, a French biplane
- de Havilland Vampire F.30, a British jet fighter plane
- Golden Avio F30, an Italian ultralight

=== Automobiles ===
- Alpina B3 (F30), a German sedan
- BMW 3 Series (F30), a German sedan
- Farmall F-30, an American tractor
- Kaicene F30, a Chinese pickup truck
- Nissan Leopard F30, a Japanese sedan
- Toyota Kijang (F30), a Japanese pickup truck

=== Ships ===
- HMS Forfar (F30), an armed merchant cruiser of the British Royal Navy
- HMS Venturous (F30), a World War I V-class British Royal Navy warship originally built as a minelayer
- HMS Wuchang (F30), a British Royal Navy submarine tender

== Other uses ==
- F-30 (Michigan county highway), Alcona County, Michigan, United States
- Fujifilm FinePix F-30, a digital camera
- Hirth F-30, an aircraft engine
- Mania (ICD-10 code F30)

== See also ==
- Conquest X-30, a G.I.Joe fictional FSW fighter airplane, sometimes referred to as "F-30"
- 30 (disambiguation)
