= Farman HF.30 =

Biplane model

HF.30
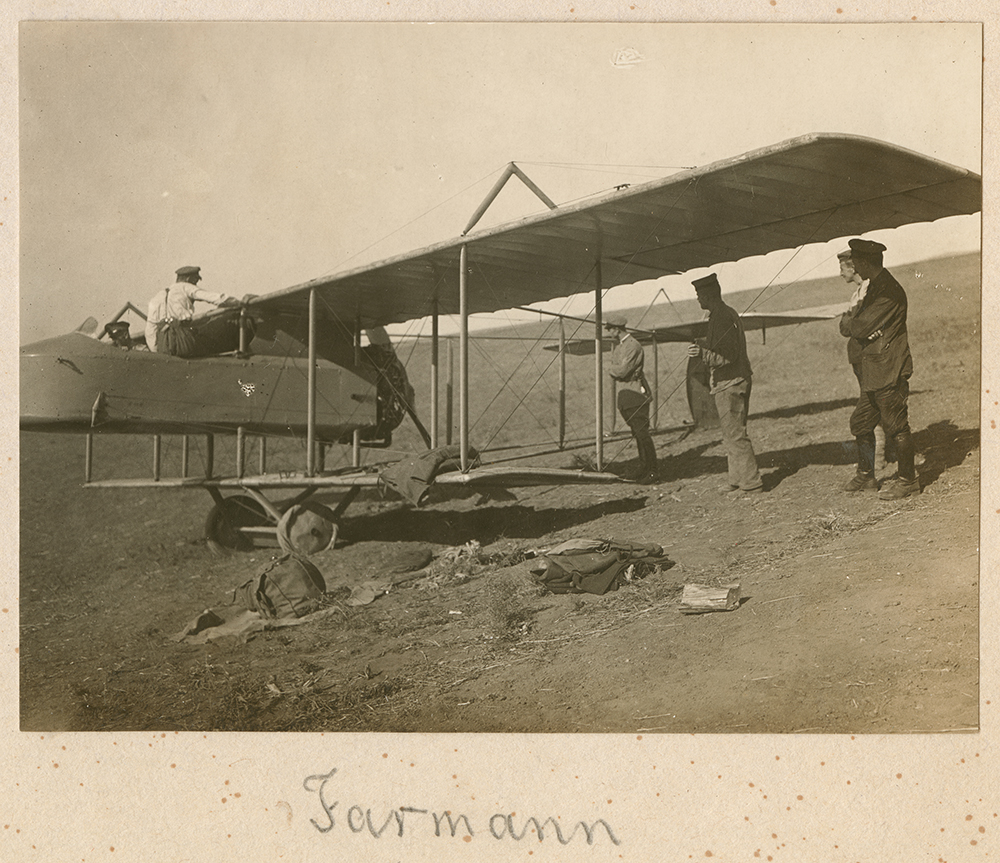

General information
- Type: Scout
- National origin: France
- Manufacturer: Dux Factory
- Designer: Henry Farman
- Primary user: Imperial Russian Air Service
- Number built: 400+

History
- Manufactured: 1915-1921
- Introduction date: 1915
- Retired: 1924
- Developed from: Farman HF.27

The Henry Farman HF.30 was a two-seat military biplane designed in France around 1915, which became a principal aircraft of the Imperial Russian Air Service during the First World War. Although it was widely used on the Eastern Front, and by the factions and governments that emerged in the subsequent Russian Civil War, it is not well known outside that context: the HF.30 was not adopted by other Allied air forces, and the manufacturers reused the "Farman F.30" designation for the Farman F.30 in 1917. (Note: Most descriptions appear to be based on Shavrov. W.M. Lamberton and E.F. Cheesman, Reconnaissance & bomber aircraft of the 1914-1918 War (Letchworth: Harleyford, 1960), p. 88 attribute it to "a 160 h.p. Canton-Unné engine", a description that better describes the motor of the 1917 fighter, and treat it, with little explanation, as a variant of the F.40 bomber.)

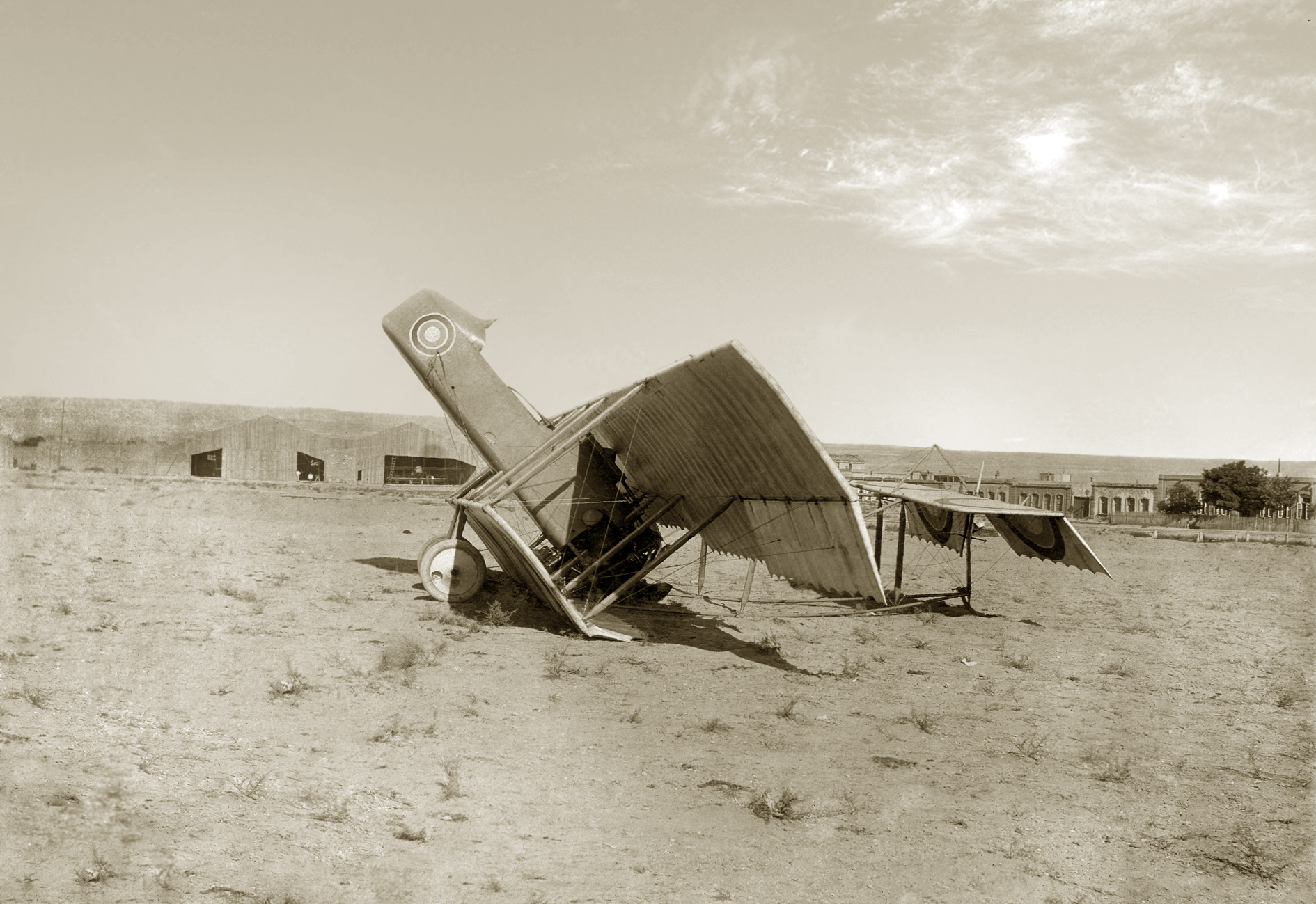
An imperial Russian Air Service HF.30 in less than sparkling condition at Baku

== Design and development ==
The HF.30 was one of the final variants of the "Farman type", a distinctive aircraft layout developed by the Anglo-French brothers Henry and Maurice Farman. These were biplanes of a pusher configuration, with the propeller at the rear of the engine, behind the wings. The crew of two (pilot and observer) sat in front in an open cockpit, the wings were of a simple unstaggered) design, while the rear part of the plane was just a wire-braced framework supporting the tail.

The basic airframe of the HF.30 was very similar to the earlier and slightly smaller F.20, a two-bay biplane with a shorter lower wing (a primitive sesquiplane layout), a reasonably long v-shaped tail framework, and similar control surfaces - ailerons on the outer sections of the upper wings, and a single rudder and a high tailplane at the rear. It differed by reviving the raised fuselage position of the 1913 MF.11, positioning the cockpit and engine half-way between the wings rather than mounting them directly on top of the lower wing, and it was the first Farman to adopt the simple and robust v-strut undercarriage that was becoming standard. Perhaps most importantly, it improved on the underpowered F.20 by utilizing the much more potent 150 hp (110 kW) Salmson 9 radial engine. (Note: The 150hp Salmson P9 engine is cited as having been used previously on the F.27, a large late variant of the F.20, both online and in Shavrov, History of Aircraft Construction (online excerpt); it is not listed in O. Thetford, British Naval Aircraft Since 1912, J.M. Bruce, The Aeroplanes of the Royal Flying Corps: Military Wing (London: Putnamm 1992), pp. 229-238, but is in J.J. Davilla and A.M. Soltan, French Aircraft of the First World War (Boulder, CA: Flying Machines Press), performance table.)

Available sources generally record a top speed of 136 km/h (85 mph; 73 kn), although a later version with uprated 160 hp engine known as the HF.30 bis raised performance to 140 km/h (87 mph; 76 kn); one source states a speed of 155 km/h (96 mph; 84 kn), associated with a lighter version of the airframe. In comparative tests in 1916, the version with the 150 hp (110 kW) engine proved to have superior performance to the Voisin 5 light bomber and Lebed XI scout, the other designs available for large-scale Russian production; the prototype Anatra DS was apparently faster, but that plane did not enter production until 1917. One reference suggests that the HF.30 could more-or-less match the manoeuvrability of the opposing Fokker Eindecker, albeit perhaps at the very limit of its own flight envelope.

In addition to these reasonably straightforward variants, the seaplane-skiplane hybrid known as the ShCh M-16 Zimnyak is also identified as a heavily modified subtype of the HF.30. (Note: The identification of the M.16 as a Farman 30 variant is from T. Heinonen, Thulinista Hornetiin – 75 vuotta Suomen ilmavoimien lentokoneita (Tikkakoski: Central Finland Aviation Museum, 1992), p. 38. The direct debt is not mentioned in the descriptions excerpted at flyingmachines.ru.) Designed by D.P. Grigorovich, this retained only the 150 hp (110 kW) Salmson and the basic layout of the HF.30, with a modified cockpit, shorter tail and staggered wings of equal length, plus a specialized undercarriage.

== Operational history ==
At the start of the First World War the Farman type pusher biplane was widely regarded as the best available design for a combat aircraft. The unencumbered position of the cockpit provided a very wide field of fire for a forward-facing gun, not to mention a good view ahead and to the sides for piloting, aerial reconnaissance and artillery spotting. The greater lift of a biplane design enabled the plane to carry a heavier cargo, such as a payload of bombs under the wings. The relatively simple airframe was also seen as suitable for mass production, especially before synchronization gear became widely available, these criteria were enough to outweigh the superior speed and flight performance offered by monoplane designs with a tractor propeller.

Other contemporary Allied warplanes, such as the French Breguet Bre.5 and the British F.E.2, DH.1 and D.H.2, used the Farman pusher layout.

Unusually the HF.30 was used exclusively by the Imperial Russian Air Service, and serial production appears to have taken place principally or entirely in Russia. The Air Service was already using Farman type aircraft extensively, and had substantial experience of manufacturing them under license. At an early stage, there had been talk of making the MF.11 the Air Service's primary plane, and in 1913 a HF.15 had been their first armed fighter. Details on how and when the HF.30 was procured seem sketchy, with vaguely indicated dates for its front-line deployment ranging from late 1915 to late 1916. The new type was known as the Farman Tridtsat' (Фарман тридцать, "Farman Thirty", often written Фарман-XXX) and was nicknamed the "Fartri", or sometimes the "Farsal" (Фарсаль) from its Salomon engine.

The HF.30 appears to have been produced principally by the Dux Factory in Moscow, although some level of construction seems to have also taken place at several of the other major Russian aircraft factories. With over 400 planes built at Dux alone, it far outnumbered the Lebed and Anatra designs or the limited numbers of fighters assembled from imported components, although the situation is less clear with the Voisin V. Alongside the HF.30, limited numbers of both the F.27 and the F.40 bomber were also procured.

In spite of its apparent ubiquity, there is little detailed information available about the combat role of the HF.30. As an Imperial military doctrine for the use of aircraft developed in 1914, armed Farman type biplanes (and a few Sikorsky S-12s) were designated for important fortress garrisons and each numbered army's headquarters, with unarmed monoplanes serving as high-speed scouts for front-line army corps, but by the outbreak of hostilities, this distinction seems to have been abandoned: for example, the squadron attached to 1 Corps flew the F.22, an immediate precursor of the HF.30.

There are sketchy references to the type's involvement in air combat, but it is not clear how far the HF.30 had been deployed before two consecutive developments in 1916 that curtailed its usefulness. Firstly, the Air Service began to restrict the air superiority role to new high-performance planes equipped with synchronization gears, like the imported Nieuport 11; then, the HF.30 was definitively outclassed in combat by new opponents, beginning with the Albatros D.I fighter and the Albatros C.V scout. Furthermore, the HF.30's "pusher" engine came to be regarded as a large, exposed target for attackers from the rear.

Nonetheless, a large production run and relatively good performance ensured that the HF.30 saw wide use. It flew in a battlefield reconnaissance role, including photo reconnaissance, and probably on bombing raids in early Soviet squadrons in 1918. At least some individual planes were still assigned to fighter units, presumably to provide them with a reconnaissance and liaison capability: in late 1917, the 19th Fighter Squadron used a single HF.30 alongside its five up-to-date Nieuports. A measure of its relative capability can be gauged from the fact that the HF.30 was the only warplane design with a large-scale production line which was not mentioned when the First All-Russia Aviation Congress demanded an end to the manufacture of obsolescent planes in August 1917. (Note: The list included the Anatra D, Lebed XII, Voisin-Ivanov and F.27 (www.airwar.ru)) The type was used by both sides in the Russian Civil War, and continued in production under the Red government. The Berdyansk factory was still producing planes in 1919.

There were 147 HF.30s in the Soviet inventory in 1921, still in the front-line reconnaissance role; shortly afterwards it was decided to reassign them to a training role, but in 1922 there were still five front-line squadrons with 63 planes and just eight trainers. By 1924, there remained at least nine trainers and eight planes in front-line service. Subsequently, at least ten were transferred to the new civil aviation organization, where they were apparently used to for "propaganda and recruitment" across the Soviet Union: some continued to fly until the end of the 1920s.

The wide availability of the type also meant that it was acquired by other emerging states of Eastern Europe. In late 1917, a report for the nascent Ukrainian People's Army Air Force reported an inventory of 22 aircraft in the territory controlled by the Central Rada, while two more examples were serving with the ex-Imperial units that became the founding squadrons of the Polish Air Force, and a further seven were captured by them subsequently. In 1918 an L.30 became one of the first two planes of the nascent Czech Air Force, with at least one more acquired soon after while six of the M-16 snowplane/seaplane variant were acquired by the Finnish Air Force and served until 1923. In 1919, a captured example became the first plane of the Estonian Air Force.

== Variants ==
HF.30
2-seat reconnaissance biplane.
HF.30bis
2-seat reconnaissance biplane, powered by a 160 hp (120 kW) Salmson P9 engine, distinguished by an exhaust manifold directing exhaust upwards, rather than individual exhaust pipes.

== Operators ==
Russia

- Imperial Russian Air Service - Over 400 built

Soviet Union

- Soviet Air Force - 147 planes in service in 1921; at least 50 built new, others taken over from the Imperial Russian Air Service.
- Dobrolyot - at least 10 planes transferred for civil aviation purposes.

Ukraine

- Ukrainian People's Army - 20 planes in inventory in late 1917.

Makhnovshchina

- Air Fleet of the Revolutionary Insurgent Army of Ukraine

Poland

- Polish Air Force- At least 9 planes acquired in 1917-20.

Czechoslovakia

- Czechoslovak Army Air Force - At least 2 planes acquired in 1918.

Finland

- Finnish Air Force - 6 Grigorovich M-16 seaplane/skiplane derivatives acquired in 1918.

Estonia

- Estonian Air Force - 1 plane acquired in 1919.

== Specifications (HF.30 Canton-Unné CU X-9) ==
(Note: Shavrov gives a wing area of 50m², while Liron cites a longer fuselage of 10.66, but a lighter weight of 700 kg empty and 1050 kg loaded, and a correspondingly faster top speed of 155 km/h. There is no consensus over the plane's range, with Davilla claiming 450 km, Shavrov 510 km, and Andersson 540 km. The maximum speed has been given as 136 km/h (approx. 73 knots, 85 mph) - author got his knickers in a pickle mixing up the specs of the HF.30 with those of the F.30)

Data from Aviafrance:HF-30, French aircraft of the First World War

General characteristics

- Crew: 2 (pilot & gunner)
- Length: 15.8 m (51 ft 10 in)
- Wingspan: 15.8 m (51 ft 10 in)
- Height: 3.2 m (10 ft 6 in)
- Wing area: 49 m^{2} (530 sq ft)
- Empty weight: 700 kg (1,543 lb)
- Gross weight: 1,050 kg (2,315 lb)
- Powerplant: 1 × Canton Unné X-9 9-cylinder water-cooled radial engine, 120 kW (160 hp)
- Propellers: 2-bladed fixed-pitch wooden pusher propeller

Performance

- Maximum speed: 155 km/h (96 mph, 84 kn)
- Endurance: 4 hours
- Service ceiling: 4,500 m (14,800 ft)
- Time to altitude: 2,000 m (6,600 ft) in 9 minutes

Armament

- Guns: 1x 7.62mm machine gun (Colt, Maxim or Hotchkiss)
- Bombs: up to 100 kg (220 lb) of bombs or flechettes

== See also ==
=== Related development ===
- Farman HF.20
- Farman F.40
- Farman HF.30

=== Aircraft of comparable role, configuration and era ===
- Breguet Bre.5
- Royal Aircraft Factory F.E.2
- D.H. 2

== Bibliography ==
- Gerdessen, Frederik. "Estonian Air Power 1918 – 1945". Air Enthusiast, No. 18, April – July 1982. pp. 61–76. ISSN 0143-5450.
- Liron, Jean (1984). Les avions Farman. Collection Docavia. Vol. 21. Paris: Éditions Larivière. OCLC 37146471.
