= Anatra DE =

General information
- Type: Medium bomber
- National origin: Russian Empire
- Manufacturer: Anatra
- Number built: 1

History
- First flight: June 23, 1916
- Developed from: Anatra D

The Anatra DE was a three-engined prototype Russian medium bomber of World War I. The biplane bomber was designed to hold four people. It was planned to use three engines to reach its target, then return using only one engine, having been lightened after dropping its payload. There was a single 140 hp Salmson engine at the front of the fuselage, and an 80 hp Le Rhône engine on each wing, which turned propellers attached to the rear of the engine, behind the wing. These engines were placed in a pusher configuration, and each wing also had a gun turret one each engine nacelle. In total, the aircraft had three guns, and could carry 400 kg of bombs. The only prototype that was built, weighing 327 kg more than expected, first flew on June 23, 1916. During testing, however, the fuselage and rear propellers became damaged when a tail skid broke, and it became evident that the design needed to be changed; the project was then abandoned.

== Specifications ==
General characteristics

- Crew: 1 pilot, 3 gunmen
- Length: 9 m (29 ft 6 in)
- Wingspan: 16 m (52 ft 6 in)
- Empty weight: 1,527 kg (3,366 lb)
- Gross weight: 2,347 kg (5,174 lb)
- Powerplant: 1 × Salmson-(Canton-Unne) 9Z radial engine, 100 kW (140 hp)
- Powerplant: 2 × Le Rhône 9C rotary engines, 60 kW (80 hp) each

Armament

- Guns: 3×machine guns
- Bombs: 400kg
