= Sikorsky S-20 =

Type of aircraft

RBVZ S-XX
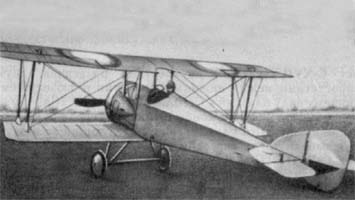

General information
- Type: Fighter
- Manufacturer: RBVZ (Russo-Baltic Wagon Works)
- Designer: Igor Sikorsky
- Primary user: Imperial Russian Air Service
- Number built: 5

History
- Introduction date: 1916
- First flight: 1916
- Retired: 1920

The Sikorsky S-20 (named after its designer) or RBVZ S-XX (named after its manufacturer) was a Russian single-bay unequal span two-seat biplane designed by Igor Sikorsky in 1916. Displaying some Nieuport influence, it saw very little service during World War I.

Five S-XX aircraft were built in September 1916, with the first two powered by the 100 hp Gnome rotary engine which had powered its predecessor, the RBVZ S-XVI. However, the other three were powered with the 120 hp Le Rhone engine, with which they were allegedly faster than the French Nieuport 17.

== Operational history ==
The S-XX saw little service because it was viewed as inferior to newer enemy aircraft, and no series production was undertaken. As such, only five aircraft were ever produced.

== List of operators ==
Russian Empire

- Imperial Russian Air Service

== Specifications ==
General characteristics

- Length: 6.5 m (21 ft 4 in)
- Wingspan: 8.6 m (28 ft 3 in)
- Height: 2.6 m (8 ft 6 in)
- Wing area: 17 m^{2} (180 sq ft)
- Empty weight: 395 kg (871 lb)
- Gross weight: 570 kg (1,257 lb)
- Powerplant: 1 × Le Rhône Type 9Jb 9-cylinder air-cooled rotary piston engine, 89 kW (120 hp)
- Propellers: 2-bladed fixed-pitch propeller

Performance

- Maximum speed: 180 km/h (110 mph, 97 kn)
- Range: 390 km (240 mi, 210 nmi)
- Service ceiling: 5,600 m (18,400 ft)
- Time to altitude: 2,000 m (6,600 ft) in 6 minutes 20 seconds
- Wing loading: 33.0 kg/m^{2} (6.8 lb/sq ft)
- Power/mass: 0.21 hp/kg

Armament

- Guns: 1 x 7.7 mm Lavrov machine gun
