= Ukrainian People's Republic Air Fleet =

Air Force of the Ukrainian People's Republic (1917-21)

- Active: 1917 to 1921
- Disbanded: 1921
- Country: Ukrainian People's Republic
- Role: Air Force
- Engagements: Ukrainian War of Independence

Commanders
- Notable commanders: Viktor Pavlenko

Insignia
- Roundel

The Ukrainian People's Republic Air Fleet was the air force of the Ukrainian People's Republic from 1917–1921.

== Aircraft ==
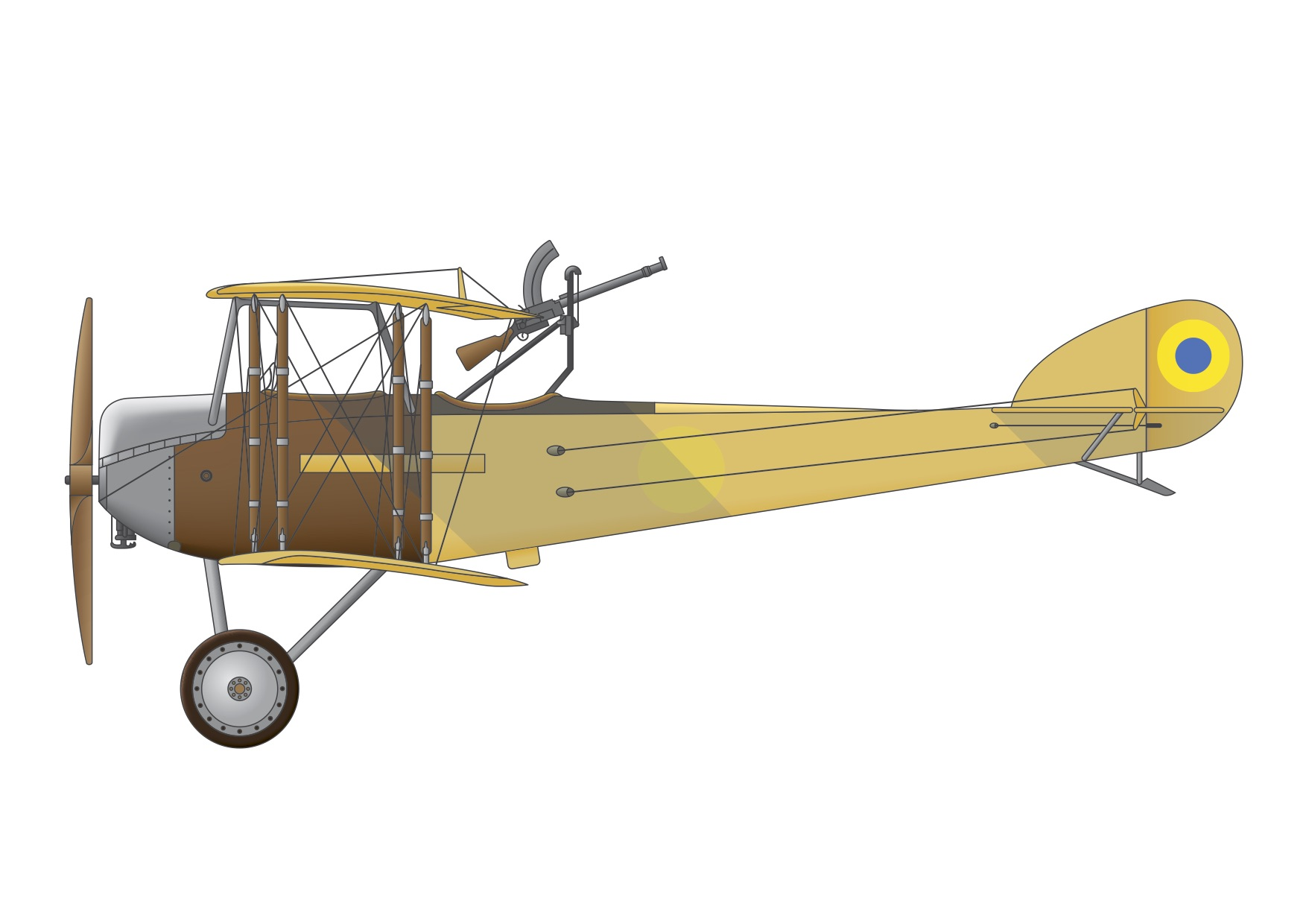
Anatra Anade. Post-Volynski airfield, Kiev, March-April 1918.

=== Fighters ===
- Morane-Saulnier Type Nm (3)
- Sikorsky S-16
- Nieuport 11 C.1 Bebe
- Nieuport 17 (3)
- Nieuport 21 (2)
- Nieuport 23 (7)
- Nieuport 27
- SPAD S.VII (2)
- Sopwith Camel F.1
- Sopwith 1½ Strutter (1)
- Vickers FB.19 Bullet
- Fokker D.VII
- Sopwith Dolphin

=== Reconnaissance ===
- Anatra D Anade
- Anatra DSS Anasal
- Lloyd C.V

=== Bombers ===
- Voisin III LA S (6)
- Maurice Farman MF.11 Shorthorn (1)
- Zeppelin-Staaken R.XIVa (1)
- Sikorsky Ilja Muromets S-14 G-1

== See also ==
- Air Fleet of the Revolutionary Insurgent Army of Ukraine
- Ukrainian People's Army
- Ukrainian Galician Army
