= Anatra DM Anamon =

WWI Russian prototype fighter aircraft

Anamon

General information
- Type: Fighter
- Manufacturer: Anatra
- Designer: Elysée Alfred Descamps
- Number built: 1

History
- First flight: 16 June 1916

The Anatra Anamon was a Russian prototype monoplane fighter built by the A.A. Anatra factory in World War I.

== Design ==
The Anamon was a single-seat monoplane fighter of slim plywood fuselage and mid-placed trapezoid wing with cut out viewing aperture. The landing gear was similar to that designed for the Anatra D.

Test flights of the Anatra Anamon began June 16, 1916, but pilots complained about the 'long' (150m) takeoff and landing Roll as well as steep gliding. The deep pilot's position also was not appreciated. Improvements were suggested, but after minor damage such plans were axed.

== Specifications ==
Data from

General characteristics

- Crew: one
- Length: 6.34 m (20 ft 10 in)
- Wingspan: 8.6 m (28 ft 3 in)
- Wing area: 14.0 m^{2} (151 sq ft)
- Empty weight: 360 kg (794 lb)
- Gross weight: 535 kg (1,179 lb)
- Powerplant: 1 × Gnome Monosoupape , 75 kW (100 hp)

Performance

- Maximum speed: 158 km/h (98 mph, 85 kn)
- Endurance: 2.5 hours
- Service ceiling: 4,500 m (14,800 ft)
- Rate of climb: 22 m/s (4,300 ft/min)

Armament

- 1 machine gun
