= Anatra =

Defunct Russian-Ukrainian aircraft manufacturer

- Industry: Aeronautics, defence
- Founded: 1909
- Founder: Artur Antonovich Anatra
- Defunct: 1922
- Fate: factory closed
- Successor: none
- Headquarters: Odessa, Russian Empire
- Number of locations: 2
- Key people: Alfred Descamps, Vassili Nikolayevich Khioni
- Products: Aircraft

Anatra (Анатра) was an aircraft manufacturer founded by Artur Antonovich Anatra (Артур Антонович Анатра) at Odessa in the Russian Empire (now Ukraine) in 1913 which manufactured aircraft until 1917. Artur Anatra had previously helped fund the purchase of the first aircraft to arrive in the Russian Empire, in 1909.

The factory began as a naval workshop producing foreign designs, and they constructed approximately twenty aircraft from 1909 through 1912. Anatra licensed designs by Farman, Morane-Saulnier, Nieuport, and Voisin, ultimately building at a rate of as many as sixty per month by 1917. They also manufactured their own designs for the Russian army during World War I. Both of its factories were taken over and operated by the Soviets, until eventually being closed in 1922, after having produced 1056 aircraft in Odessa, and 50 at a second location they had opened 500 km (310 mi) away, in Simferopol, in Crimea.

== Aircraft ==
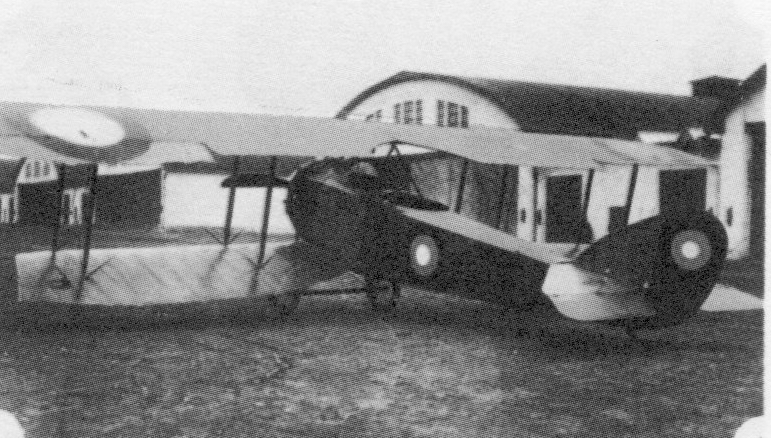
Anatra DS Anasal

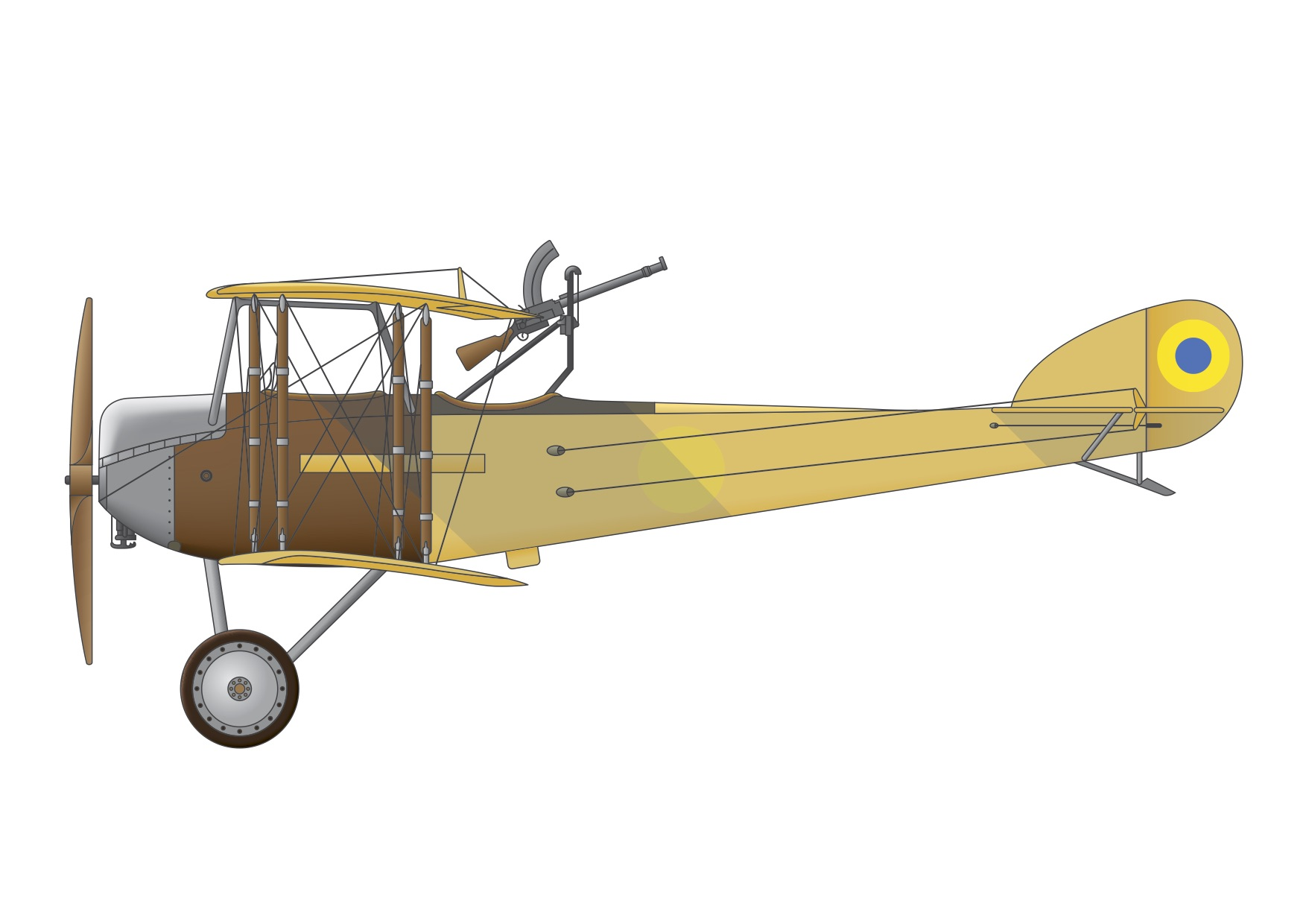
Anatra Anade, Kyiv, March–April 1918. Ukrainian People's Republic Air Fleet.

Anatra started by producing foreign designs under license including the Farman III, Nieuport IV, Morane-Saulnier L, and Voisin V. The latter became the most significant of these, forming the basis for the Anatra V.I. (short for Voisin-Ivanovich) which flew in April 1916.

By then, their head designer, Frenchman Alfred Descamps, and who had previously worked for Aviatik before the outbreak of World War One, had completed development of the D Anade (D for Descamos, and Anade being short for Anatra-Descamps), commonly called the Dekan, following the Russian pronunciation of his surname, which would be the most numerous aircraft produced by Anatra. After an extended development period in which the crew had to be moved forward, and the wing moved aft and given substantial sweepback to correct balance problems, it saw service as a reconnaissance aircraft with the Imperial Russian Air Force (IRAS) and would be further developed. Due to shortages of good quality lumber, the factory scarfed shorter pieces together poorly, compromising its structural integrity, and giving Anatra a poor reputation with the IRAS.

Variants included the Anakle (short for Anade-Clerget), which was basically the same but powered by a 82 kW (110 hp) Clerget 9Z rotary engine installed under a horseshow cowling, which resulted in a modest performance improvement, and the DS Anasal (short for Anade Salmson), powered with a 110 kW (150 hp) water-cooled Salmson 9R radial, which necessitated a redesign of the fuselage to handle the extra power so that the fabric covered rear fuselage was now covered in plywood, and it had the visible addition of a radiator for the engine. The DSS or Anasal SS followed and was similar to the DS, but with a slightly more powerful 120 kW (160 hp) Salmson radial, but few were built. All of these were reconnaissance aircraft.

Anatra also developed two fighters. The first was the DM or Anamon single-seat monoplane with a wooden monocoque fuselage (that might have inspired its name) that resembled the pre-war Deperdussin TT. Armament was a single Vickers machine gun with deflector plates on the propellers instead of an interrupter gear, and power was provided by a 75 kW (100 hp) Gnome Monosoupape rotary engine. This aircraft was heavily criticized, and development ended following the crash of the single prototype shortly after its first flight on 16 June 1916.

The second fighter, the Anadis (short for Anade istrebitel, Russian for fighter) used Anasal flying surfaces with a new moulded wooden monocoque fuselage and was powered with a 110 kW (150 hp) Hispano-Suiza 8A engine and provided with enough fuel for 14 hours of flying time. The single example was completed as a two-seater and it first flew on 23 October 1916, and on a later flight to Western Europe it was lost in a forced landing in Romania.

The DE trimotor bomber was built with a single 100 kW (140 hp) Salmson 9B radial engine in the nose, and two 60 kW (80 hp) Le Rhone 9C rotary engines mounted as pushers, with the propellers behind the engines, and it carried four crew members, two of which manned guns at the front of the engine nacelles. A 400 kg (880 lb) bombload was intended, but the aircraft was 320 kg (700 lb) overweight and development was abandoned after the sole prototype was damaged during its first flight, on 23 June 1916.

Vassili Nikolayevich Khioni, a designer with Anatra, was responsible for the Anadva (short for Anade 2, and nicknamed Двухвостка, Russian for twin-tailed.) with twin fuselages, which carried a gunner in a pod on the top wing, above and between the two fuselages. The fuselages used were those of the Anade (the VKh Anadva) and the Anasal (Anadva-Salmson), but neither design was successful despite work continuing into 1921.

Aircraft built by Anatra
Designation/Name	First flight	Number built	Type	Engine(s)
D Anade	19 December 1915	170	Reconnaissance	75 kW (100 hp) Gnome Monosoupape
Anakle/Anakler	1916	24	Reconnaissance	82 kW (110 hp) Clerget 9Z
VI/Voisin-Ivanovich	6 April 1916	139	Reconnaissance	110 kW (150 hp) Salmson 9R
DM Anamon	16 June 1916	1	Fighter	75 kW (100 hp) Gnome Monosoupape
DE	23 June 1916	1	Bomber	1 x 100 kW (140 hp) Salmson 9B & 2 x 60 kW (80 hp) Le Rhone 9Cs
DS Anasal	25 July 1916	70+	Reconnaissance	110 kW (150 hp) Salmson 9R
VKh Anadva	July 1916	1	Bomber	75 kW (100 hp) Gnome Monosoupape
Anadis	23 October 1916	1	Fighter	110 kW (150 hp) Hispano-Suiza 8A
DSS or Anasal SS	February 1917	few	Reconnaissance	120 kW (160 hp) Salmson 9R
Anadva-Salmson	May 1917	1	Bomber	110 kW (150 hp) Salmson 9R
