= Hering & Richard =

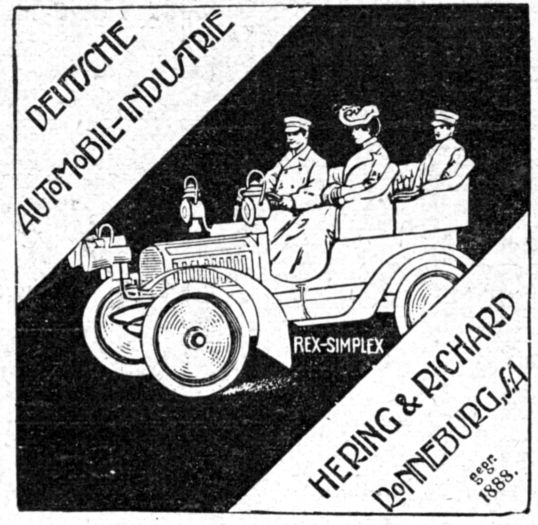
Rex-Simplex (from a period advertisement)

The Deutsche Automobil-Industrie Hering & Richard was a German company which produced motor vehicles in its factory in Gera-Untermhaus. From 1904 the company headquarters was in Ronneburg (Thuringia). Models were produced under the brand names Rex and Rex-Simplex between 1901 and 1923, using engines from De Dion-Bouton and/or Fafnir. Rex-Simplex models were produced under licence elsewhere, e.g. by Russo-Balt.

== History ==
The company was founded in 1902 as the company Deutsche Automobil-Industrie Friedrich Hering. As early as 1888, Friedrich Hering had already operated a supplier of bicycle and auto parts as well as axles and chassis frames. Hering began producing voiturettes under licence from De Dion-Bouton. Ball bearing axles were produced for Daimler-Motoren-Gesellschaft and Benz & Cie., and steel disc wheels with removable hard rubber tires for Michelin, which were still built in large numbers in the new plant.

The company, with approximately 300 employees, immediately became known in 1902 in the automotive and commercial vehicle industry, because it produced a particularly modern solidly built light truck under the brand "Rex-Simplex". With modifications this was also built as a robust passenger car. This light commercial vehicle was one of the best-known trucks until the First World War.

In 1904, the entrepreneur Carl Richard, who owned a factory in Ronneburg, became a new shareholder. The company now traded as Hering & Richard.

In 1913, the wheel department of Hering was spun off, which was very successful until (and after) the Second World War. During the First World War, the standard 3-ton truck was made by about 600 employees. After the war, the three-tonner was further developed; in this form the Rex simplex has been exported all over the world. Nevertheless, Hering and Richard did not manage to raise the necessary capital to survive on their own: in 1922, the factory was taken over by Elite-Werke AG in Brand-Erbisdorf. The bodywork factory at Ronneburg was spun off. The German automobile company of Hering & Richard and the brand Rex Simplex ceased to trade.

== Company names ==
(1901 - 1904); Deutsche Automobil-Industrie Friedrich Hering; Ronneburg; Germany

(1904 - 1908); Deutsche Automobil-Industrie Hering & Richard; Ronneburg; Germany

(1908 - 1921); Automobilwerk Richard & Hering; Ronneburg; Germany

(1921 - 1923); Elitewagen AG; Ronneburg; Germany

The wheel-making part of the company continues to the present day.

== Literature ==
- Die Geschichte des deutschen LKW-Baus. Band 1 (The history of German truck construction. part 1), Weltbild Verlag, 1994, ISBN 3-89350-811-2, Pages 57–59.
