= Air Fleet of the Revolutionary Insurgent Army of Ukraine =

Air force of the Revolutionary Insurrectionary Army of Ukraine (1918-21)

Revolutionary Insurgent Air Force of Ukraine
- Воздушный флот Революционной повстанческой армии Украины
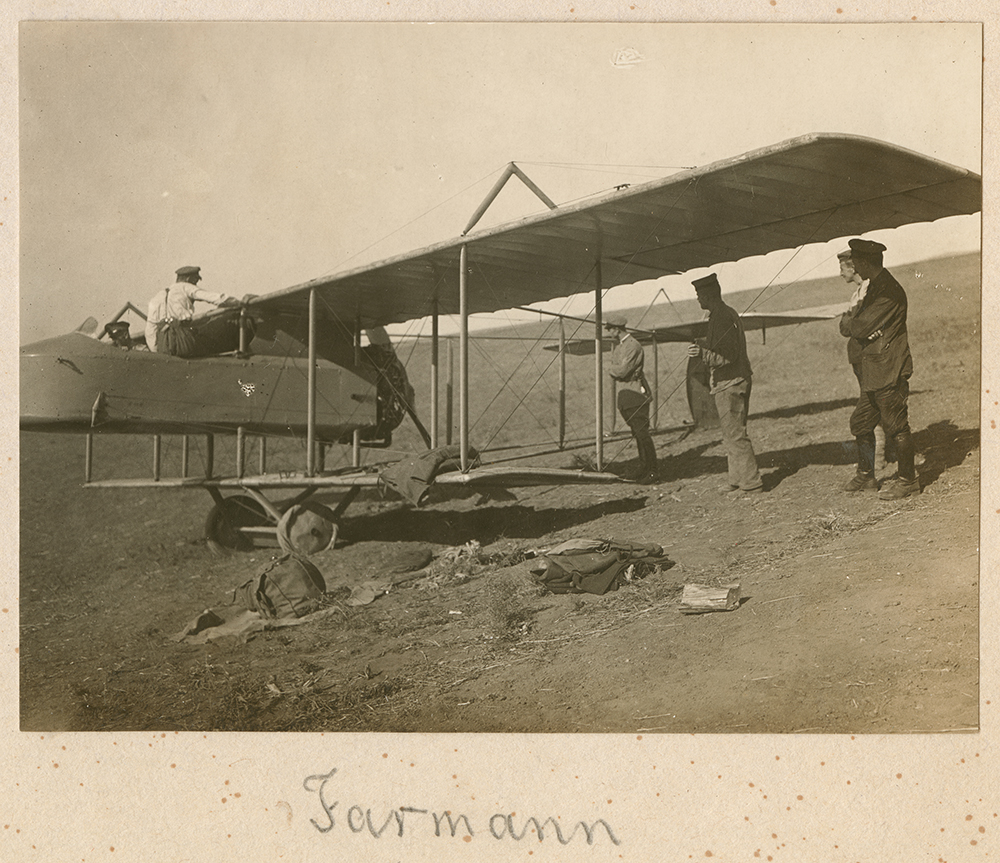
- Photo of a Farman HF.30. Aircraft of this type were used by Makhnovist forces.
- Active: December 27, 1918–1921
- Country: Ukraine
- Allegiance: Makhnovshchina
- Branch: Revolutionary Insurgent Army of Ukraine
- Type: Air force
- Role: Aerial warfare
- Engagements: Ukrainian War of Independence

The Air Fleet of the Revolutionary Insurgent Army of Ukraine was one of the branches of the anarchist Revolutionary Insurgent Army of Ukraine during the Ukrainian War of Independence.

== History ==
The history of the air force in the Makhnovist movement began in the city of Yekaterinoslav. On December 27, 1918, the Revolutionary Insurgent Army of Ukraine, led by Nestor Makhno, occupied Yekaterinoslav. There, the rebels seized 7 airplanes from the Ukrainian People's Republic Air Fleet. Makhno hoped to take the airplanes out of the city, but because of a dispute with the Bolsheviks about their distribution and the offensive of the Ukrainian People's Army, the rebels were forced to leave the airplanes in the city and retreat.

In January 1919, the Makhnovists signed an agreement with the Soviet government; the rebels entered the newly created 3rd Brigade of the 1st Zadneprovsk Division of the Red Army. The 22nd Squadron of the Red Army was assigned to the division, which provided air support to the Makhnovists on Sopwith triplanes during combat operations.

In March 1919, a military pilot named Ionin and an observer named Bulgakov flew to Huliaipole to carry out military operations in cooperation with the 3rd Zadneprovskaya Brigade. Ionin made reconnaissance missions and bombed various infrastructure facilities of the Volunteer Army. On March 15, the Makhnovists occupied Berdyansk, where they seized five Farman HF.30 aircraft. On March 17, Makhno, in a telegram to the headquarters of the 1st Zadneprovsk Division, asked to send mechanics and pilots to Berdyansk for the captured aircraft. Soon a pilot and a mechanic arrived in the city and repaired one of the planes, which aided in the Makhnovists' capture of Mariupol on March 28-29, 1919. At the end of March 1919, Pavel Dybenko arrived in Berdyansk, and he officially transferred the plane to the 3rd Zadneprovsk Division for personal use. Makhno flew on this plane from Berdyansk to Gulyaypole.

Starting from May 13, 1919, there was one airplane in service with the 2nd Brigade of the Zadneprovskaya division. In the summer of 1919, information about the aircraft disappears.

On October 29, 1920, the Crimean RIAU group seized 4 airplanes in Melitopol.

== In literature ==
The theme of the air force in the Makhnovist movement is found in the science fiction novel by the English writer Michael Moorcock. His novel The Steel Tsar describes an alternative reality in which there was no October Revolution, and the Makhnovists created an air military detachment from the airships captured from the Kerensky government. Having united with the rebels of I. Dzhugashvili, Nestor Makhno's units, which include a military detachment of airships, storm the city of Yekaterinoslav.

== Bibliography ==
- Chop, Volodimir (2019). The aviation of the Makhno movement (1918–1920). Zaporizhzhia Historical Review. Vol. 1. Zaporizhia National Technical University. pp. 88–95. doi:10.26661/zhv-2019-1-53-12. S2CID 213596279.
- Belash, Alexander; Belash, Victor (1993). Дороги Нестора Махно (in Russian). Kiev: RVC "Proza".
