= Sikorsky S-11 =

S-11
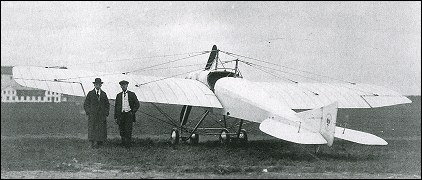
- Sikorsky S-11 circa 1913

General information
- Type: Reconnaissance
- National origin: Russian Empire
- Manufacturer: Russian Baltic Railroad Car Works
- Designer: Igor Sikorsky
- Number built: 1

History
- First flight: 1913
- Developed from: S-7

The Sikorsky S-11 Polukroogly (Half Round) was a Russian single engine prototype reconnaissance aircraft completed in July 1913 by the Russian Baltic Railroad Car Works while Igor Sikorsky was the chief engineer of the aircraft manufacturing division.

== Design and development ==
The S-11 was a two seat mid-wing monoplane with wire-braced wings powered by a Gnome Monosoupape air-cooled rotary engine rated at 100 hp (75 kW). It was smaller and lighter than the S-9 on which it was based, and had a conventional wooden fuselage. The cockpit featured side-by-side seating with controls for the pilot only on the left. Originally built with ailerons controlled by steel tubes inside the wings, it was later redesigned using wing warping for roll control.

== Operational history ==
Initial flight tests showed good performance from the wing design with a short take-off run of 75 metres (246 ft) and low stall speed. Further tests revealed limited roll authority leading to the change from ailerons to wing warping. The S-11 won second place in a reconnaissance aircraft competition hosted by the Russian military in 1913, but no orders were ever placed for additional examples.

== Specifications ==
Data from Russian Aviation Museum

General characteristics

- Crew: Two
- Length: 24 ft 11 in (7.6 m)
- Wingspan: 38 ft 1 in (11.6 m)
- Wing area: 280 sq ft (26 m^{2})
- Empty weight: 1,274 lb (578 kg)
- Gross weight: 2,216 lb (1,005 kg)
- Powerplant: 1 × Gnome Monosoupape 7-cylinder air-cooled rotary piston engine, 100 hp (75 kW)
- Propellers: 2-bladed

Performance

- Maximum speed: 63 mph (102 km/h, 55 kn)
- Stall speed: 43 mph (70 km/h, 38 kn)
- Wing loading: 7.9 lb/sq ft (38.6 kg/m^{2}) max load
