= Sikorsky S-9 =

S-9
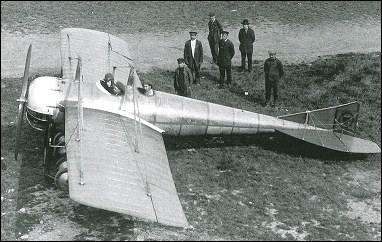
- Sikorsky S-9 circa 1913

General information
- Type: Experimental Monoplane
- National origin: Russian Empire
- Manufacturer: Russian Baltic Railroad Car Works
- Designer: Igor Sikorsky
- Number built: 1

History
- First flight: 1913

The Sikorsky S-9 Kruglyj (Rounded One) was a Russian single engine prototype aircraft completed in the spring of 1913 by the Russian Baltic Railroad Car Works while Igor Sikorsky was the chief engineer of the aircraft manufacturing division.

== Design and development ==
The S-9 was a three-seat mid-wing monoplane with constant-chord wire-braced wings originally powered by a Gnome air-cooled rotary engine rated at 100 hp (75 kW). It was the first monocoque monoplane built in Russia and the cylindrical tapered fuselage was constructed of plywood 5 mm thick in the forward section and 3mm thick aft. Construction was completed in the spring of 1913.

== Operational history ==
Upon completion the S-9 was found to be substantially heavier than anticipated and the engine only delivered 80% of its rated horsepower. Initial flight tests revealed very poor performance. The engine was replaced by a 100 hp (75 kW) Gnome Monosoupape and further flights showed only a nominal increase in speed. The machine was eventually scrapped.

== Specifications ==
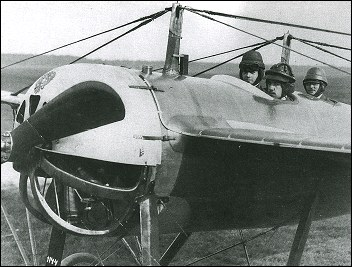
S-9 nose detail

Data from Russian Aviation Museum

General characteristics

- Crew: One
- Capacity: Two passenger
- Upper wingspan: 39 ft 4 in (12 m)
- Wing area: 320 sq ft (30 m^{2})
- Empty weight: 1,521 lb (690 kg)
- Gross weight: 2,183 lb (990 kg)
- Powerplant: 1 × Gnome Monosoupape 7-cylinder air-cooled rotary piston engine, 100 hp (75 kW)
- Propellers: 2-bladed

Performance

- Maximum speed: 56 mph (90 km/h, 49 kn)
- Wing loading: 6.8 lb/sq ft (33 kg/m^{2}) max load
