= Sikorsky S-12 =

S-12
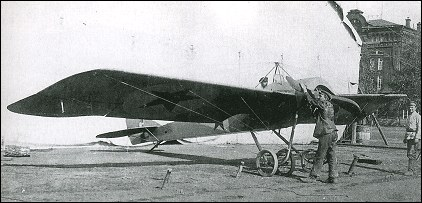
- Sikorsky S-12 circa 1913

General information
- Type: Trainer
- National origin: Russian Empire
- Manufacturer: Russian Baltic Railroad Car Works
- Designer: Igor Sikorsky
- Number built: 12

History
- First flight: 1913
- Developed from: S-11

The Sikorsky S-12 was a Russian single engine trainer aircraft completed in the spring of 1913 by the Russian Baltic Railroad Car Works while Igor Sikorsky was the chief engineer of the aircraft manufacturing division.

== Design and development ==
The S-12 was a single seat mid-wing monoplane with wire-braced wings and powered by a Gnome Lambda air-cooled rotary engine rated at 80 hp (60 kW). It was smaller and lighter than the S-11 on which it was based, and was specifically designed to be highly maneuverable.

== Operational history ==
The S-12 was the most successful monoplane Sikorsky designed during his time in Russia and twelve examples were produced. In September 1913 an S-12 became the first Russian aircraft to perform an inside loop at the Kolomyazhskiy hippodrome north of St. Petersburg. Later an S-12 set an altitude record of 3,680 metres (12,070 ft). During World War I and the Russian Revolution S-12s served with the Russian Air Force and some were still in service until 1922.

== Specifications ==
Data from Russian Aviation Museum

General characteristics

- Crew: One
- Wing area: 212 sq ft (19.7 m^{2})
- Empty weight: 924 lb (419 kg)
- Gross weight: 1,501 lb (681 kg)
- Powerplant: 1 × Gnome Lambda 7-cylinder air-cooled rotary piston engine, 80 hp (60 kW)
- Propellers: 2-bladed

Performance

- Service ceiling: 12,070 ft (3,680 m)
- Wing loading: 7.1 lb/sq ft (34.5 kg/m^{2}) max load
