= Anatra Anadis =

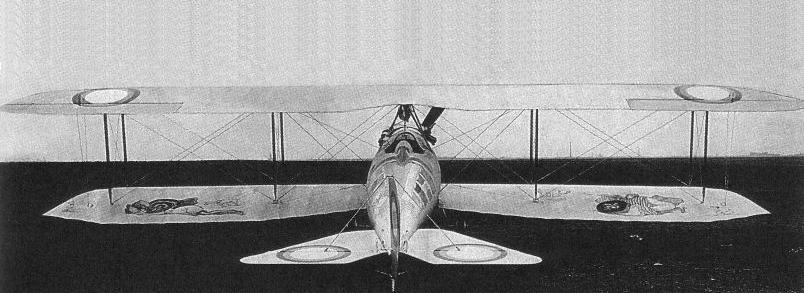

General information
- Type: Fighter
- National origin: Russian Empire
- Manufacturer: Anatra
- Designer: Elisee Alfred Descamps
- Number built: 1

History
- First flight: 23 October 1916
- Developed from: Anatra Anasal

The Anatra Anadis was developed in 1916 as a single-seat fighter variant of the Anatra Anasal reconnaissance biplane. The main difference between the two aircraft was the streamlined fuselage, the lack of a rear seat in the Anadis, plans for a forward-firing gun (not implemented) and a different engine.

== Development ==
In the spring of 1916, Elisee Alfred Descamps, a French designer and chief engineer of the Anatra company of Odessa was ordered to build a single-seat fighter based on the Anasal two-seat reconnaissance biplane. Retaining the Anasal's two-bay configuration and fabric-covered wooden construction, the fighter, dubbed the Anadis, differed in having a streamlined fuselage, the rear cockpit removed, provision made for forward-firing armament and the 150 hp Salmson water-cooled radial engine replaced by a similarly-rated Hispano-Suiza V8 water-cooled engine.

The prototype Anadis was flown on 23 October 1916 by the factory test pilot, another Frenchman, Jean Robinet. The test pilot and designer modified the fighter to recover the second seat and carry extra fuel tanks, the idea being to use it to escape Russia in the event of the impending revolution. Their plan was discovered by one Lieutenant Kononenko, an Imperial Army acceptance pilot attached to Anatra, and the modifications were reverted. Testing continued until 11 November 1916, the official report to the Imperial Army stating that it was "... not inferior to any German aircraft of the same type and with greater power".

Nevertheless, no further examples were ordered and the tested aircraft remained at the factory until the autumn of 1917. In September 1917, Staff Captain N.A. Makarov applied for permission to fly the aircraft on a long-distance propaganda flight along the route Odessa-Thessaloniki-Rome-Marseille-Paris with a subsequent return to Russia in order "to visit the fronts and factories, to see the Allied aviation... so that the Allies would supply us better". The flight was authorized. On 14 October, the Anadis was tested with a load of 500 kg. Interestingly, in addition to the identifying Russian cockades, the Anadis was painted very picturesquely: a two-headed eagle with the flags of the Entente countries were drawn on the fuselage and half-naked girls on the wings.

In November 1917, Makarov went on the flight, but he crashed near the city of Iași in Romania due to an engine failure. The subsequent history of the aircraft is unknown.

== Specifications ==
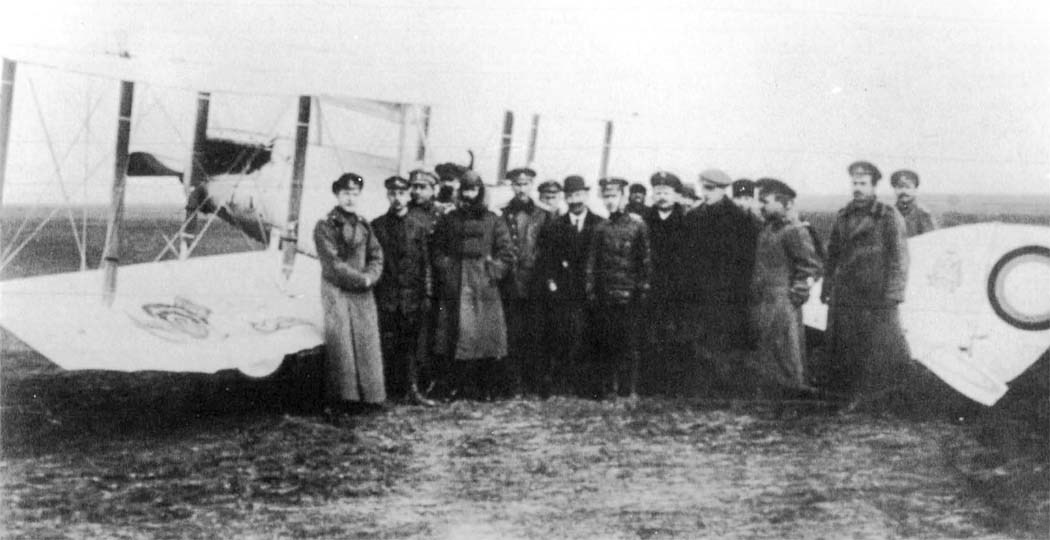
The Anatra Anadis with group of factory officials and officers of the Imperial Russian Air Service

Data from The Complete Book of Fighters

General characteristics

- Crew: 1
- Capacity: 500 kg (1,102 lb) payload
- Length: 7.75 m (25 ft 5 in)
- Wingspan: 11.4 m (37 ft 5 in)
- Wing area: 37 m^{2} (400 sq ft)
- Empty weight: 665 kg (1,466 lb)
- Gross weight: 1,165 kg (2,568 lb)
- Powerplant: 1 × Hispano-Suiza 8A V-8 water--cooled piston engine, 110 kW (150 hp)
- Propellers: 2-bladed fixed-pitch propeller

Performance

- Maximum speed: 153 km/h (95 mph, 83 kn)
- Rate of climb: 2.22 m/s (437 ft/min)
- Wing loading: 29.7 kg/m^{2} (6.1 lb/sq ft)
- Power/mass: 0.13 hp/kg
