= Anatra V.I. =

V.I.

General information
- Type: Reconnaissance aircraft
- Manufacturer: Anatra
- Designer: Piotr Ivanov
- Number built: 139

History
- First flight: 1916

The Anatra V.I. (for Voisin-Ivanov, not the Roman numeral VI) was a Russian reconnaissance aircraft of World War I. It was a redesign of the French Voisin III undertaken by Podporuchik Piotr Ivanov in Zhmerynka. The Voisin's fuselage pod was replaced by a streamlined, plywood construction that included an all-new mount for the observer's machine gun and an aluminium firewall between the pilot's cockpit and the aircraft's fuel tank. The wings and landing gear were strengthened as well. Despite the machine's greater weight, it was 20 km/h (12 mph) faster in the air than the Voisin that it was based on, and was quickly ordered into production. In practice, however, the aircraft that reached operational units were poorly built and therefore disliked by their crews.

== Operators ==
Russia

- Imperial Russian Air Force

Soviet Union

- Soviet Air Force - Taken over from the Imperial Russian Air Force.

== Specifications (variant) ==
General characteristics

- Crew: two, pilot and observer
- Length: 9.5 m (31 ft 2 in)
- Wingspan: 14.7 m (48 ft 3 in)
- Wing area: 39.0 m^{2} (420 sq ft)
- Empty weight: 852 kg (1,878 lb)
- Gross weight: 1,202 kg (2,650 lb)
- Powerplant: 1 × Salmson , 112 kW (150 hp)

Performance

- Maximum speed: 125 km/h (78 mph, 68 kn)
- Service ceiling: 3,500 m (11,500 ft)
- Rate of climb: 2.0 m/s (390 ft/min)

Armament

- 1 × machine gun in ring mount for observer
