= Russo-Balt =

Former Russian automotive and aircraft manufacturer

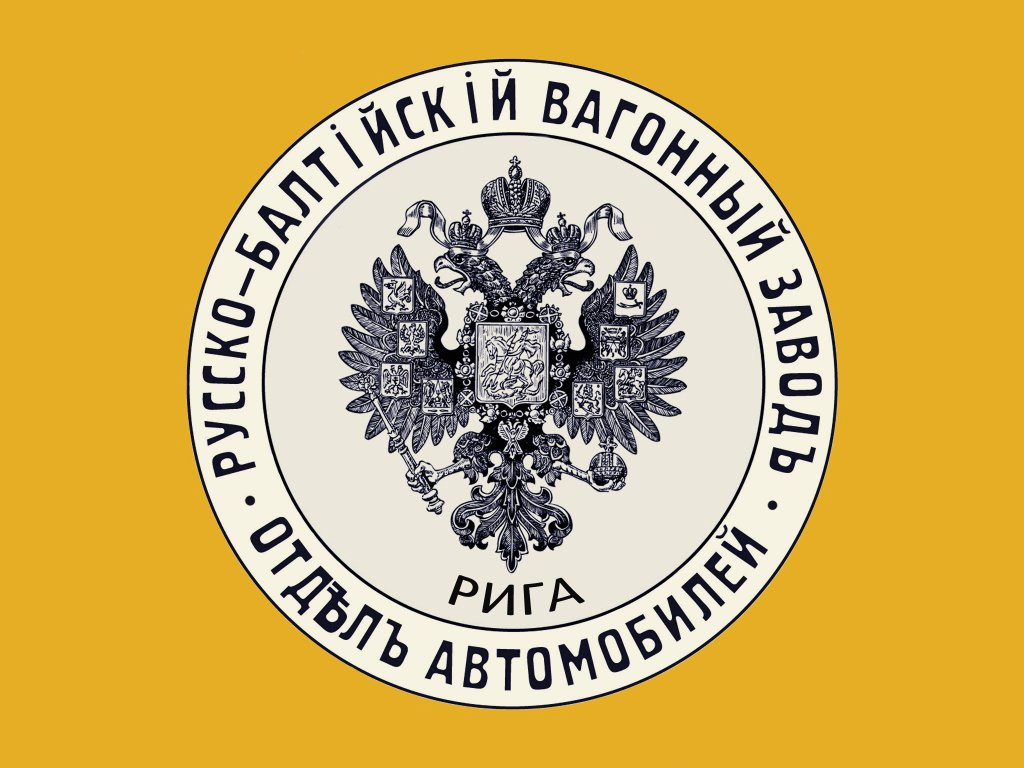
- Founded: 1894
- Headquarters: Moscow, Russia

Russo-Balt (sometimes Russobalt or Russo-Baltique) was one of the first Russian companies that produced vehicles and aircraft between 1909 and 1923.

A Russo-Balt K 12/20, one of the only 2 original Russo-balts known to exist today, on display in the Polytechnical Museum (Moscow)

== History ==
=== Riga factory ===
The Russo-Baltic Wagon Factory (German: Russisch-Baltische Waggonfabrik; Russian: Русско-Балтийский вагонный завод, RBVZ) was founded in 1874 in Riga, then a major industrial centre of Russian Empire. Originally, the new company was an affiliate of the Van der Zypen & Charlier company in Cologne-Deutz, Germany.

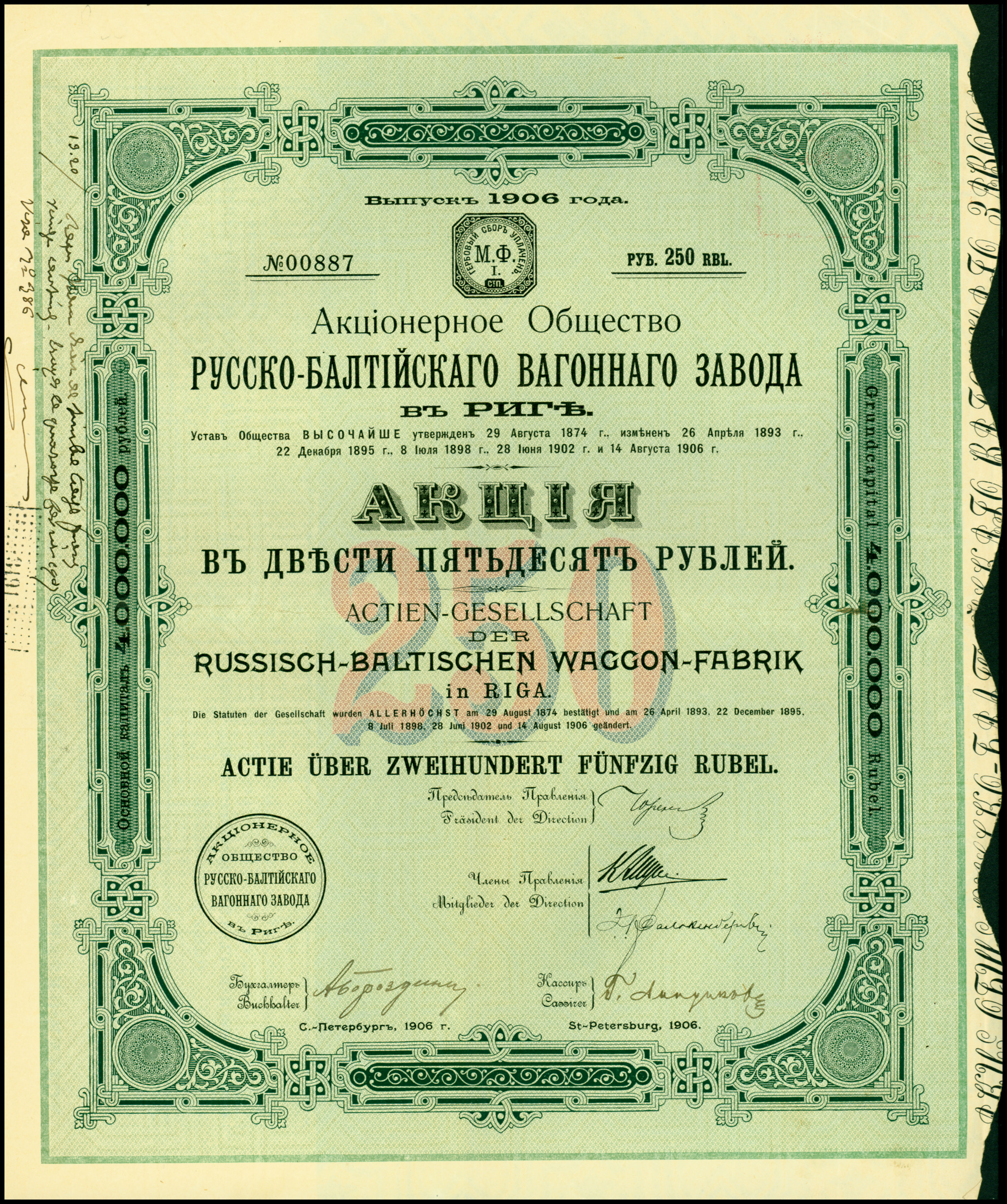
Share of the Russisch-Baltischen Waggon-Fabrik, issued 1906

In 1894 the majority of its shares were sold to investors in Riga and St. Petersburg, among them local Baltic German merchants F. Meyer, K. Amelung, and Chr. Schroeder, as well as Schaje Berlin, a relative of Isaiah Berlin. The company eventually grew to 3,800 employees.

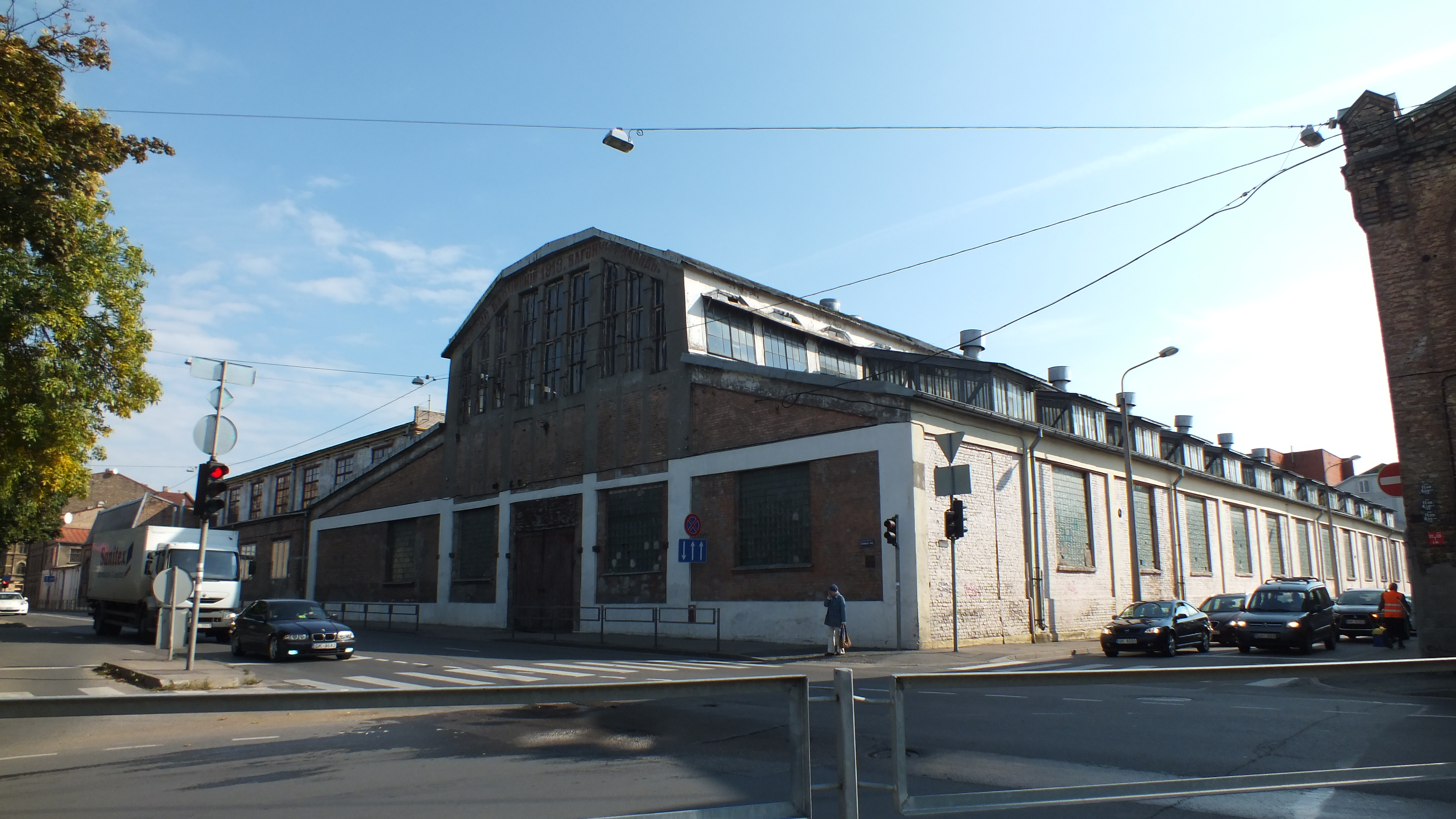
Russo-Balt factory building in Riga, Latvia built in 1913, with the writing on the front end of the clerestory

Between 1909 and 1915 some 625 cars were built at the railway car factory RBVZ, initially to the designs of the young Swiss engineer Julian Potterat. Potterat had formerly been a designer at Automobiles Charles Fondu in Brussels, and was now at age 26, director of the RBVZ car section and a principal designer. In 1915 the Riga factory was evacuated, with the equipment being transferred to St. Petersburg, Fili (Moscow) and Tver.

Today in Riga, Latvia, there is a company named Russo-Balt that manufactures trailers. Another self-proclaimed successor is the luxury armored SUVs producer Dartz.

=== St Petersburg factory ===
In early 1912, company director M. V. Shidlovsky hired 22-year-old Igor Sikorsky as the chief engineer for RBVZ's new aircraft division in St. Petersburg. Sikorsky's airplane had recently won a military aircraft competition in Moscow. He brought several engineers with him to RBVZ, and agreed that the company would own his designs for the next five years.

This group quickly produced a series of airplanes. Among these were the S-5, S-7, S-9, S-10 (1913), S-11, S-12, S-16 (1915), S-20 (1916), Russky Vityaz (The Grand) (1913), and a series named Il'ya Muromets starting in 1913.

Relatedly, in 1914, Shidlovsky was appointed commander of the newly formed EVK (Eskadra vozdushnykh korablei, Squadron of Flying Ships). This squadron flew Il'ya Muromets bombers during World War I.

The Bolshevik Revolution brought an end to the aircraft business. Sikorsky left for France in 1918. Shidlovsky and his son were arrested in 1919, while attempting to go to Finland, and were murdered.

After the 1917 revolution a second factory was opened in St. Petersburg, where they built armored cars on chassis produced in Riga.

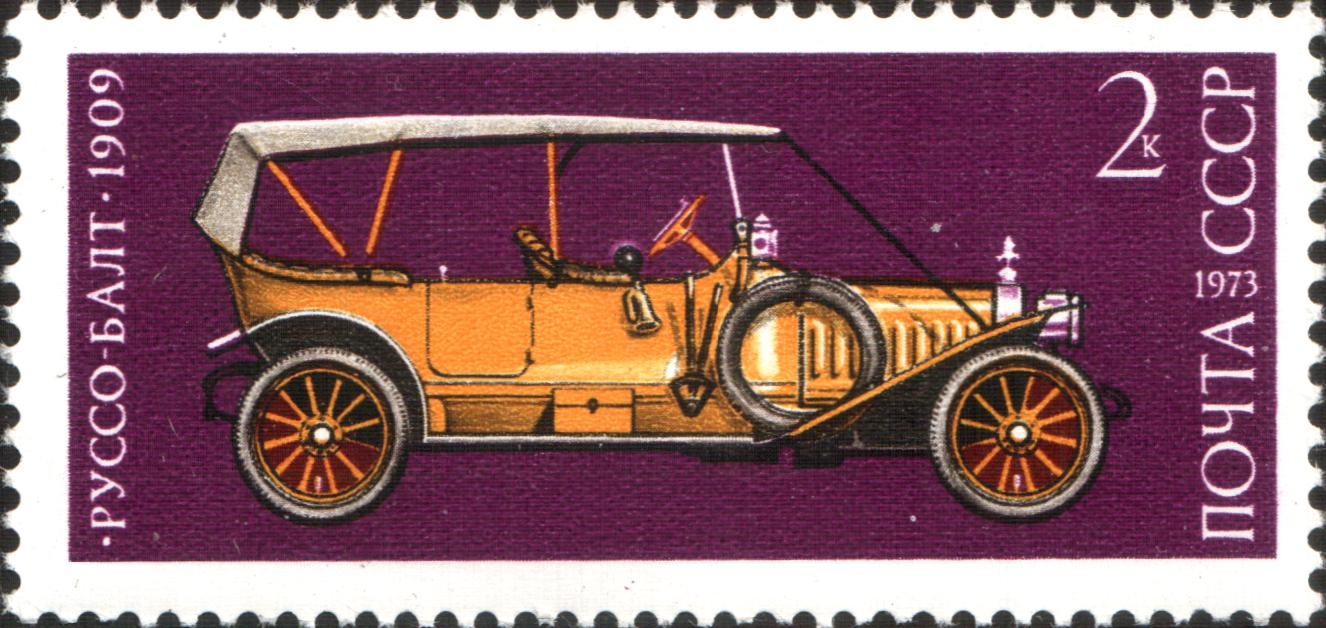
1973 USSR postage stamp with a 1909 Russo-Balt car.

=== Moscow factory ===
In 1922, the production was moved from St. Petersburg to BTAZ in Moscow. The Moscow plant was evacuated to Kazan in 1941, leading to the establishment of the Kazan Aircraft Production Association. The Moscow site later became home to the Khrunichev Space Center.

=== 2000s Concept car ===
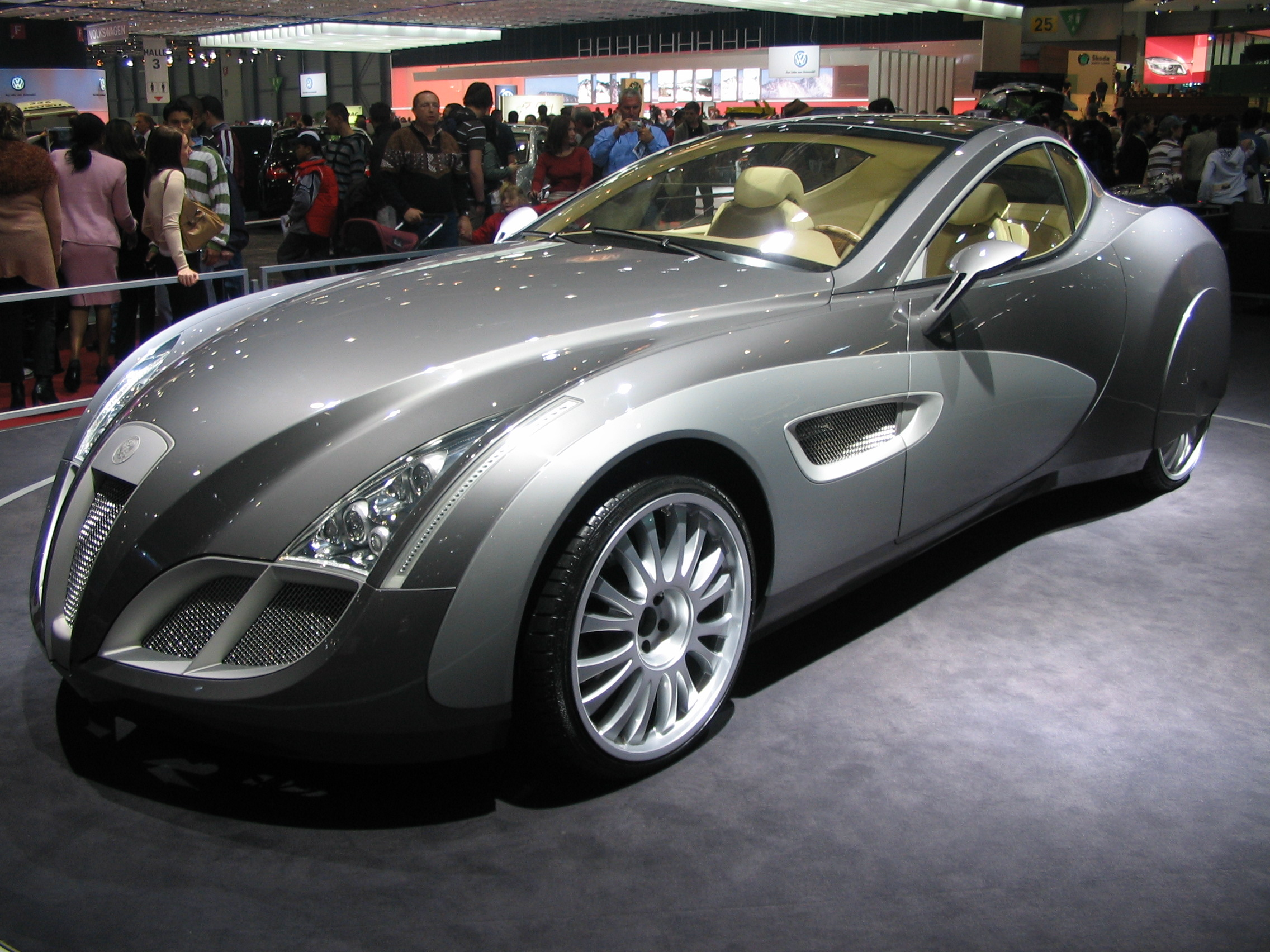
Russo-Baltique Impression concept car (2006).

The brand "Руссо-Балт" was resurrected in 2006 by a group of German and Russian investors to propose a luxury concept car, the Russo-Baltique Impression, billed as a coupé with strong hints of European styling of the early 1930s. The car uses mechanical parts of Mercedes origin (Mercedes CL63 AMG), was first introduced at the 2006 Concours d'Elegance.

The car was meant to be produced by the German company Gerg GmbH (or perhaps Russo-Baltique Engineering GmbH). Total production of 10 to 15 cars maximum was expected, with a production rate of 2 to 3 cars a year. The selling price would have been around 50,000,000 rubles or 870,000 US dollars, but the project never materialized.

The current owner of the international trademark "Russo-Balt" is Russo-Balt, LLC (OOO), Moscow, Russia.

== List of products ==
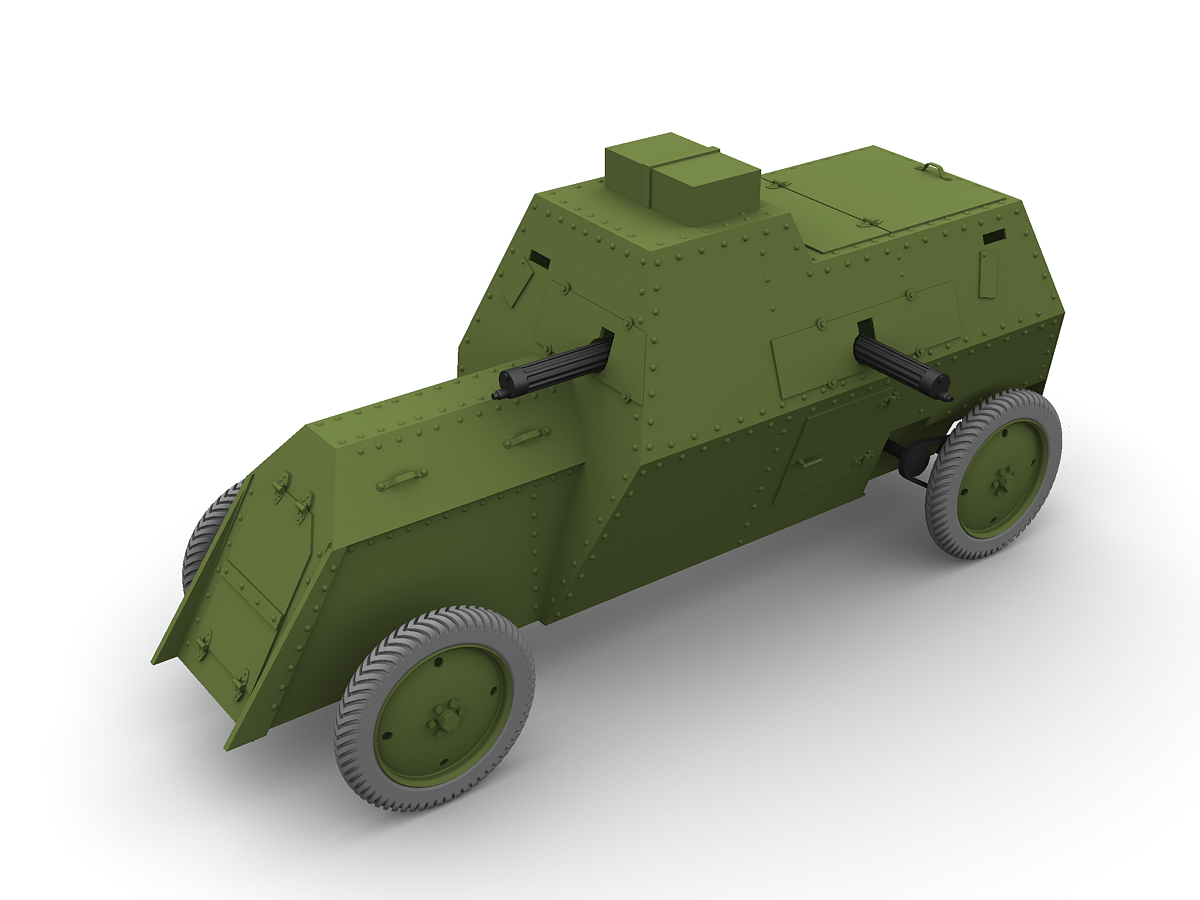
3D model of a Russo-Balt armoured car (1914)

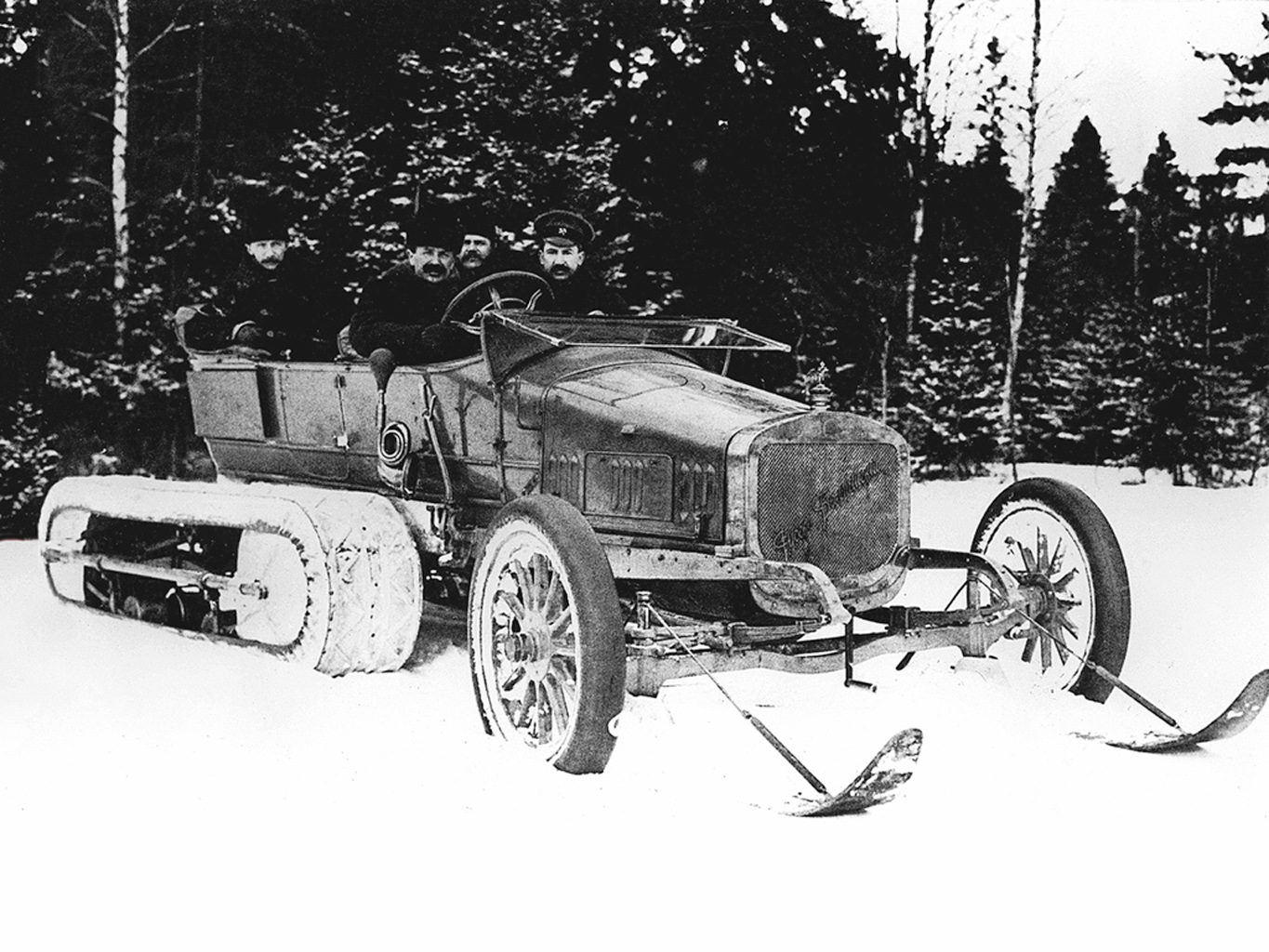
"Russo-Balt" "C24-30" from the garage of Tsar Nicholas II with Kegresse track design of Adolphe Kegresse

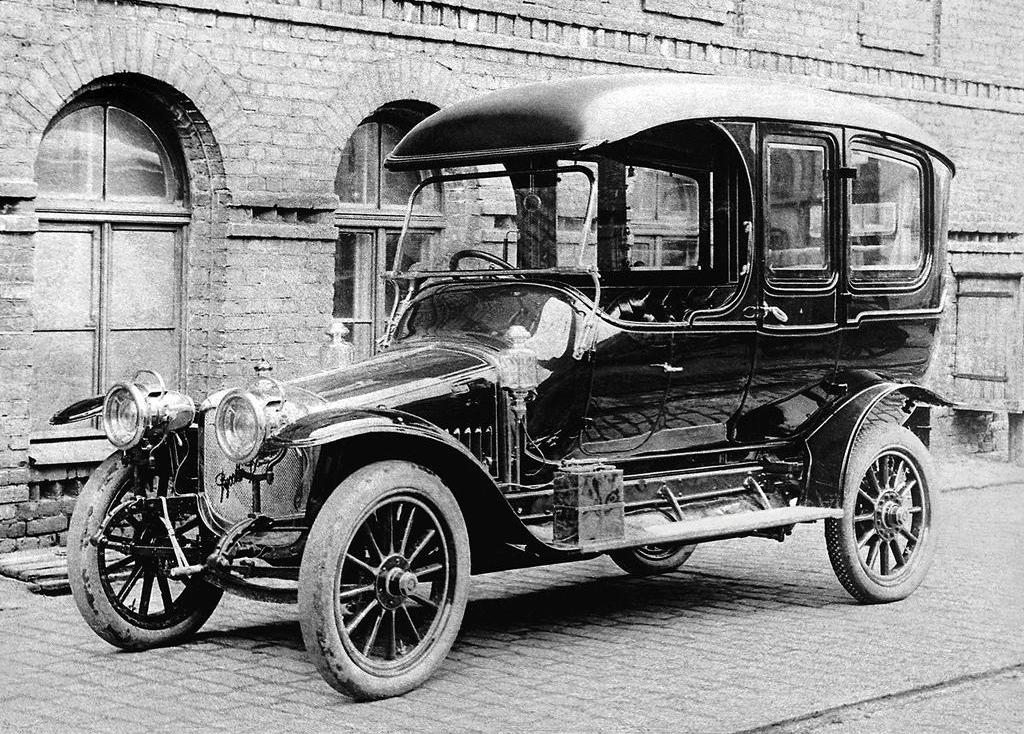
Russo-Baltique C24-40 (1913)

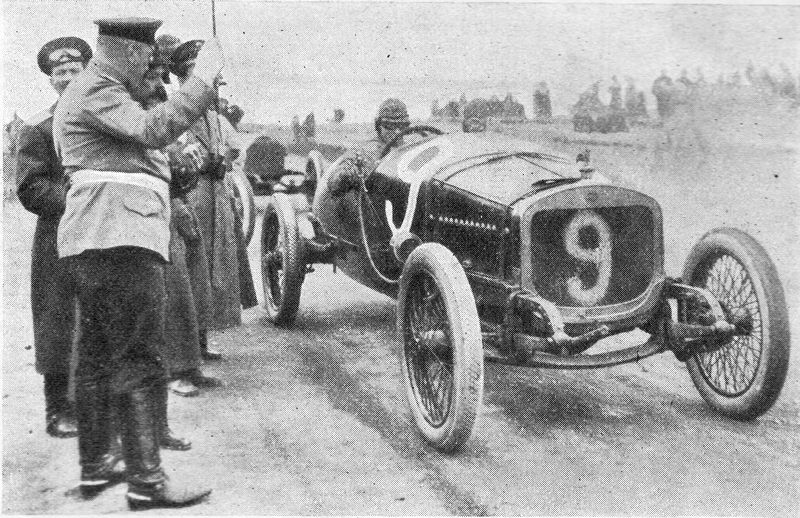
Ivanov at the start of the Russian Grand Prix in 1913 driving Russo-Baltique C24/58 4-cylinder car.

Russo-Balt produced trucks, buses and cars, often more or less copies of cars from the German Rex-Simplex or Belgian Fondu Trucks.

Only two original vehicles have survived to the present day. One is a Russo-Balt fire engine built on a Type D truck chassis in 1912. This is on display at the Riga Motor Museum in Latvia. The other is a Russo-Balt K12/20 from 1911, which is shown at the Polytechnical Museum in Moscow, Russia.

=== Aircraft ===
- S-5 (1911)
- S-7 (1912)
- S-9 (1913)
- S-10 (1913)
- S-11 (1913)
- S-12 (1913)
- S-16 (1915)
- S-20 (1916)
- Russky Vityaz (The Grand) (1913)
- Il'ya Muromets series (S-22 to S-27) starting in 1913
- Prototype Alexander Nevsky (1916)

=== Aircraft engines ===
- RBVZ-6 (1915)
- MRB-6 (1915)

=== Cars ===
- 24/30 (1909)
- Type C (1909)
  - C24/30 (1909)
    - C24/30 Faeton (≥ 1909)
    - Landole C24/30 (1909)
  - C24/40 (1913)
  - C24/50 (1909/'10/'1/'2)
  - C24/55 (1912)
  - C24/58 (1909/'10/'1/'2/'3)
- Type K (1909)
  - K12/20 (1909)
- Type E (1914)
- Impression (2006)

=== Military vehicles ===
- Type C (1912) (based on normal model)
- Armoured versions of different models (1914)

=== Trucks ===
- Type D (1912)
- Type M (1913)
- Type T (1913)

== See also ==
- Alexander Leutner & Co.
- Dux Factory
