= Kaicene F300 =

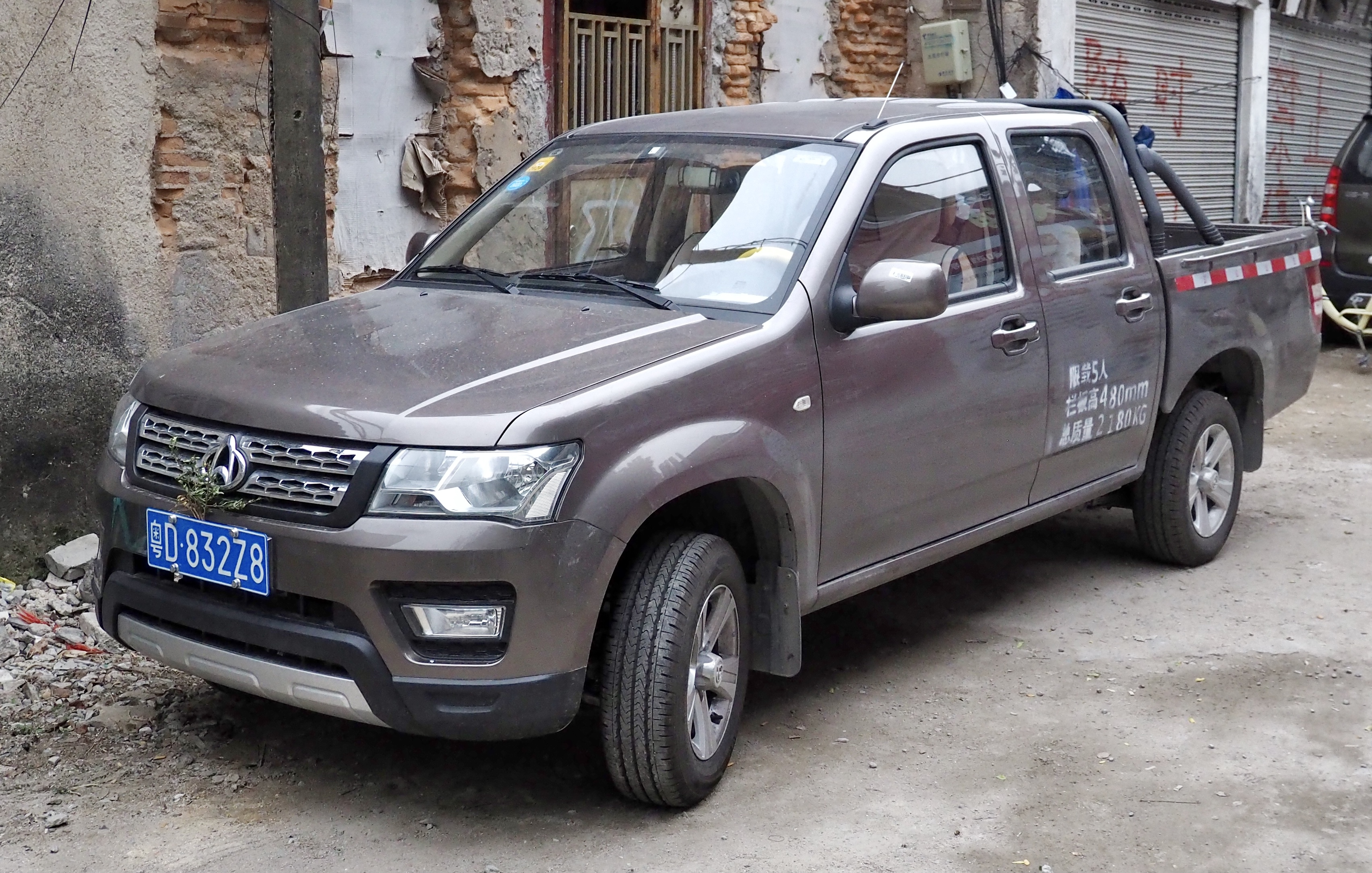

Overview
- Manufacturer: Changan Automobile
- Also called: Changan Shenqi F50 (until 2020); Changan F30; Changan Shenqi F30 (2016–2022)
- Production: 2016–2025

Body and chassis
- Class: Compact pickup truck
- Body style: 4-door crew cab 2-door single cab
- Layout: Front engine, rear wheel drive; Front engine, four wheel drive

Powertrain
- Engine: 1.5 L I4 (gasoline); 2.2 L 491QE I4 (gasoline)
- Transmission: 5-speed manual

Dimensions
- Wheelbase: 3,180 mm (125.2 in)
- Length: 4,980 mm (196.1 in) (standard wheelbase); 5,535 mm (217.9 in) (long wheelbase); 5,095 mm (200.6 in) (F50 standard wheelbase); 5,450 mm (214.6 in) (F50 long wheelbase)
- Width: 1,720 mm (67.7 in)(standard wheelbase); 1,690 mm (66.5 in) (long wheelbase); 1,740 mm (68.5 in) (F50)
- Height: 1,700 mm (66.9 in); 1,710 mm (67.3 in) (F50)

The Kaicene F300 (凯程 神骐F300), previously the Kaicene F30 until 2022, is a compact pickup truck which was developed by Changan Automobile under the sub brand Kaicene since January 2016.

== Overview ==
The Kaicene F30 is the first product of Kaicene's Shenqi series pickup trucks. The F30 is categorized as a compact pickup truck available as standard and long wheelbase models. The long wheelbase model is 55mm longer and 30 mm narrower than the standard wheelbase model, and only the standard wheelbase model is equipped with fog lamps. The standard wheelbase model has a cargo bed with dimensions: 1500×1415×480mm while the long wheelbase model has a cargo bed with dimensions: 2020×1465×400mm. The crew cab models were the first to launch in 2016 while the single cab model was launched later in July 2018. The single cab model features a dropside bed with dimensions: 3000×1580×400mm.

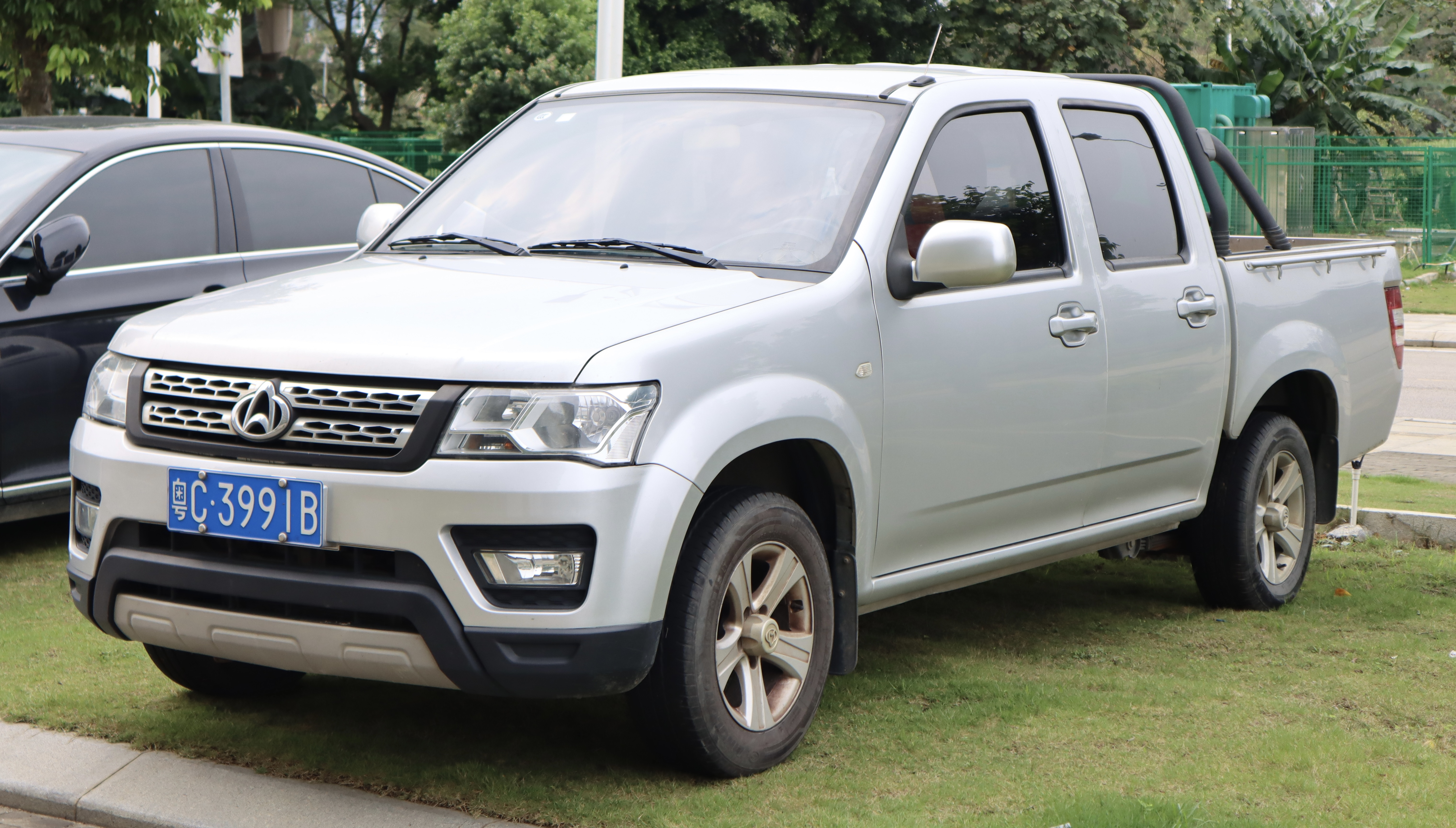
Front view of the Kaicene F30.

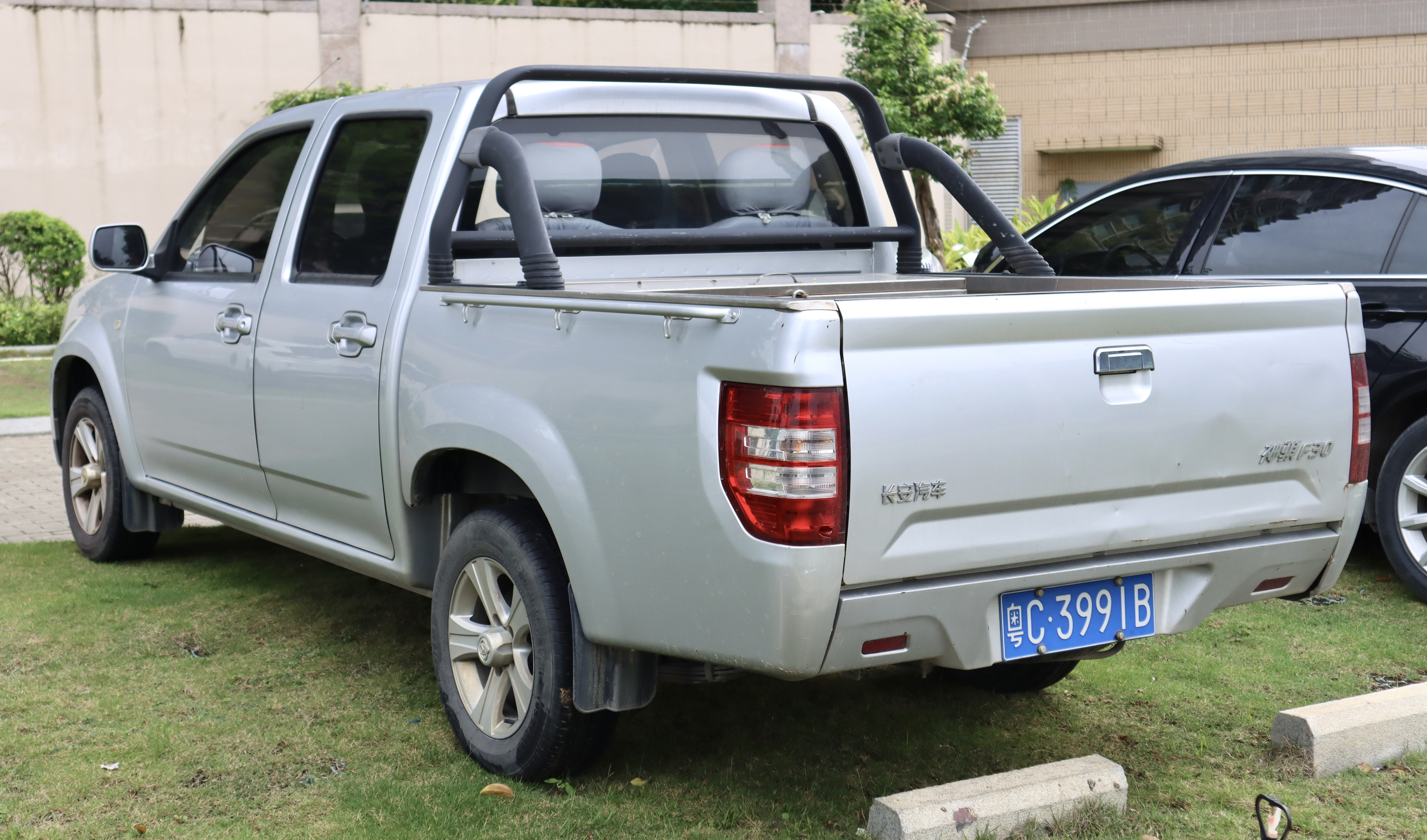
Rear view of the Kaicene F30.

=== Powertrain ===
The full model range of the F30 is powered by a 1.5-litre Mitsubishi gasoline engine with a maximum output of 112 hp (84 kW) and 142 N⋅m (105 lb⋅ft) supplied by Dongan mated to a 5-speed manual transmission.

== Kaicene F50 ==
The Kaicene F50 is a mid-size pickup truck based on the same platform and body work as the F30 while being slightly larger than the F30. The Kaicene F50 features a redesigned front end to differentiate from the F30. The standard wheelbase model has a cargo bed with dimensions: 1380×1465×480mm while the long wheelbase model has a cargo bed with dimensions: 1740×1465×480mm. The Kaicene F50 is discontinued as of 2020.

=== Powertrain ===
The full model range of the F50 is powered by a 2.2-litre gasoline engine codenamed 491QE with a maximum output of 106 hp (79 kW) mated to a 5-speed manual transmission.

== Kaicene F300 ==
The Kaicene F300 is facelift version of F30.
