= Sikorsky S-7 =

Experimental Russian monoplane prototype from 1912

S-7
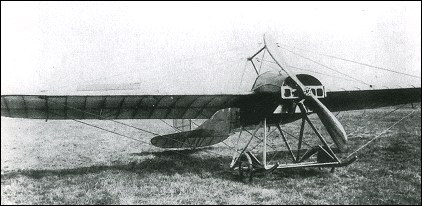
- Sikorsky S-7 circa 1912

General information
- Type: Experimental
- National origin: Russian Empire
- Manufacturer: Russian Baltic Railroad Car Works
- Designer: Igor Sikorsky
- Status: sold to Bulgarian Army for use in World War I
- Number built: 1

History
- First flight: July 1912

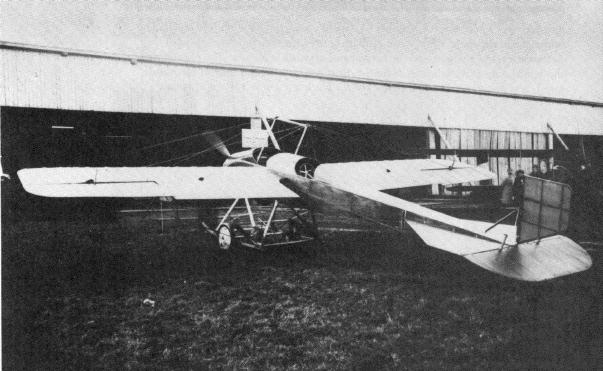
S-7 view from aft

The Sikorsky S-7 was a Russian single engine experimental prototype aircraft built by the Russian Baltic Railroad Car Works shortly after Igor Sikorsky became chief engineer of the aircraft manufacturing division.

== Design and development ==
The S-7 was two-seater wire-braced monoplane powered by a 70 hp (52 kW) Gnome air-cooled rotary engine. Construction began in early summer of 1912 and completed in July. The pilot sat in the rear cockpit with a passenger seated in a forward compartment in a tandem arrangement. The fuselage was enclosed in plywood and the aircraft used components taken from the S-6A including the main wing, tail and landing gear.

== Operational history ==
The S-7 was entered in the international military competition at Saint Petersburg in August 1912. During a take-off attempt from a furrowed field the landing gear was severely damaged and the S-7 was unable to finish the completion. In 1913 the aircraft was repaired and served as a trainer. In 1914 Bulgaria purchased the S-7 and used it in operations during World War I.

== Specifications ==
Data from Russian Aviation Museum

General characteristics

- Crew: One
- Capacity: One passenger
- Length: 26 ft 11 in (8.2 m)
- Upper wingspan: 32 ft 10 in (10 m)
- Wing area: 220 sq ft (20 m^{2})
- Empty weight: 990 lb (449 kg)
- Gross weight: 1,711 lb (776 kg)
- Powerplant: 1 × Gnome Lambda 7-cylinder air-cooled rotary piston engine, 70 hp (52 kW)

Performance

- Maximum speed: 67 mph (108 km/h, 58 kn)
