= Farman F.30 =

Biplane model

F.30A

General information
- Type: Fighter
- National origin: France
- Manufacturer: Farman
- Number built: 2

History
- First flight: December 1916

The Farman F.30A C2 was a two-seat biplane designed as a fighter in France in 1916 and powered by a single, water-cooled radial engine. It showed poor flight characteristics and only one was built, though it was modified twice. It should not be confused with the similarly named Henry Farman HF.30 of 1915, a completely different aircraft which was used in large numbers by the Imperial Russian Air Service.

== Design and development ==
The F.30 representing a departure from the pusher configuration with which Farman had previously been associated, adopting what was becoming the more conventional aeroplane design, with the propeller at the front and a continuous streamlined fuselage, first flew in December 1916.

The F.30A was a metal framed biplane with considerable overhang of the upper planes, a fairly common feature of Henry Farman's designs (as in the F.40), though possibly it was not strictly a sesquiplane. The inner part of the wing structure, out to the tips of the lower wing, formed a single bay unit, without stagger and braced by simple parallel interplane struts. These struts continued above the upper surface, with the outer parts of the upper wing wire braced to them. Ailerons were fitted to the outer, upper wings.

The fuselage was mounted between the wings on central struts above and below and was circular in cross-section, tapering towards the tail. The horizontal tail surfaces were rectangular, and the rudder and wide chord fin formed a shallow triangle. There were two cockpits, seating the pilot under the wing and the gunner further aft with a large radiator between them. The 120 kW (160 hp) water-cooled Canton-Unné X-9 radial engine gave the F.30A a short nose. Its simple conventional undercarriage had a single mainwheel on each main leg and radius arm.

By May 1917 the F.30A was undergoing official evaluation by the Service Technique de l'Aéronautique (STAé ) at Villacoublay, where the positioning of the radiator between the two crew was disliked and the handling found to be poor, causing rejection of the aircraft. Farman then modified it by shortening the upper span and using a more powerful engine, another water-cooled radial, the 190 kW (260 hp) Salmson 9Za. They returned to the STAé with the F.30B, which after more test flights, the STAé called for further changes, requiring the wing area to be increased from 34.7 m^{2} (374 sq ft) to 54 m^{2} (580 sq ft). Farman did this with an increase of span, the larger upper wing now extending 14 m (46 ft) from tip to tip. Trials of what was now known as the F.30B AR2 resumed at the STAé resumed in early 1918, but by April the lack of both lateral and longitudinal stability caused tests and the aircraft's development to be abandoned.

== Variants ==
Data from:French aircraft of the First World War

- F.30A C2
  2-seat fighter 120 kW (160 hp) Canton-Unné X-9 water-cooled radial engine, first flown in December 1916; one built.
  F.30B C2
  Modification with 190 kW (260 hp) Salmson 9Za 9-cylinder water-cooled radial. Span shorter by 1.79 m (5 ft 10 in), fuselage longer by 1 m (3 ft 3 in), first flown in July 1917; one built.
  F.30B AR2
  2-seat Avion de Reconnaissance, modification of the F.30B, with upper wing span extended to 14 m (46 ft), first flown in 1918.

== Specifications (F.30B) ==
Data from French aircraft of the First World War, Aviafrance:Farman F.30B, Les avions Farman

General characteristics

- Crew: 2 pilot and gunner
- Length: 7.29 m (23 ft 11 in)
- Wingspan: 11.01 m (36 ft 1 in)
- Height: 2.96 m (9 ft 9 in)
- Wing area: 34.71 m^{2} (373.6 sq ft)
- Empty weight: 680 kg (1,499 lb)
- Gross weight: 1,100 kg (2,425 lb)
- Powerplant: 1 × Salmson 9 Za 9-cylinder water-cooled radial, 190 kW (260 hp)
- Propellers: 2-bladed fixed pitch wooden propeller

Performance

- Maximum speed: 208 km/h (129 mph, 112 kn) at 2,000 m (6,600 ft)
- Time to altitude: 3,000 m (9,800 ft) in 11 minutes

Armament

- Guns: 1x 7.7 mm (0.303 in) fixed synchronised Vickers machine gun, with 1x 7.7 mm (0.303 in) Lewis gun in the rear cockpit on a flexible mount

== Bibliography ==
- Liron, Jean (1984). Les avions Farman. Collection Docavia. Vol. 21. Paris: Éditions Larivière. OCLC 37146471.
