= Sikorsky S-16 =

Russian aircraft from 1915

S-16
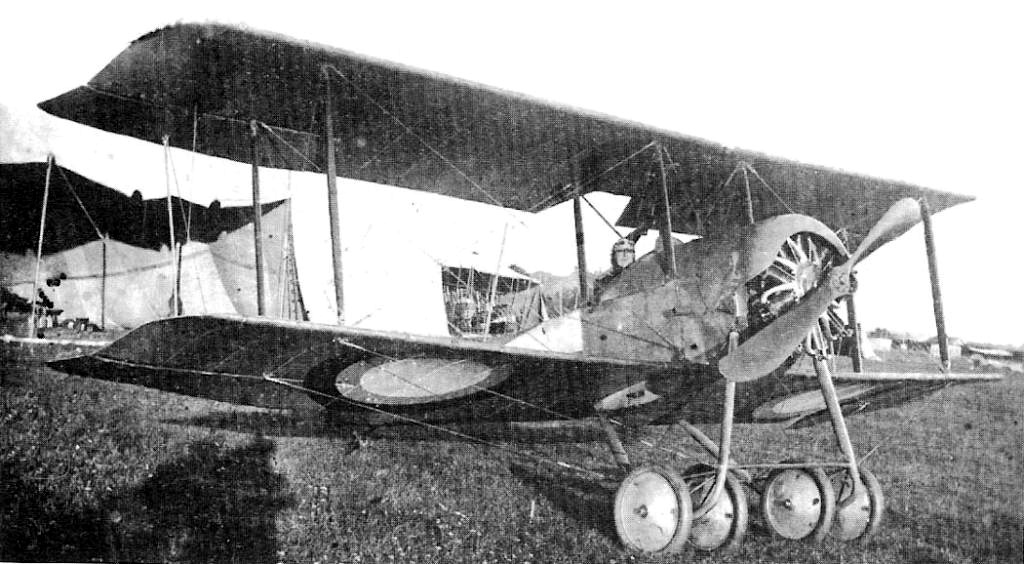
- Sikorsky S-16 circa 1915

General information
- Type: Fighter
- National origin: Russian Empire
- Manufacturer: RBVZ (Russo-Baltic Wagon Works)
- Designer: Igor Sikorsky
- Primary users: Imperial Russian Air Service Soviet Air Force

History
- Introduction date: January 1916
- First flight: 6 February 1915
- Retired: 1923

The Sikorsky S-16, or RBVZ S-XVI (named after its manufacturer), was a Russian equi-span single-bay two-seat biplane designed by Igor Sikorsky in 1914–15. Conceived in response to demand for an escort fighter for the Ilya Muromets bombers, it was noteworthy in that it was one of the first aircraft to possess synchronisation gear for its 7.7 mm machine gun. The first S-XVI was completed on 6 February 1915 with an 80 hp engine instead of the intended 100 hp because of supply problems. On 17 December 1915, the Russian government placed an order for 18 aircraft, these being delivered in early 1916.

== Operational history ==
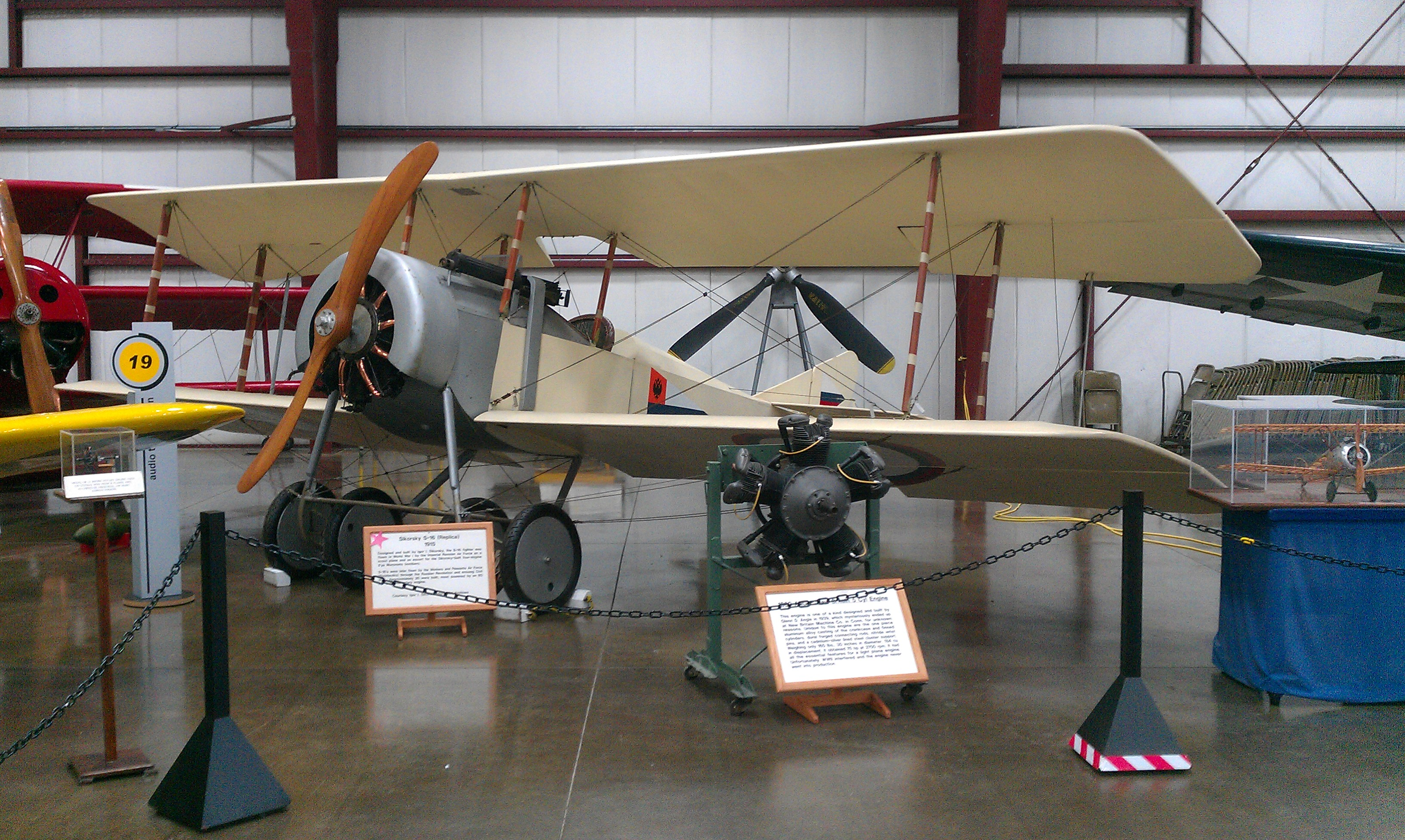
Full scale non-flying replica of the S-16 exhibited at the New England Air Museum in Connecticut

Although highly maneuverable, the S-XVI possessed a comparatively poor performance due to insufficient power. A further small batch were completed in 1917, with the aircraft being used during the Russian Revolution and staying in service until 1923. At least one aircraft have been used by the Ukrainian People's Republic after 1917.

== Operators ==
Russian Empire

- Imperial Russian Air Service

Soviet Russia

- Soviet Air Forces

Ukrainian People's Republic

- Ukrainian People's Republic Air Fleet

== Specifications ==
Data from Sikorsky S-XVI escort fighter

General characteristics

- Crew: 1
- Length: 6.2 m (20 ft 4 in)
- Wingspan: 8.4 m (27 ft 7 in)
- Height: 2.78 m (9 ft 1 in)
- Wing area: 25.36 m^{2} (273.0 sq ft)
- Empty weight: 407 kg (897 lb)
- Gross weight: 676 kg (1,490 lb)
- Powerplant: 1 × Le Rhône 9J 9-cylinder air-cooled rotary engine, 75 kW (100 hp)

Alternative engine : 80 hp (60 kW) Gnome Monosoupape 7 Type A 7-cylinder rotary engine

- Propellers: 2-bladed fixed-pitch propeller

Performance

- Maximum speed: 120 km/h (75 mph, 65 kn)
- Service ceiling: 3,500 m (11,500 ft)
- Rate of climb: 2.08 m/s (400 ft/min)
- Time to altitude: 1,000 m (3,300 ft) in 8 minutes
- Wing loading: 26.8 kg/m^{2} (5.5 lb/sq ft)
- Power/mass: 0.14 hp/kg

Armament

- Guns: 1 x 7.7 mm Lavrov machine gun or 1 х Vickers machine gun with 500 rpg

== Bibliography ==
- William Green and Gordon Swanborough. The Complete Book of Fighters. Colour Library Direct, Godalming, UK: 1994. ISBN 1-85833-777-1.
- Kulikov, Victor (June 1998). "Les chasseurs Sikorsky das le Grande Guerre (1ère partie)" [Sikorsky's Fighters During the Great War]. Avions: Toute l'aéronautique et son histoire (in French) (63): 20–25. ISSN 1243-8650.
- Kulikov, Victor (July 1998). "Les chasseurs Sikorsky das le Grande Guerre (dernière partie)" [Sikorsky's Fighters During the Great War]. Avions: Toute l'aéronautique et son histoire (in French) (64): 20–29. ISSN 1243-8650.
