= Anatra D Anade =

Anatra D
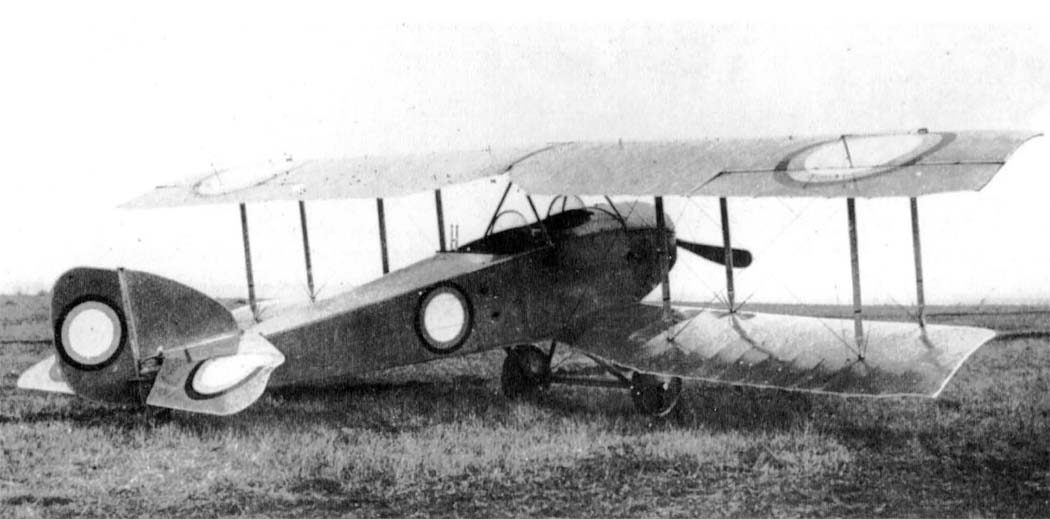

General information
- Type: Reconnaissance aircraft
- Manufacturer: Anatra
- Designer: Elysée Alfred Descamps
- Number built: 170

History
- First flight: 19 December 1915
- Variants: Anatra DS

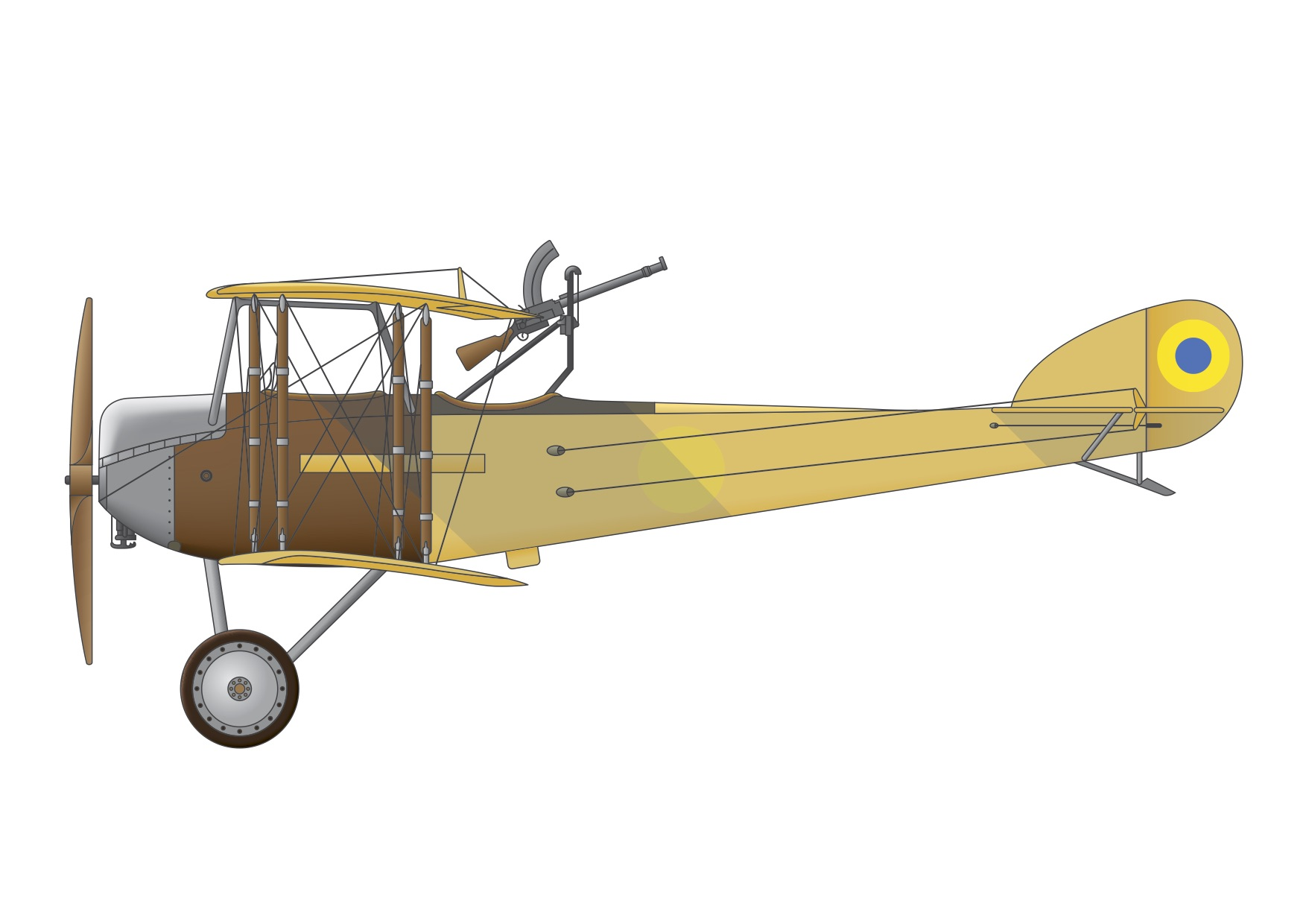
Kyiv, March-April 1918. Ukrainian People's Republic Air Fleet.

The Anatra D or Anade was a two-seat reconnaissance aircraft built in Odessa, Russian Empire and flown during World War I. It was a two-bay biplane of conventional configuration that seated the pilot and observer in tandem, open cockpits. Test flights revealed a number of design flaws, including weak wing structure that would later kill the company test pilot on 21 July 1917 and poor stability. Despite the problems, the aircraft was ordered into production by the Army, and deliveries commenced in May 1916 after revisions had been made to correct the aircraft's centre of gravity in the hope of addressing the worst handling problems. The type continued in limited service after the war, eventually being used as a trainer until about 1919.

== Operators ==
Russian Empire

- Imperial Russian Air Service acquired 170 aircraft, initial deliveries began on 16 May 1916

Soviet Russia

- Soviet Air Forces

Ukrainian People's Republic

- Ukrainian People's Republic Air Fleet

== Specifications ==
General characteristics

- Crew: two, pilot and observer
- Length: 7.70 m (25 ft 3 in)
- Wingspan: 11.50 m (37 ft 9 in)
- Height: 2.9 m (9 ft 6 in)
- Wing area: 35.0 m^{2} (377 sq ft)
- Empty weight: 515 kg (1,135 lb)
- Gross weight: 865 kg (1,907 lb)
- Powerplant: 1 × Gnôme Monosoupape , 74 kW (100 hp)

Performance

- Maximum speed: 132 km/h (82 mph, 71 kn)
- Range: 350 km (220 mi, 190 nmi)
- Service ceiling: 4,000 m (13,100 ft)
- Rate of climb: 2.4 m/s (470 ft/min)

Armament

- 1 × .303 Vickers machine gun or 7.62×54mmR Madsen machine gun for observer
- up to 30 kg (65 lb) of bombs
