= Anatra DS Anasal =

Anasal
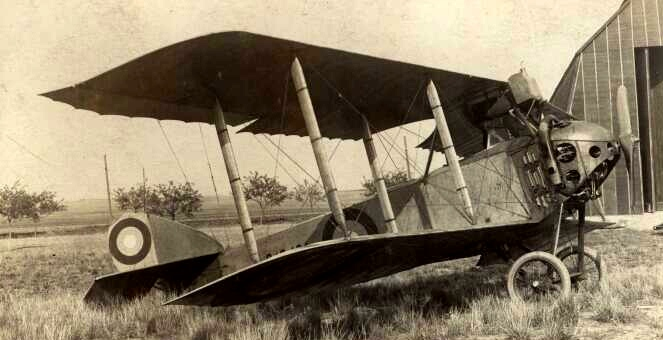

General information
- Type: Reconnaissance aircraft
- Manufacturer: Anatra
- Designer: Elysée Alfred Descamps
- Number built: some 184

History
- First flight: 16 July 1916
- Variants: Anatra Anadis

The Anatra DS or Anasal was a two-seat reconnaissance aircraft developed from the Anatra D (Anade). It was built in the Anatra factory in Odessa in the Russian Empire and flown during World War I by both sides during the Russian Civil War.

The main difference from the previous model was the replacement of a 100 hp rotary engine with a much more powerful 150 hp Salmson radial engine, which improved performance. The engine was unusual, being one of the few water-cooled radial engines, hence the plane had a water radiator in front of the upper wing. This engine was license-built in Russia. The forward fuselage was similar to its predecessor, with a partial engine cowling, open at the bottom, with characteristic holes. The plane was also slightly larger and more heavily armed, adding a synchronised forward-firing machine gun for the pilot in addition to the observer's weapon.

The plane, named Anasal (short for Anatra Salmson) was first flown on 7 August 1916 (25 July 1916 old style). The first orders came only in 1917, and before the Soviet revolution in November 1917 some 60 to 70 had been manufactured, many others being in different stages of completion. Many details differed between individual aircraft.

In March 1918 Odessa was occupied by Austro-Hungarian forces, in accordance with the Treaty of Brest-Litovsk and in May the Austrian government ordered 200 Anasals, as the Anatra C.I, for training and observation. 114 were received by the Austrians by September 1918, some half being given to training units before the end of World War I. In October, the remainder of the order was cancelled.

The major postwar user of the Anasal was Czechoslovakia, with 23 former Austrian aircraft, used by the military, and later in civilian aviation. One of these has survived and is in the Prague Aviation Museum, Kbely. Eight Anasals were used by revolutionary forces in Hungary. Eight aircraft were acquired in March 1919 by the Polish 4th Rifle Division in Odessa, fighting in the Russian civil war on the White side, but only four were assembled and used until April. Another Anasal was captured and used by the Poles during the Polish-Soviet war in 1919–20.

A more advanced model was the Anatra DSS, with 160 hp Salmson engine, but few were made.

== Variants ==
- DS - two-seat reconnaissance aircraft
- DSS - a small number of aircraft with a more powerful 160 hp Salmson radial engine for slightly higher speed
- Anatra Anadis - fighter aircraft based on the Anasal design

== Operators ==
Austria-Hungary

- Imperial and Royal Aviation Troops

Czechoslovakia

- Czechoslovak Air Force Postwar, 23 aircraft.

Hungary

- Hungarian Air Force

Poland

- Polish Air Force Postwar, five aircraft in 1919-1920 (further four not assembled)

Russia

- Imperial Russian Air Service
- White Movement (1917–1923)

Soviet Union

- Soviet Air Force

== Specifications ==
Data from Gunston(1985) p.1

General characteristics

- Crew: two, pilot and observer
- Length: 8.10 m (26 ft 7 in)
- Wingspan: 11.40 m (37 ft 5 in)
- Height: 3.2 m (10 ft 6 in)
- Wing area: 37.0 m^{2} (398 sq ft)
- Empty weight: 814 kg (1,795 lb)
- Gross weight: 1,164 kg (2,566 lb)
- Powerplant: 1 × Salmson 9R radial , 112 kW (150 hp)

Performance

- Maximum speed: 144 km/h (90 mph, 78 kn)
- Endurance: 3 hours 30 minutes
- Service ceiling: 4,300 m (14,100 ft)
- Rate of climb: 3.0 m/s (600 ft/min)

Armament

- 1 × fixed, forward-firing 7.7 mm (.303) Vickers machine gun (Des Camps synchronizer)
- 1 × 7.7 mm (.303) Lewis machine gun for observer
- up to 50 kg bombs
