= Imperial Russian Air Service =

- Императорскій военно-воздушный флотъ
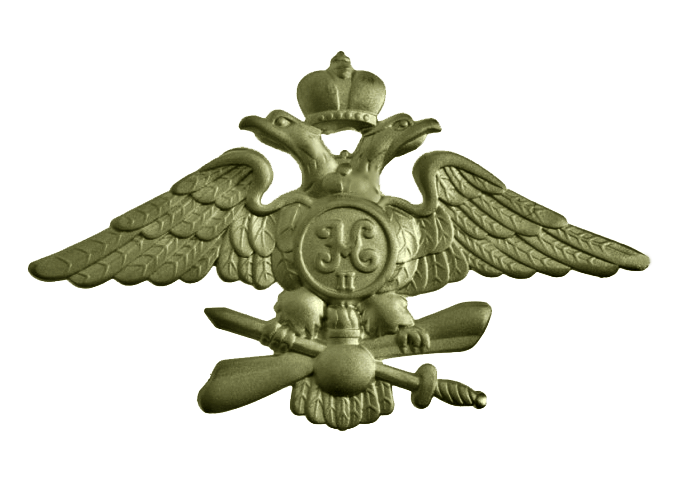
- Founded: 1912
- Disbanded: 1917
- Country: Russian Empire
- Type: Air force
- Role: Aerial warfare
- Part of: Engineer Corps (until 1912); Stavka (from 1915)
- Engagements: World War I

Insignia
- Roundel (one of several geometric variations)

- Fin flash

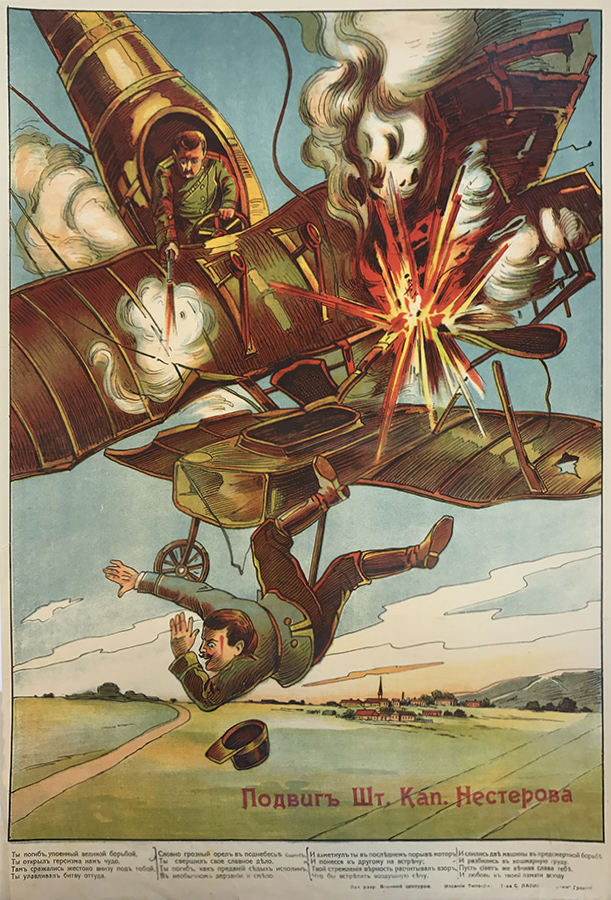
A Taran aerial ramming attack performed by Pyotr Nesterov, against an early Albatros B.I

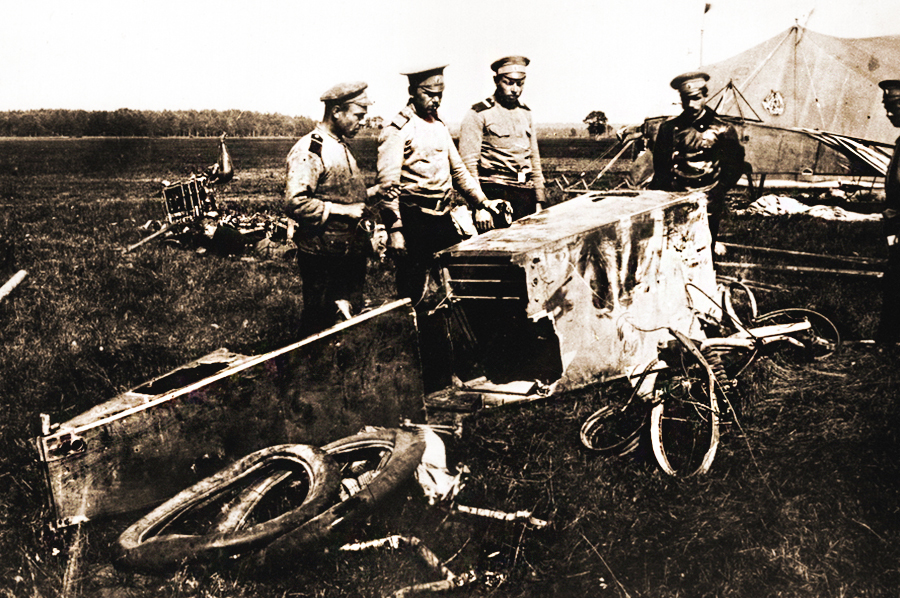
The remains of an Austro-Hungarian Albatros, the first enemy aeroplane destroyed in flight in the history of military aviation

The Imperial Russian Air Service (Russian (pre-reform): Императорскій военно-воздушный флотъ, romanized: Imperatorskiy voyenno-vozdushnyy flot", lit. 'Emperor's Military Air Fleet') was an air force founded in 1912 for Imperial Russia. The Air Service operated for five years and only saw combat in World War I before being reorganized and renamed in 1917 following the Russian Revolution.

With the onset of the Russian Civil War, some former IRAS pilots joined Alexander Kolchak on the White Russian side, but the White movement never created an official air force. Most of what remained of the former Imperial Russian Air Service was reformed into the subsequent Soviet Air Forces.

== History ==
=== Background ===
The origins of Russian aviation go back to theoretical projects of the 1880s by pioneer Russian scientists such as Nikolai Kibalchich and Alexander Mozhaysky. During the 1890s aviation innovation was further advanced by Konstantin Tsiolkovsky.

In 1902–1903 during military maneuvers in the Kiev Military District, the Imperial Russian Army used several aerostats for reconnaissance and coordination of artillery fire. The Aeronautical company (Отдельная воздухоплавательная рота, Otdel'naya vozdukhoplavatel'naya rota) was under the command of Colonel A.M. Kovanko.

In 1904 Nikolai Zhukovsky established the world's first Aerodynamic Institute (Russian: Аэродинамический институт, romanized: Aerodinamicheskiy institut) in Kuchino near Moscow. One aeronautical battalion (учебный Восточно-Сибирский воздухоплавательный батальон) with 4 aerostats took part in the Russo-Japanese War.

In 1908, the Russian Aeroclub (Russian: Всероссийский Аэроклуб, romanized: Vserossiyskiy Aeroklub, lit. 'All-Russian Aeroclub') was established.

In 1910, the Imperial Russian Army sent several officers to France for training as pilots. Later in the same year the Imperial Russian Army purchased a number of French and British aeroplanes and began training its first military pilots.

- the first aviation school was opened in the summer of 1910 in Gatchina
- the second aviation school was opened in the autumn of 1910 in Sevastopol (in 1912 this school was moved to Kacha)

Also in 1910, one biplane was built in Saint Petersburg which was intended to be used by the Army as a reconnaissance aircraft, but the aircraft lost in a competition against the French Farman III in 1911, and never entered service

On 12 August 1912 the Imperial Russian Air Service, formerly part of the Engineer Corps, became a separate branch of the army.

During the First Balkan War there was a Russian air unit in the Bulgarian Army which was composed of 10 civil volunteers (4 pilots and 6 technicians) and commanded by S. Schetinin

In 1913 Igor Sikorsky built the first four-engine biplane, the Russky Vityaz, and his famous bomber aircraft, the Ilya Muromets. The same year Dmitry Grigorovich built several "M-type" flying boats for the Imperial Russian Navy.

In 1914 Polish aviator Jan Nagórski conducted the first ever flights in the Arctic looking for the lost expedition of polar explorer Georgy Sedov.

=== World War I ===
At the beginning of World War I, Russia's air service had the largest air fleet in the Entente, followed by France (263 aeroplanes against 156 respectively and 14 airships).

After the war began, aviators were rearmed with 7.63mm Mauser C96, because German semi-automatic pistols were more effective weapons than standard 7.62mm Nagant revolvers. At least a few aviators were armed with carbines.

Initially, Russia used aircraft only for reconnaissance and coordination of artillery fire. Later, several aeroplanes were armed with steel flechettes to attack ground targets (columns of enemy infantry and cavalry, campsites, etc.). Later, aeroplanes were armed with air-dropped bombs.

On 8 September 1914, the Russian pilot Pyotr Nesterov performed the first aerial ramming aircraft attack in the history of aviation Later, Lt. Vyacheslav Tkachov became the very first Russian pilot who shot down an enemy aircraft with a handgun. He attacked a German "Albatros" and shot the enemy pilot.

In December 1914 a squadron of 10 Ilya Muromets bombers was formed and used against the German and Austro-Hungarian armies.

17 January 1915 – The Ministry of War of the Russian Empire issued an order to arm aeroplanes with 7.62mm Madsen light machine guns and 7.71mm Lewis light machine guns

In March 1915 naval aviation was established. The Imperial Russian Navy received two vessels and six seaplanes (one armed steamship "Император Николай I" which was converted into a seaplane carrier for five M-5 seaplanes and one cruiser "Алмаз" which was rebuilt with a place for one seaplane). The naval aviation section was not merged into the IRAS and became a part of Black Sea Fleet

On 31 March 1915 the Russian pilot Alexander Kazakov successfully performed the second ramming attack, using a Morane-Saulnier G as his piloted projectile.

Summer 1915 – petrol bombs (glass bottles containing a flammable mixture of gasoline and mazut) were used by pilots to attack ground targets

In 1915 the Imperial Russian Air Service became a separate branch of the army directly under the command of the Stavka (commander-in-chief's HQ).

In 1916 the size and force of naval aviation was increased, the Black Sea Fleet had two seaplane carriers ("Император Николай I" and "Император Александр I") and fourteen M-9 seaplanes

During World War I, 269 Russian aviators were awarded the St. George military decorations (St George Sword, Order of St. George or Cross of St. George), 5 aviators were awarded the Chevalier's National Order of the Legion of Honour, 2 aviators were awarded the Military Cross, 2 aviators were awarded the Order of the White Eagle and many others were awarded medals. 26 aviators became flying aces of Russian Empire. The most successful Russian flying ace and fighter pilot was Alexander Kazakov, who shot down 20 enemy aeroplanes.

However, the war was not going well for Russia and following significant setbacks on the Eastern front, and the economic collapse in the rear, military aircraft production fell far behind Russia's rival Germany.

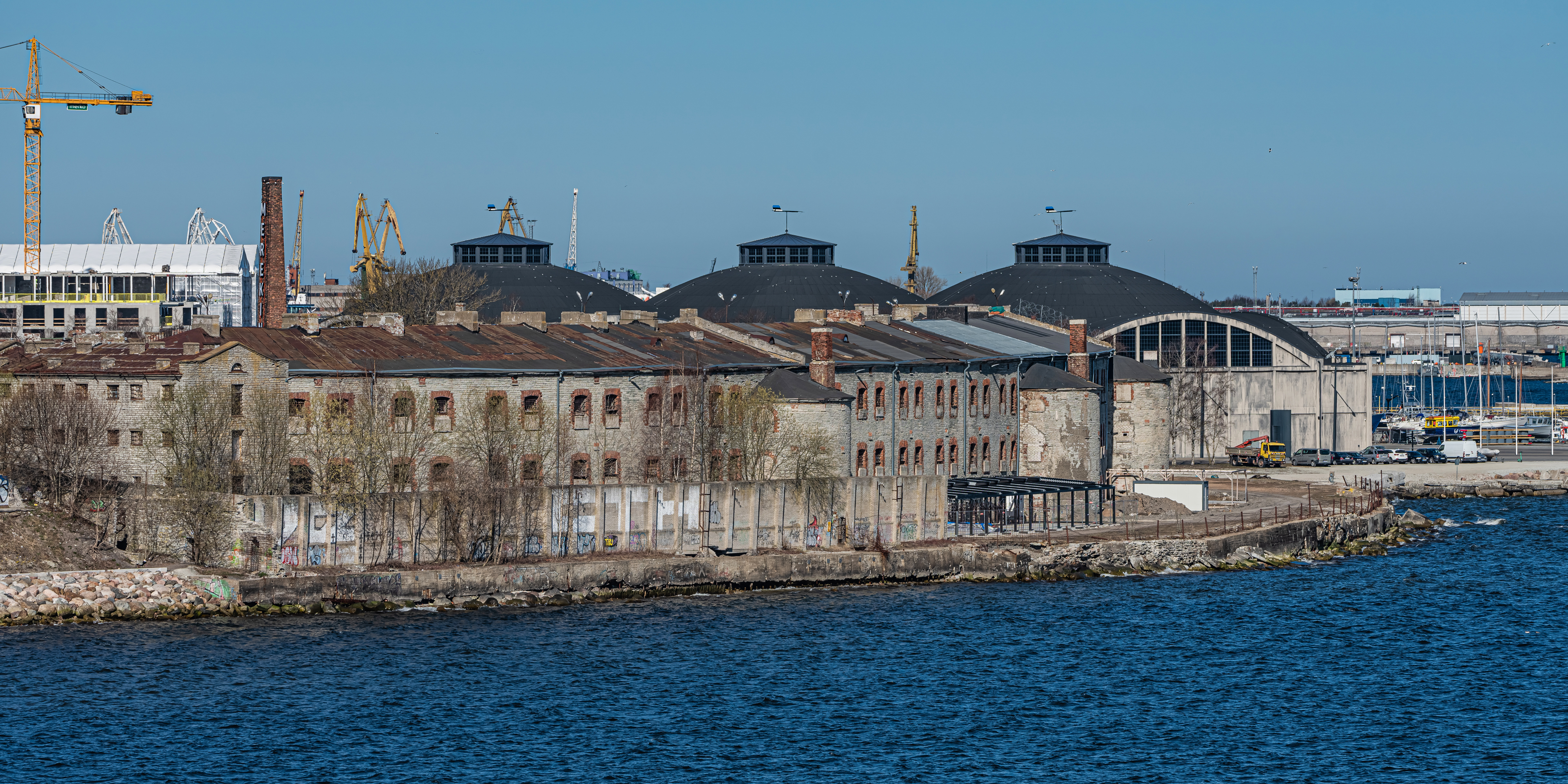
Aircraft hangars for seaplanes of the Imperial Russian Air Service in Reval harbor, some of the first such structures to be made of reinforced concrete

After the February Revolution of 1917 the Imperial Russian Air Service was reformed. Following the October Revolution of 1917, the Russian Air Service was dissolved.

- more than 1300 aeroplanes became a basis of Workers' and Peasants' Air Fleet. More than two-thirds of these aeroplanes were foreign-made. More than 50% of all aeroplanes were "Nieuports", more than 15% of all aeroplanes were "Farmans" and about 9% of all aeroplanes were "Voisins". Only 300–350 of these aeroplanes were used during Russian Civil War because of the lack of spare parts and maintenance problems.
- Kolchak's white army received 65 aeroplanes and about 70 pilots.
- Also, former members of Imperial Russian Air Service joined Denikin's white army.
- After the start of the North Russia Intervention several former pilots of Imperial Russian Air Service joined the white forces in North Russia.

219 pilots who fought in Red Army during Russian Civil War were awarded Order of the Red Banner (16 of them were awarded twice). Almost all of them were former pilots of IRAS.

== Command structure ==
At the beginning of the war the basic Russian unit was the Otryad (or Squadron). Originally, these consisted of only six aircraft, but this was soon increased to ten, with two machines held in reserve. These Otryads were put together into Groups of three or four and, like their German counterparts on the Western Front, moved to strategic points on the Front where and when they were needed. Even larger groups of aircraft called Istrebitelnyi Divisyon (fighter wings) were attached to each Field Army.

== Constituent units of the IRAS ==
As the war progressed, aviation detachments were grouped into larger units:

- 1st Battle Aviation Group (1-я боевая авіаціонная группа): Founded 9 August 1916 on the Southwestern Front; contained:
  - 2nd Corps Aviation Detachment (2-й корпусной авіаціонный отрядъ)
  - 4th Corps Aviation Detachment (4-й корпусной авіаціонный отрядъ)
  - 19th Corps Aviation Detachment (19-й корпусной авіаціонный отрядъ)
- 2nd Battle Aviation Group (2-я боевая авіаціонная группа): Founded April 1917 on Southwestern Front to support XI Army; contained:
  - 3rd Corps Aviation Detachment (3-й корпусной авіаціонный отрядъ)
  - 4th Corps Aviation Detachment (4-й корпусной авіаціонный отрядъ)
  - 8th Corps Aviation Detachment (8-й корпусной авіаціонный отрядъ)
- 3rd Battle Aviation Group (3-я боевая авіаціонная группа): Founded April 1917 on Russian Empire's Western Front; contained:
  - 1st Corps Aviation Detachment (1-й корпусной авіаціонный отрядъ)
  - 11th Corps Aviation Detachment (11-й корпусной авіаціонный отрядъ)
  - 22nd Corps Aviation Detachment (22-й корпусной авіаціонный отрядъ)
- 4th Battle Aviation Group (4-я боевая авіаціонная группа): Founded June 1917 on Northern Front; contained:
  - 5th Fighter Aviation Detachment (5-й авіаціонный отрядъ истребителей)
  - 13th Fighter Aviation Detachment (13-й авіаціонный отрядъ истребителей)
  - 14th Fighter Aviation Detachment (14-й авіаціонный отрядъ истребителей)
  - 15th Fighter Aviation Detachment (15-й авіаціонный отрядъ истребителей)
- 5th Battle Aviation Group (5-я боевая авіаціонная группа): Proposed in August 1917, but never formed; to contain
  - 2nd Fighter Aviation Detachment (2-й авіаціонный отрядъ истребителей)
  - 6th Fighter Aviation Detachment (6-й авіаціонный отрядъ истребителей)
  - 7th Fighter Aviation Detachment (7-й авіаціонный отрядъ истребителей)

== Uniform ==
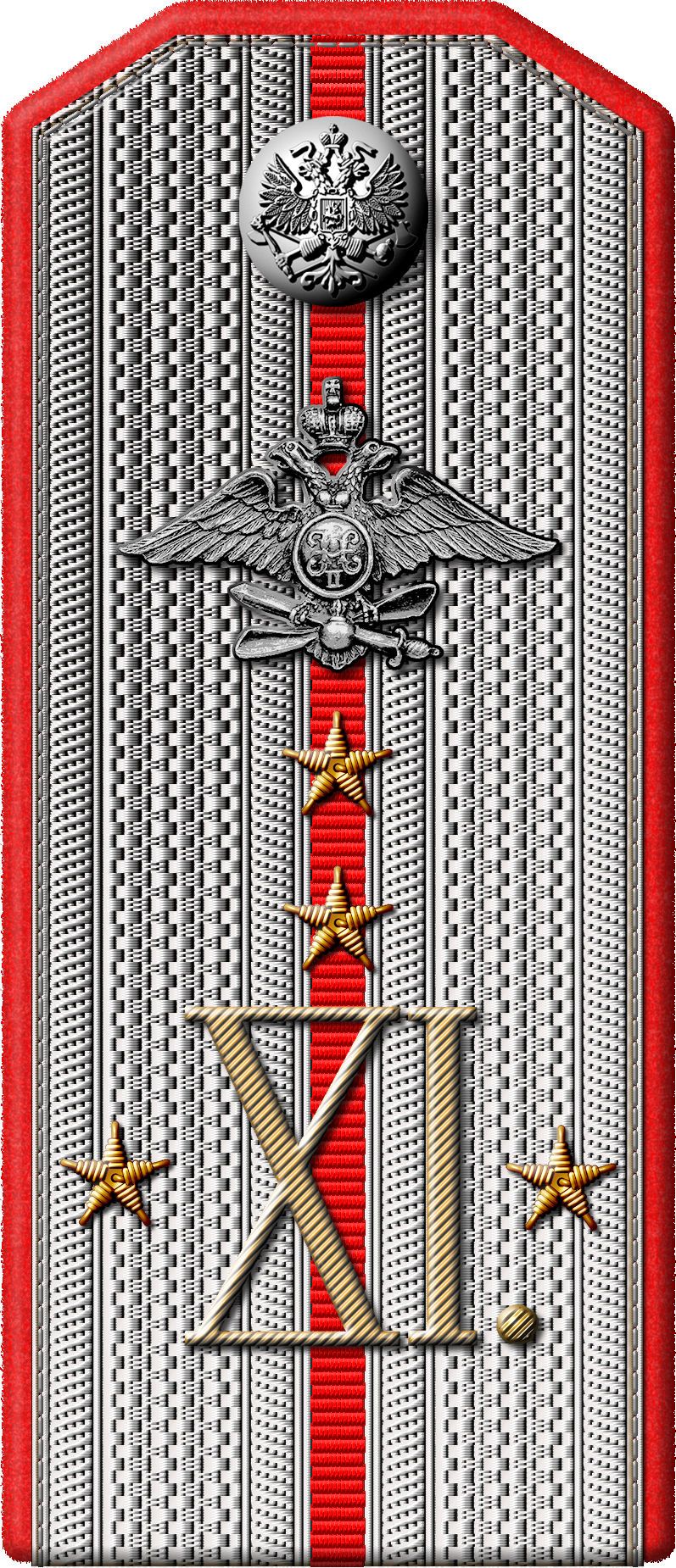
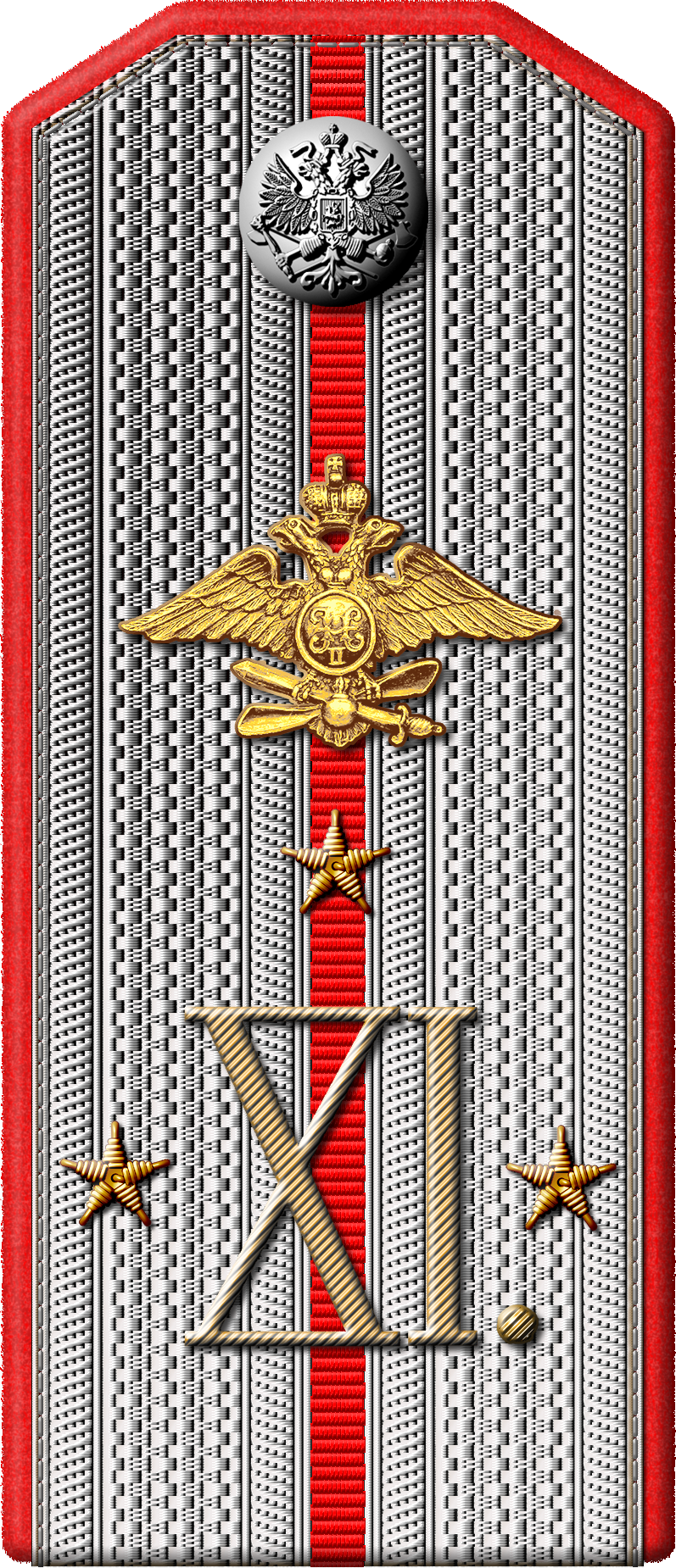
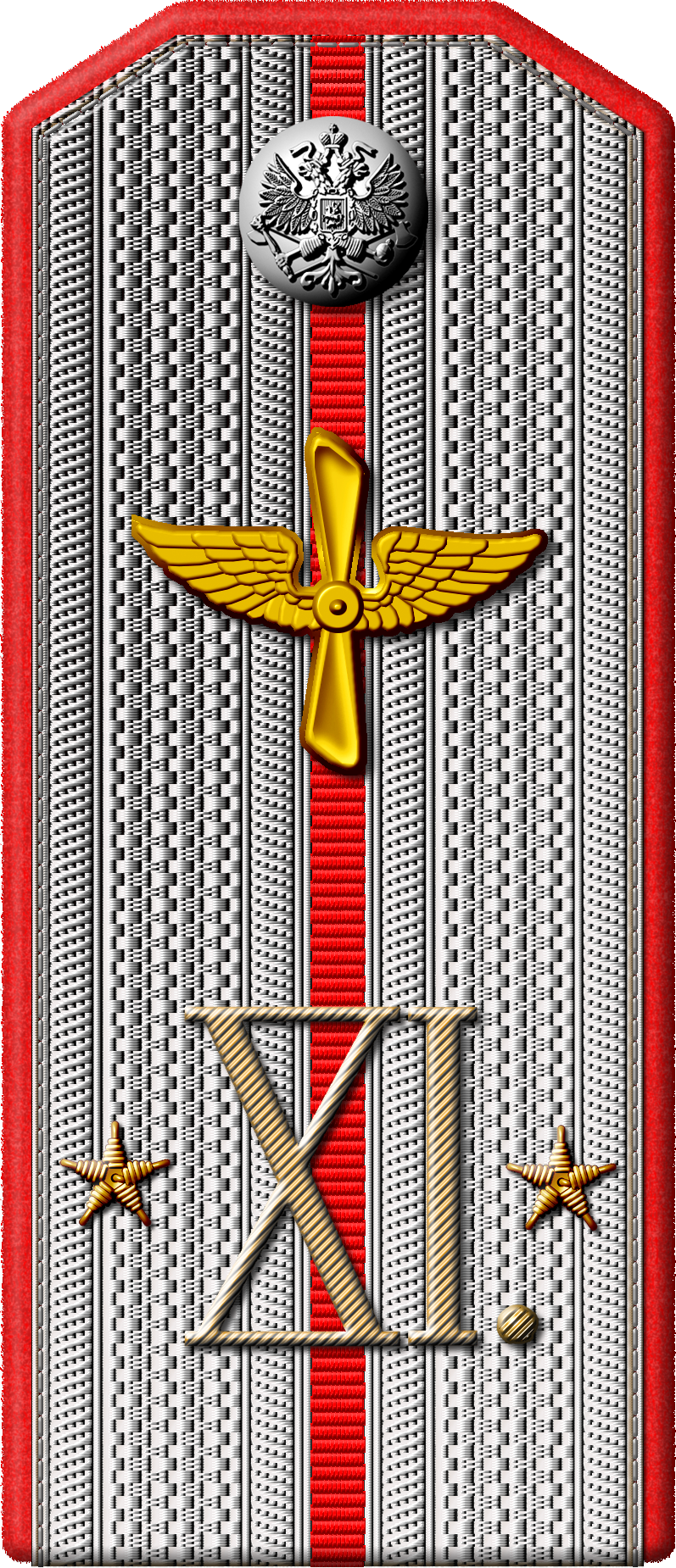
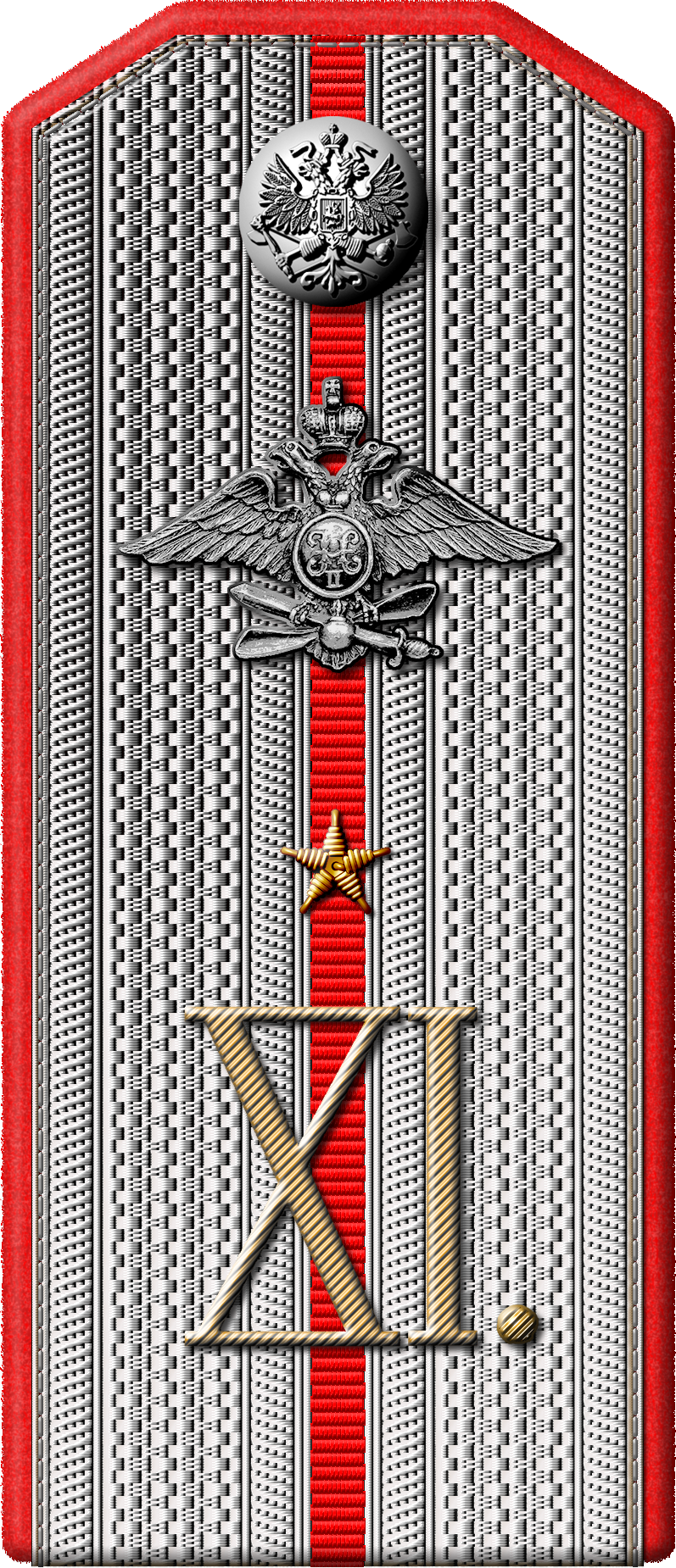
Description	Military rank insignia of the 11th Corps Aviation Detachment (1914)
Shoulder straps
Rank insignia, function	Shtabs-kapitan, Aircraft pilot (Staff Captain)	Poruchik, observer pilot (Lieutenant)	Podporuchik, Aircraft ground staff (Junior Lieutenant)	Praporshchik, Aircraft pilot (wartime only)
Groups	Ober-ofitsery (Upper officers, senior officer corps)

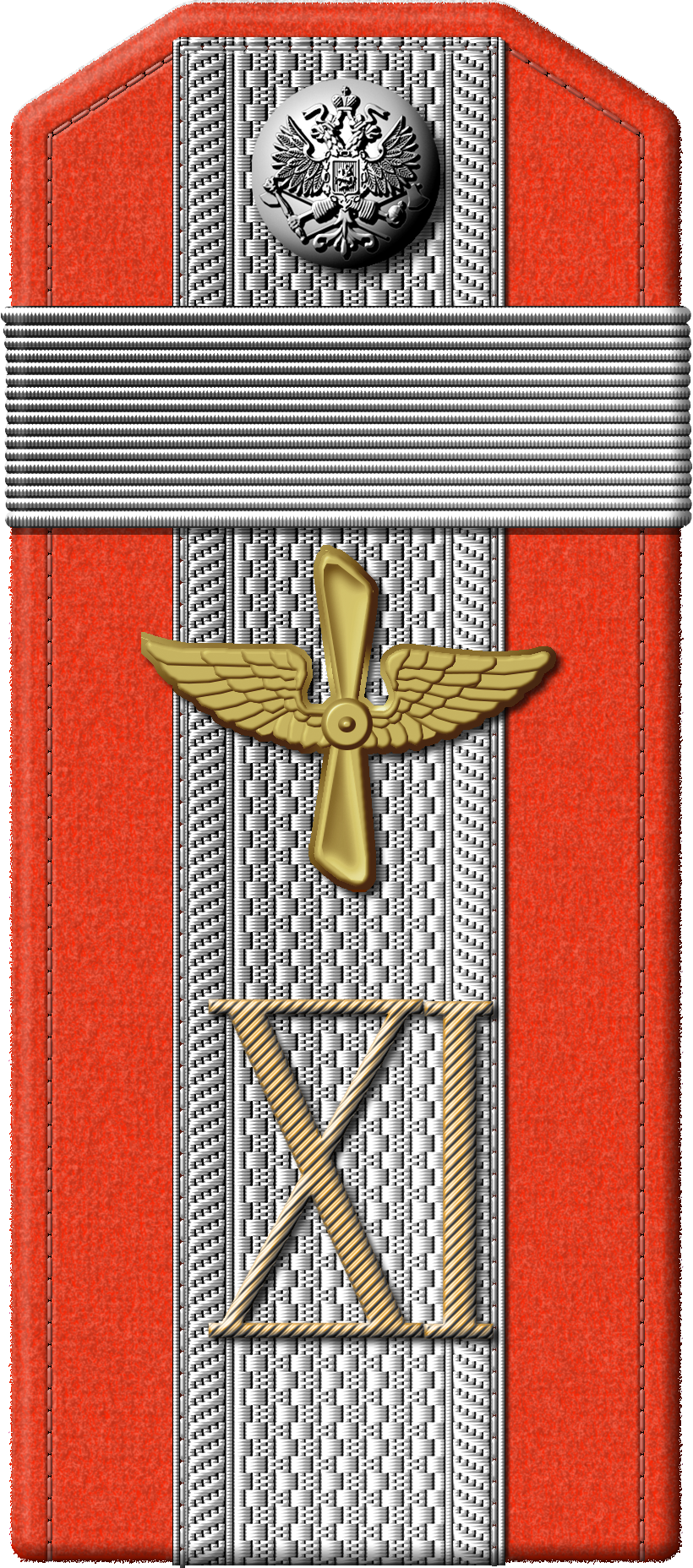
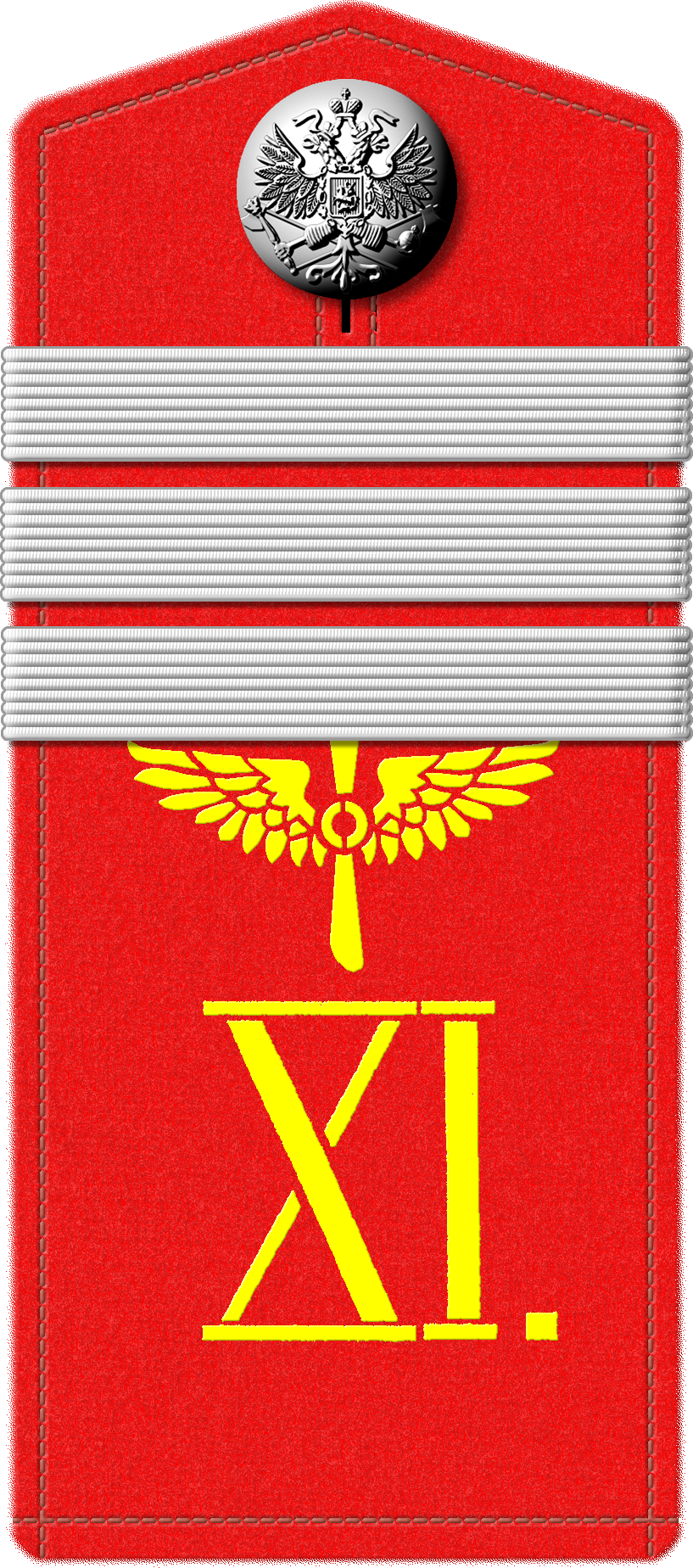
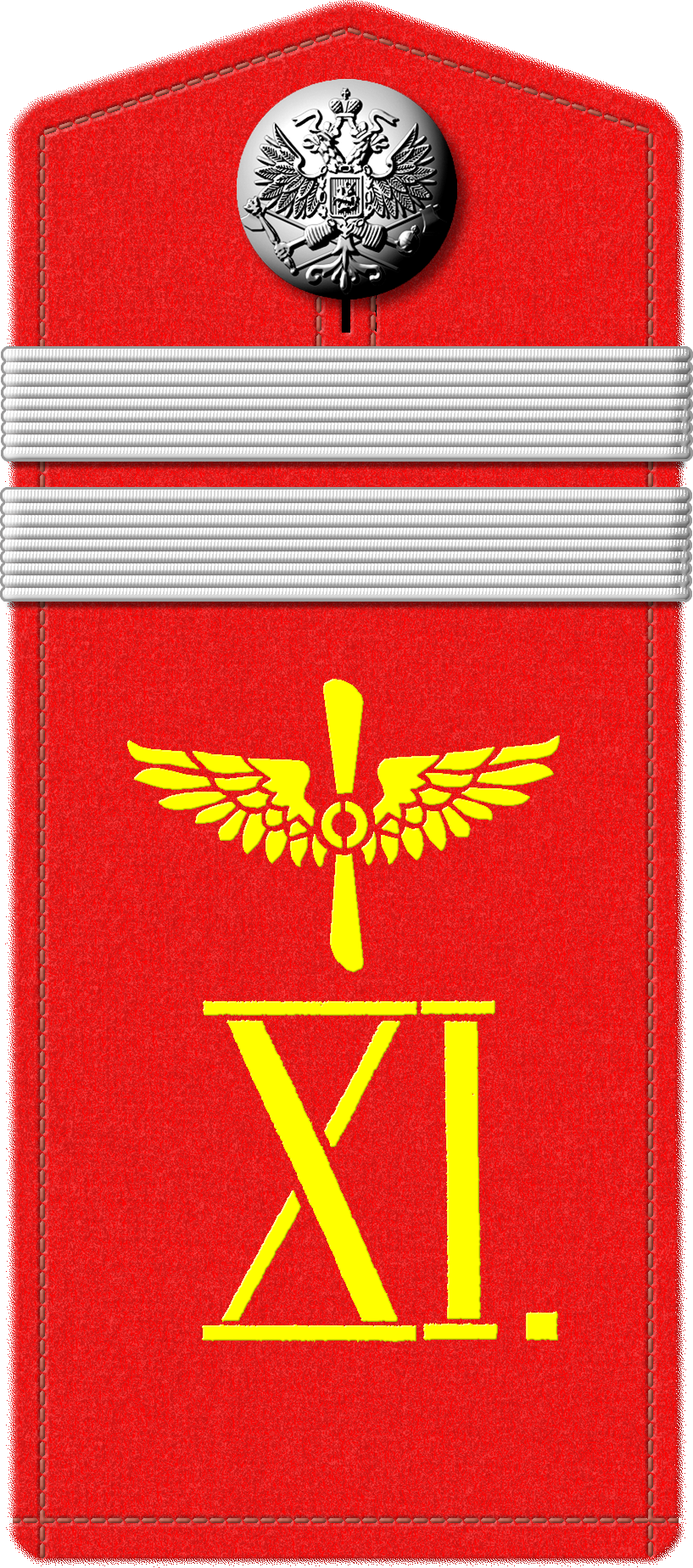
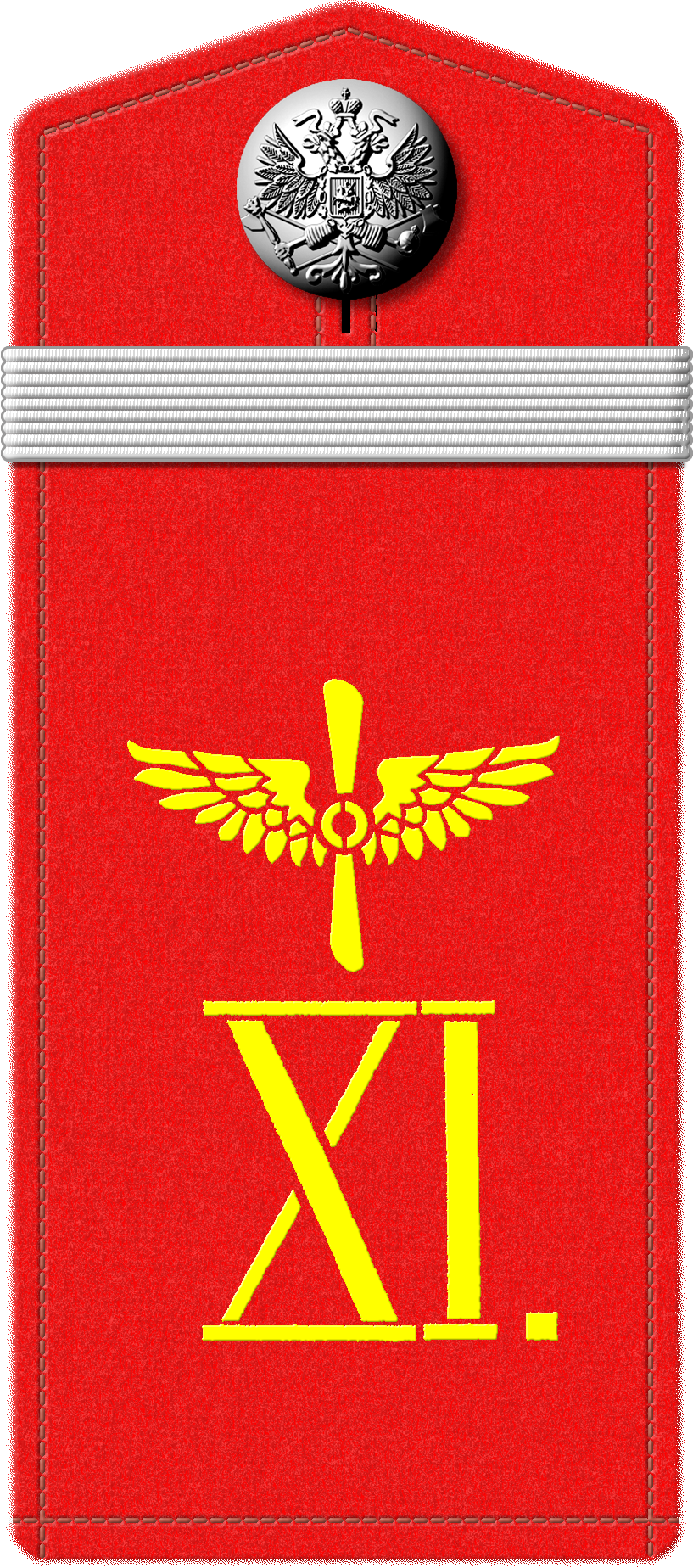
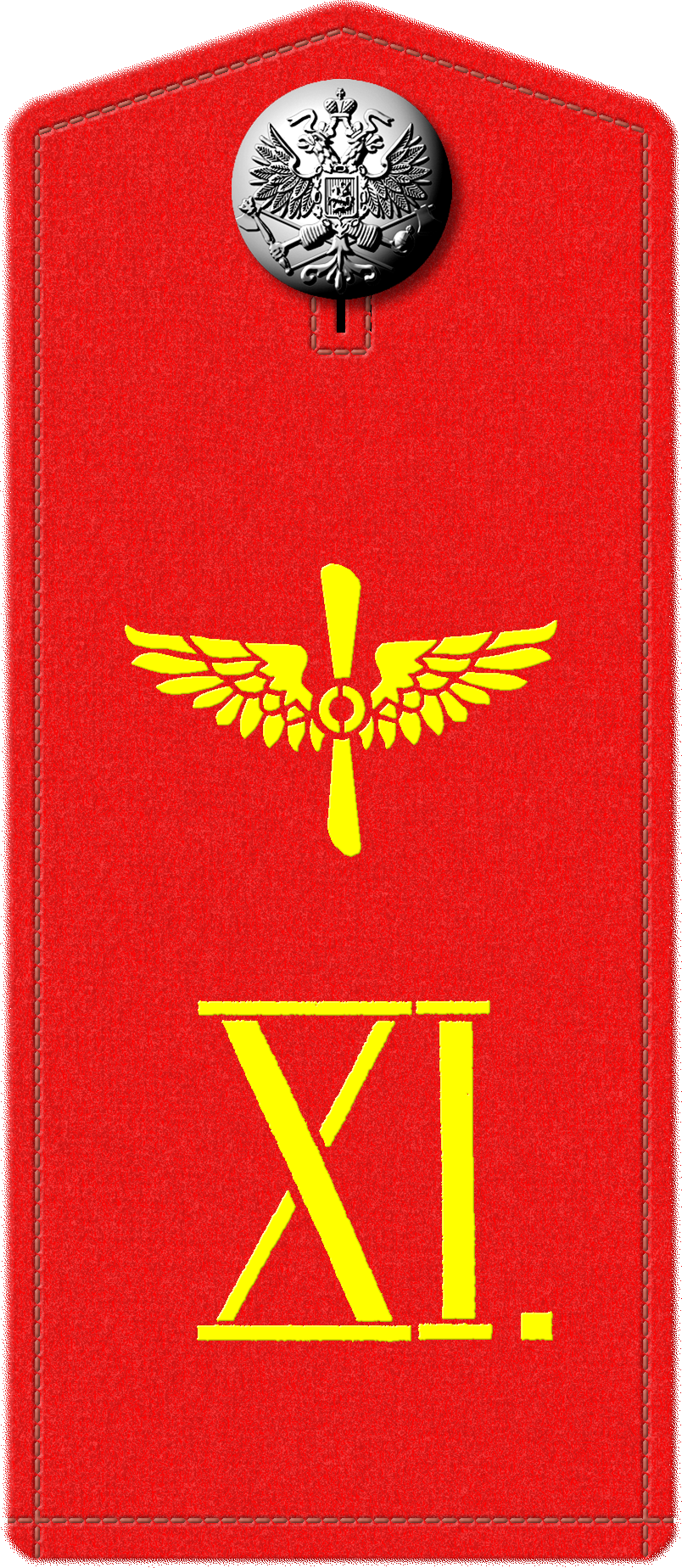
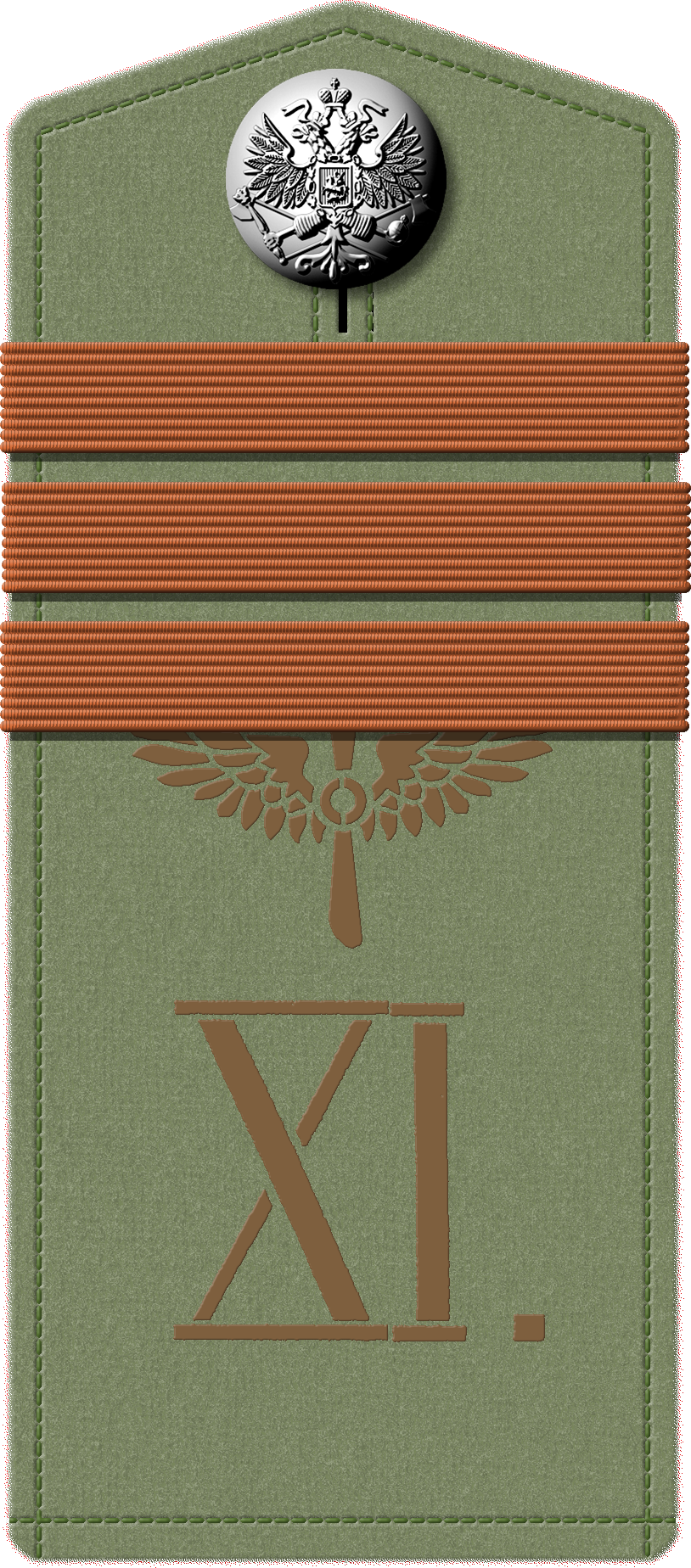
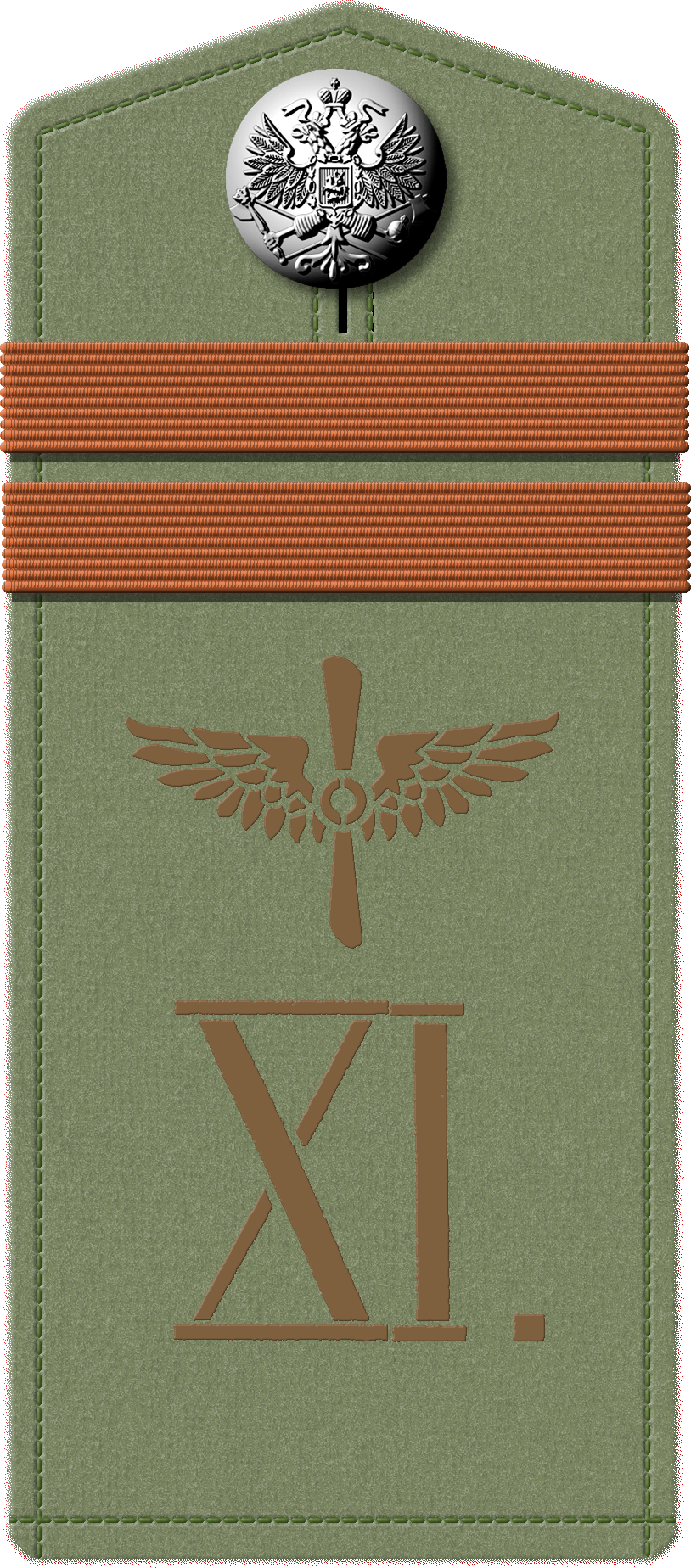
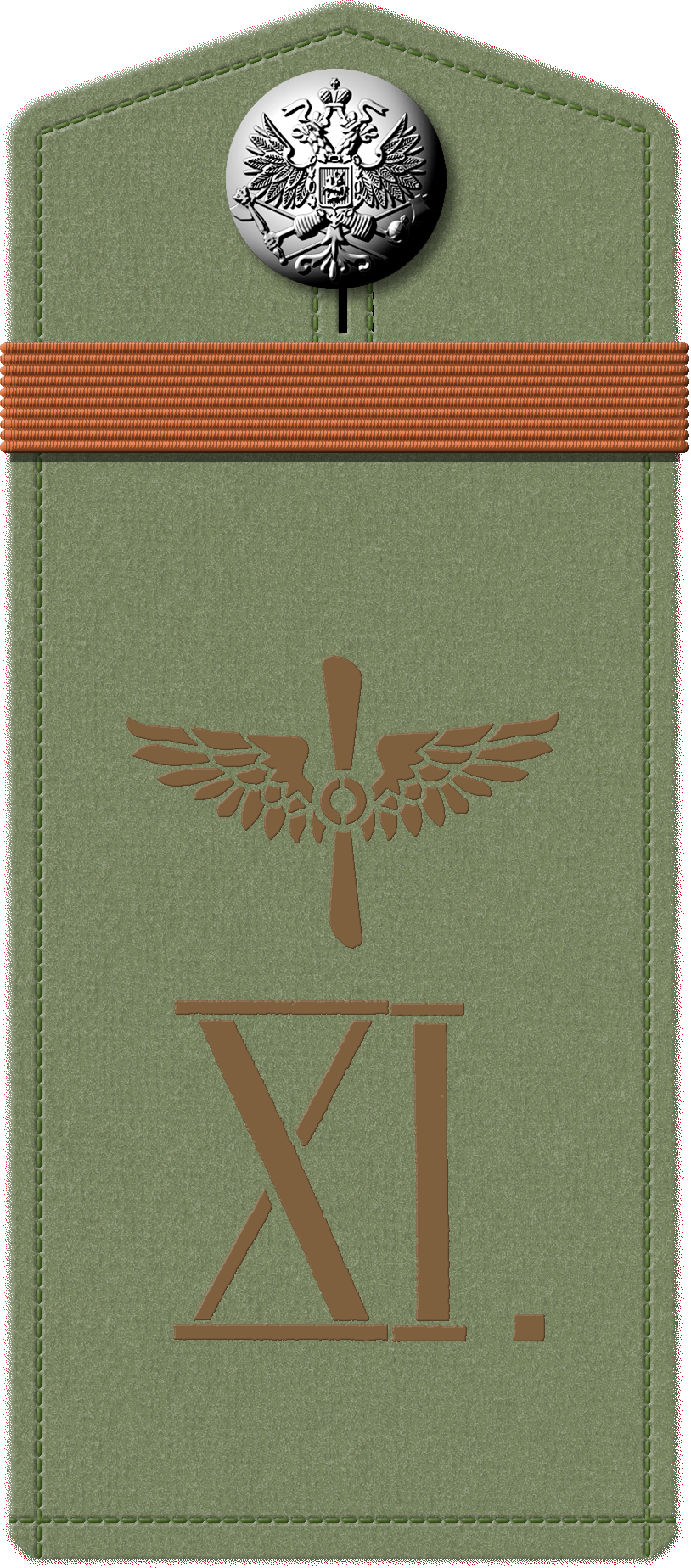
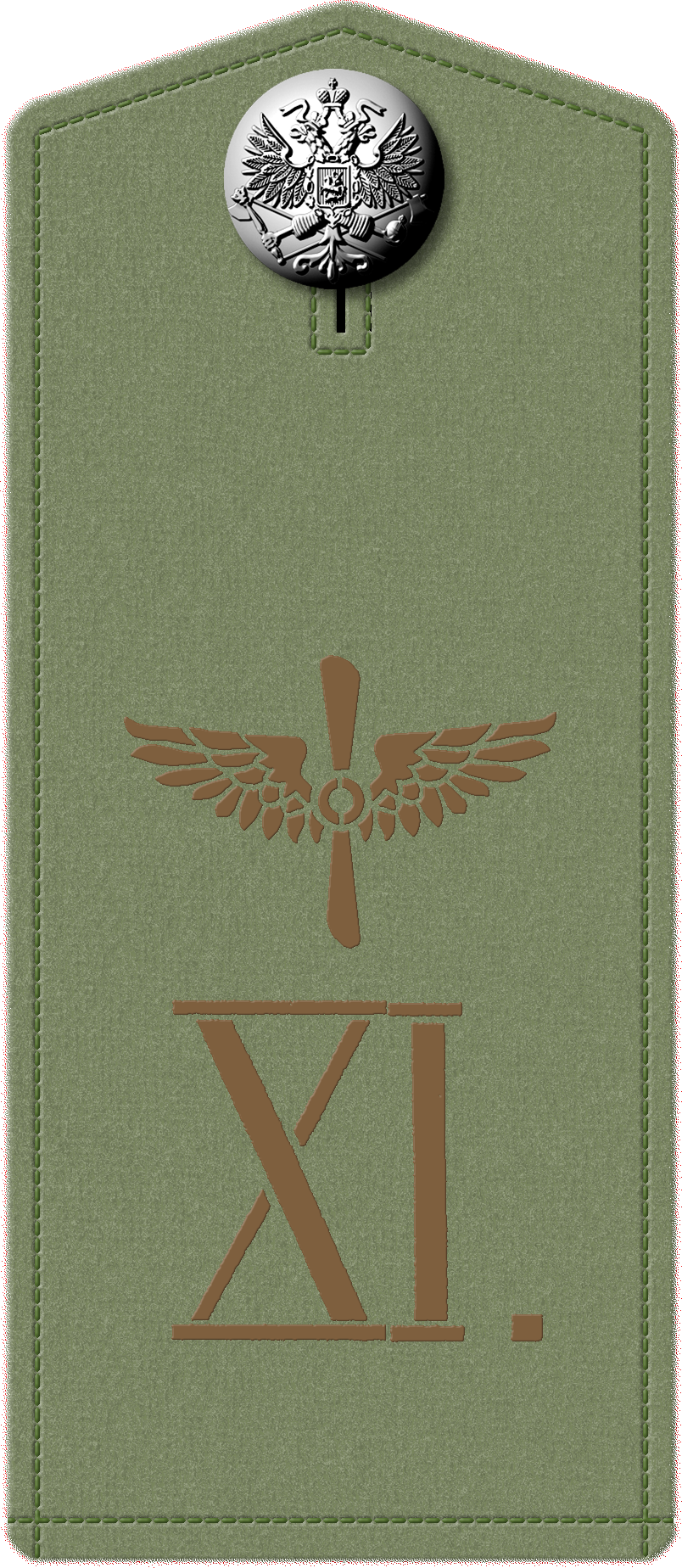
Description	Military rank insignia of the 11th Corps Aviation Detachment (1914)
Shoulder straps
Everyday shoulder straps
Rank insignia	Podpraporshchik on assignment Feldfebel	Starshy unter-ofitser (Senior Corporal)	Mladshy unter-ofitser (Junior Corporal)	Yefeytor (Gefreiter)	Ryadovoy (Private)
Groups	Unter-ofitsery (Under Officers/NCOs)			Ryadovye (Enlisted personnel)

== Production problems ==
In spite of Russia's need for airframes and engines, only about 5,600 aeroplanes were built in Russia before October 1917.

Much of this was due to the fact that Russian industry could not keep pace with demand. Imperial Russia did not possess the manufacturing capacity to produce engines and airframes in the numbers needed. Thus, the Czarist government relied heavily on imported engines and airframes from France and Britain. Russia's aircraft production slightly outpaced her Austrian opponent, who stayed in the war one year longer, produced about 5,000 aircraft and 4,000 engines between 1914 and 1918. Of course, the output of Russia and Austria-Hungary pale in comparison to the 20,000 aircraft and 38,000 engines produced by Italy and the more than 45,000 aircraft produced in Germany.

== Maintenance problems ==
In addition to construction problems, the Imperial Russian Air Service faced great difficulties in keeping the aircraft they did have in the air. Because it was so difficult to get new machines in a timely manner and because the Russians faced a shortage of aircraft for such a large front, the Russian high command kept out-of-date aircraft flying as long as possible. Thus, Russian pilots flew obsolete machines in combat throughout the war in the face of much better enemy aircraft. The fact that so many obsolescent machines remained in service produced Otryads that were an eclectic mix of aircraft; some front line, others nearly so, and some that should not have been flying. With so many different engines and airframes from French, British and Russian factories, trying to keep the machines flying was a constant challenge for Imperial ground crews. One report from the American War Department dated August 24, 1916, stated that, "The great majority of Russian machines are very dangerous to fly, due to the lack of proper over-hauling and having been tinkered with by inexperienced men. Lack of spare parts induced the Russians to fit magnetos and sparking systems to motors for which they were not built, and this makes the wear and tear excessive all around."

== The synchronization gear dilemma ==
The Imperial Russian Air Service, in common with other World War I air services, struggled to find a way of allowing a machine gun to fire safely through the spinning propeller of an aeroplane. The Russian High Command was tardy in realizing the necessity for arming its aircraft throughout 1914 and 1915, leaving frustrated aviators using such impromptu armaments as pistols, rifles, trolled anchors and cables, and other makeshifts. Part of the delay was caused by a paucity of light automatic weapons that an aircraft could lift. However, it became apparent that the ability to aim both gun and aircraft simultaneously was a great advantage in aerial combat.

In late 1915, Naval Lieutenant Victor Dybovsky of the 20th KAO invented a system of cam plates mounted on an engine's crankshaft that would prevent a machine gun from holing an aeroplane's propeller. Static tests at the Lux Aircraft Works proved its feasibility by November 1915; towards the end of the month, Morane-Saulnier G serial no. MS567 was forwarded to the 30th KAO for field testing. Poruchik Mikhail Shadsky flew test flights on both 9 and 29 December; cold thickened the machine gun's lubricant both times, preventing it from firing.

When testing restarted in April 1916, Shadsky had more success. During April and May, he engaged the enemy about ten times. He shot down Austro-Hungarian aircraft on May 23 and 24 1916, but crashed to his death and his machine's destruction after the latter encounter. However, production of the interrupter gear was never carried out. Instead, Dybovsky was posted to England to inspect aircraft being constructed by the Royal Flying Corps. While in Britain he worked on a true synchronization gear with the British inventor Scarff; this became the "Scarff-Dibovski" system used by the British. Thus it was that by April 1917, Russian had only a couple of dozen fighter aircraft with synchronized guns.

In the interim, praporshchik Victor Kulebakin was installing cam deflectors on another Morane-Saulnier's crankshaft. Testing in July 1917 showed that the deflectors did indeed pop out from under the aircraft's cowling to deflect any bullets that threatened the propeller. Although the modification was simple enough it could be fabricated in a unit's workshops, it was not widely used.

== Aircraft ==
=== Fighters ===
- Morane-Saulnier H
- Morane-Saulnier L
- Morane-Saulnier N
- Morane-Saulnier I
- Morane-Saulnier V
- Sikorsky S-16
- Sikorsky S-20
- Nieuport 10
- Nieuport 11
- Nieuport 12
- Nieuport 16
- Nieuport 17
- Nieuport 21
- Nieuport 23
- Nieuport 24
- Nieuport 24bis
- Nieuport 27
- SPAD S.A-2 & -4
- SPAD S.VII
- Sopwith Triplane
- Vickers FB.19

=== Reconnaissance ===
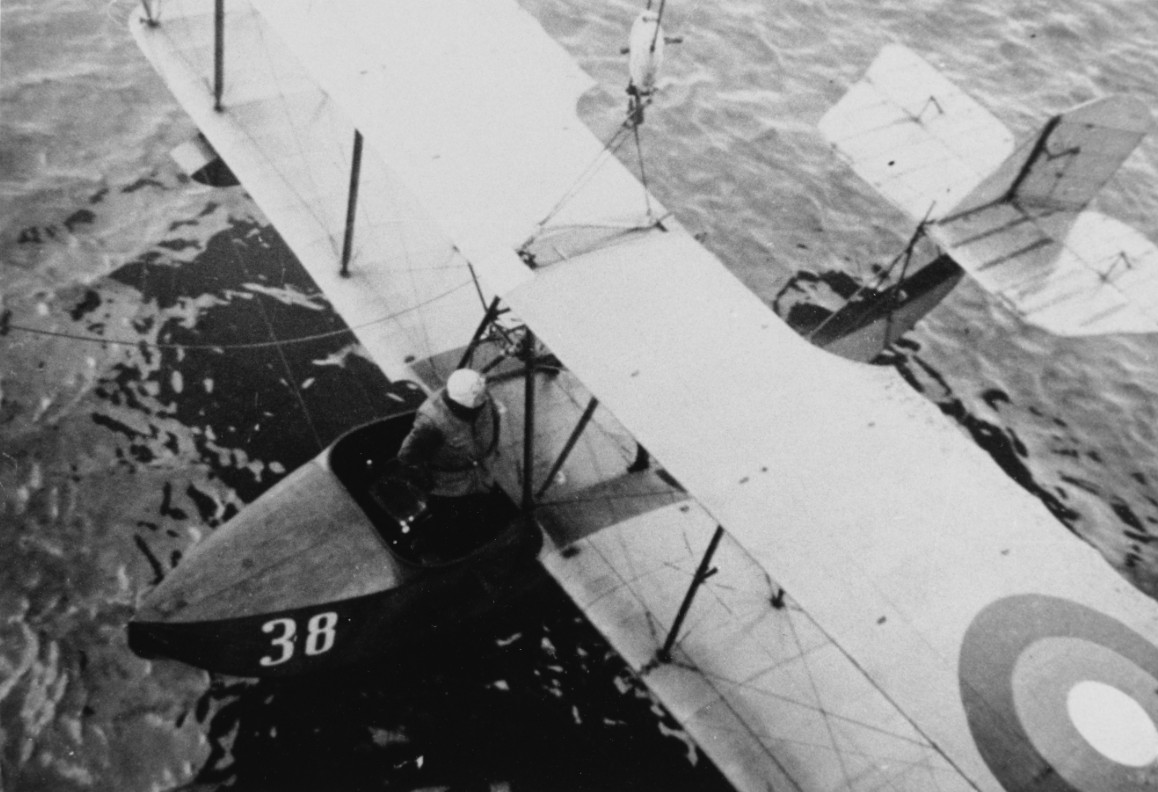
An M-5 in the Black Sea around 1915 during World War I

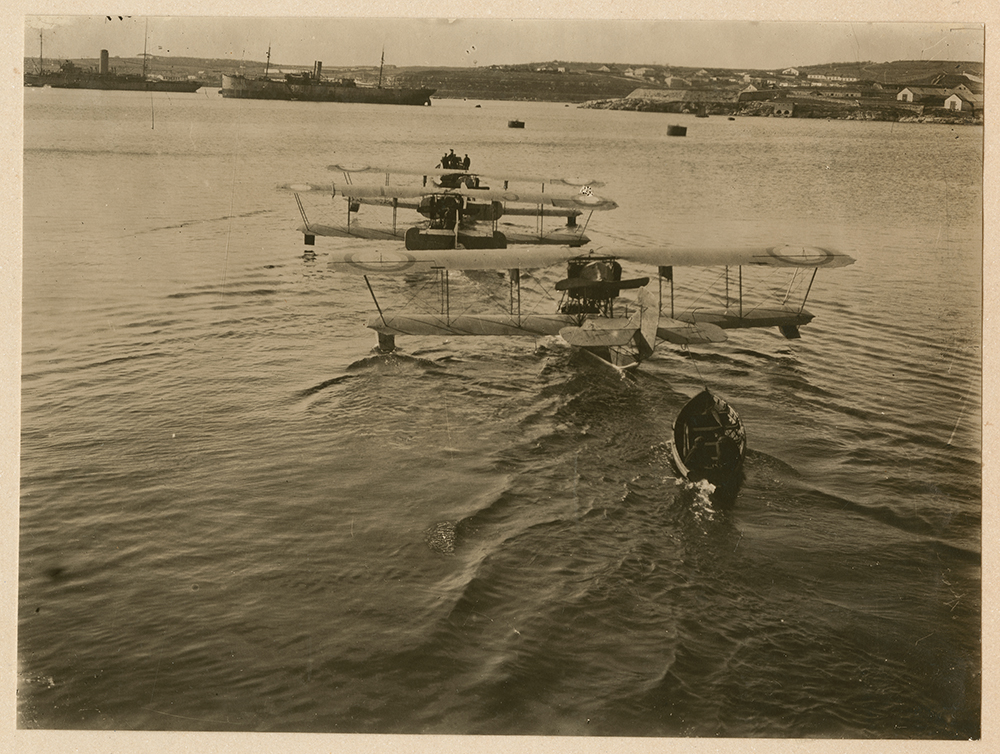
Grigorovich M-9 flying boats in Sevastopol, Crimea

- Anatra D
- Anatra DS
- Curtiss F
- Deperdussin TT
- FBA Type C
- Grigorovich M-5
- Grigorovich M-9
- Grigorovich M-11
- Grigorovich M-15
- Farman HF.20
- Morane-Saulnier G
- Maurice Farman MF.11
- Lebed VII
- Lebed XI
- Lebed XII
- Morane-Saulnier P
- Nieuport IV
- Nieuport VI
- Sikorsky S-10
- Sikorsky S-12
- Sopwith 1½ Strutter
- Voisin L

=== Bombers ===
- Sikorsky Ilya Muromets
- Voisin III
- Caudron G.4
- Avro 504

=== Trainers ===
- Bleriot XI
- Morane-Saulnier L
- Morane-Saulnier G
- Nieuport IV
- Nieuport 10
- Voisin III

== See also ==
- List of World War I flying aces from the Russian Empire
- List of Russian aviators
- List of Russian aerospace engineers

Military force of the Russian Empire:

- Imperial Russian Army
- Imperial Russian Navy

== Sources ==
- Blume, August. The Russian Military Air Fleet in World War I, Volume One. (Schiffer Publishing, 2010). ISBN 978-0-7643-3351-4.
- — The Russian Military Air Fleet in World War I, Volume Two. (Schiffer Publishing, 2010) ISBN 978-0-7643-3352-1.
- Chant, Christopher, Austro-Hungarian Aces of World War I, Osprey Aircraft of the Aces, #46 (London: Osprey Publishing, 2002) ISBN 978-1-84176-376-7.
- Durkota, Alan; Darcey, Thomas; Kulikov, Victor, The Imperial Russian Air Service: Famous Pilots & Aircraft of World War One (Mountain View, CA: Flying Machines Press, 1995) ISBN 978-0-9637110-2-1.
- Franks, Norman; Guest, Russell; Alegi, Gregory. Above the War Fronts: The British Two-seater Bomber Pilot and Observer Aces, the British Two-seater Fighter Observer Aces, and the Belgian, Italian, Austro-Hungarian and Russian Fighter Aces, 1914–1918: Volume 4 of Fighting Airmen of WWI Series: Volume 4 of Air Aces of WWI. Grub Street, 1997. ISBN 978-1-898697-56-5.
- Palmer, Scott W. Dictatorship of the Air: Aviation Culture and the Fate of Modern Russia. New York: Cambridge University Press, 2006. ISBN 0-521-85957-3.
- История воздухоплавания и авиации в СССР по архивным материалам и свидетельствам современников. Период до 1914 г. / ред. В. А. Попов. М., 1944
- Н. Я. Комаров. Военная авиация и средства ПВО России в годы первой мировой войны // журнал «Вопросы истории». No. 4, 1974.
- Юрий Гальперин. Рыцари неба // журнал «Вокруг света», No. 5, 1976. стр.66-71
- П. Д. Дузь. История воздухоплавания и авиации в России (июль 1914 – октябрь 1917 г.) 3-е изд., доп. М., "Машиностроение", 1989.
- Отечественная история c древнейших времен до 1917 года. Энциклопедия (в 5 томах) / отв. ред. В.Л. Янин. Большая Российская Энциклопедия, 1994.
- С. П. Елисеев. Развитие авиации русской армии в Первой мировой войне // «Военно-исторический журнал», No. 2, 2008.
