= Albatros B.I =

German military reconnaissance aircraft

B.I
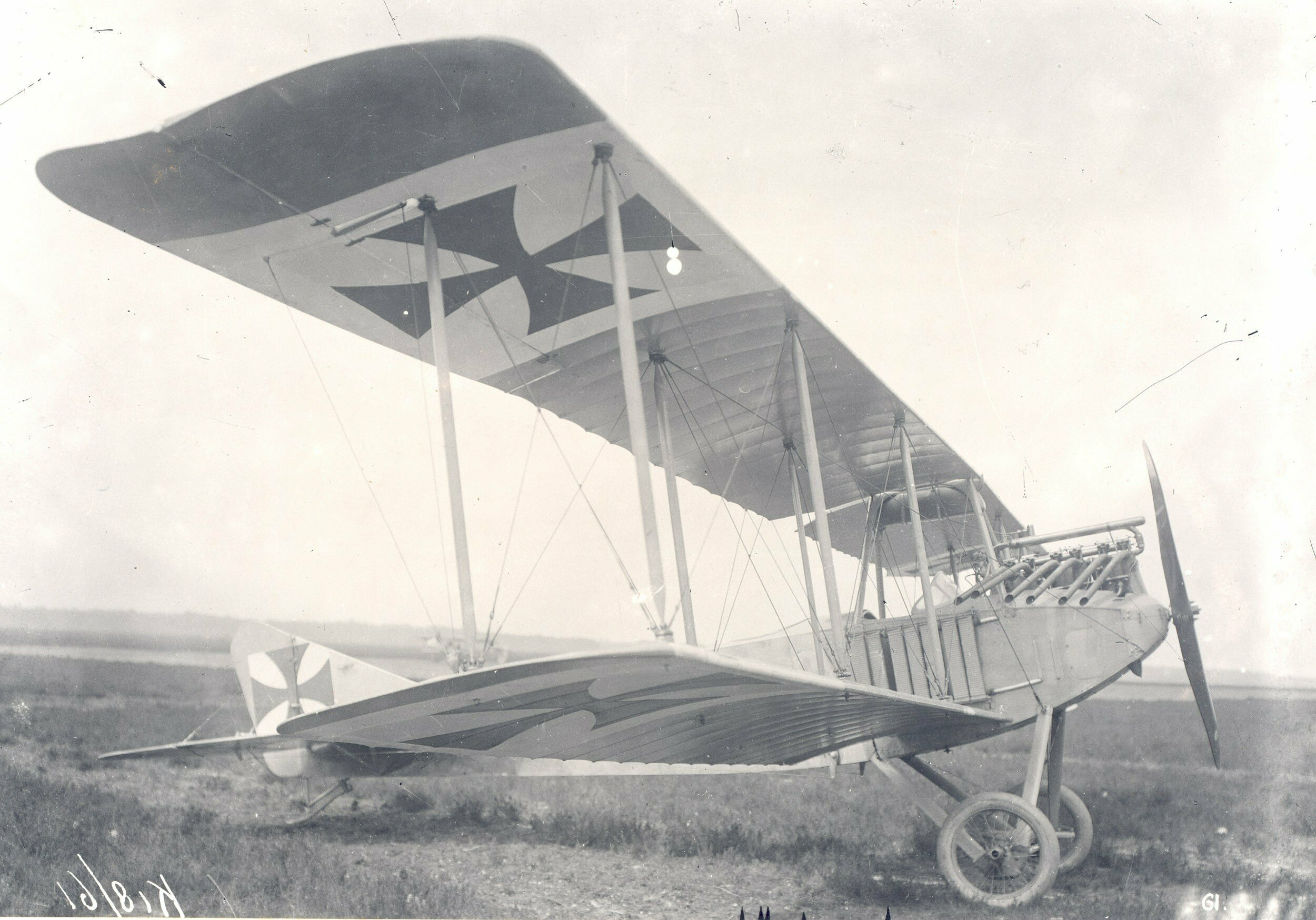
- Albatros B.I

General information
- Type: Reconnaissance aircraft
- Manufacturer: Albatros Flugzeugwerke
- Primary user: Luftstreitkräfte

The Albatros B.I, (post-war company designation L.1) was a German military reconnaissance aircraft designed in 1913 and used during World War I.

== Design and development ==
The B.I was a two-seat biplane of conventional configuration that seated the observer and the pilot in separate cockpits in tandem. The wings were originally of three-bay design, but were later changed to a two-bay, unstaggered configuration; featuring a typical aileron control cable system for German aircraft of the time, that allowed for a horizontal control horn that fitted into a structural pocket in the wing structure at neutral. A floatplane version was developed as the Albatros W.I.

== Variants ==
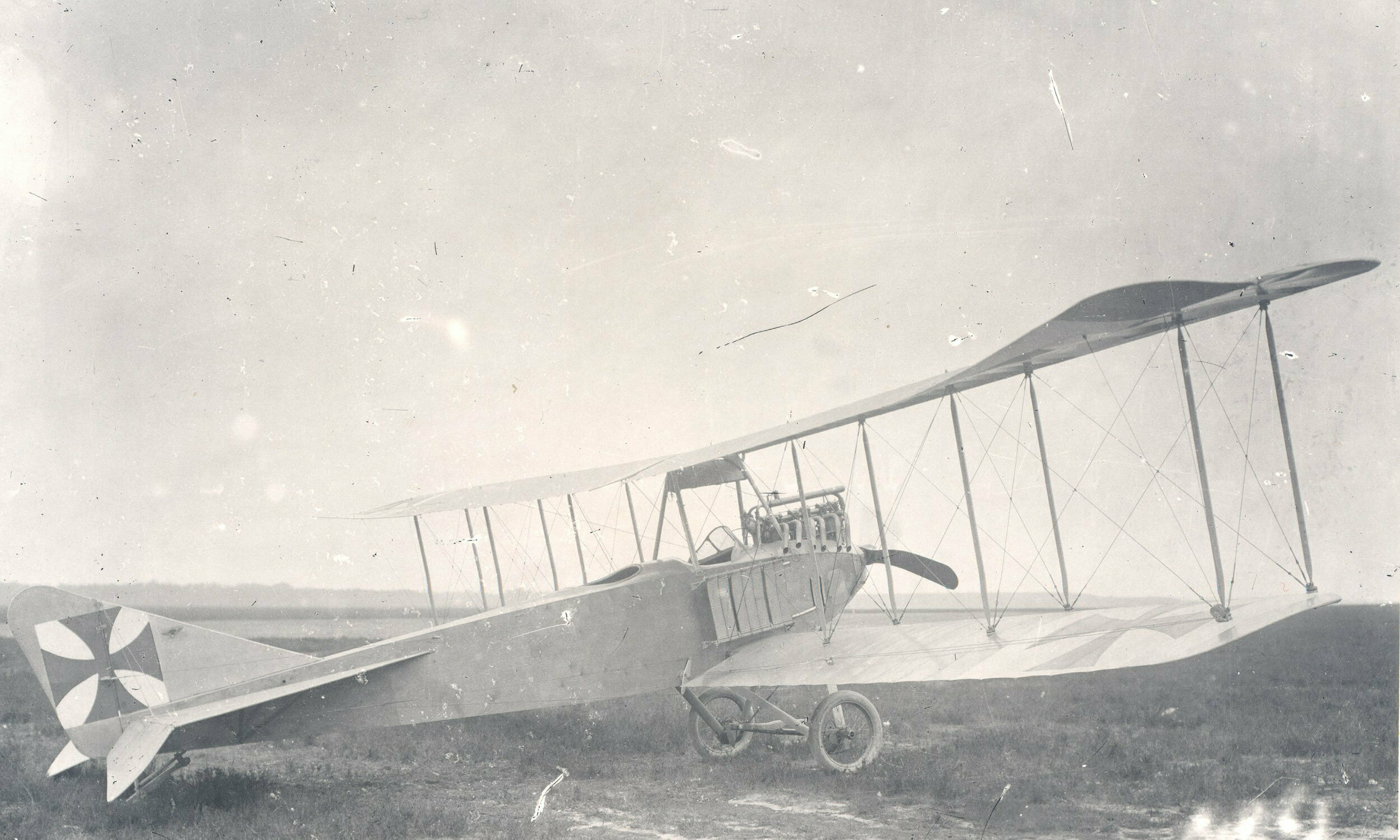
German Albatros B.I interned by the Dutch in April 1915.

B.I
German production aircraft for the Luftstreitkräfte
Phönix 20.01
First prototype for Austrian production.
Phönix 20.02
second prototype for Austrian production.
B.I(Ph) series 21
Production by Phönix Flugzeug-Werke AG at Vienna for the Austro-Hungarian Imperial and Royal Aviation Troops.
B.I(Ph) series 24
Production by Phönix Flugzeug-Werke AG at Vienna for the Austro-Hungarian Imperial and Royal Aviation Troops.
B.I(Ph) series 25
Production by Phönix Flugzeug-Werke AG at Vienna, with the KNV (Knoller Verspannung) for the Austro-Hungarian Imperial and Royal Aviation Troops; 48 ordered, reduced to 16 due to delays and persistent problems.

== Operational history ==
The B.Is were withdrawn from front line service in 1915 but some examples served as trainers for the remainder of the war.

== Operators ==
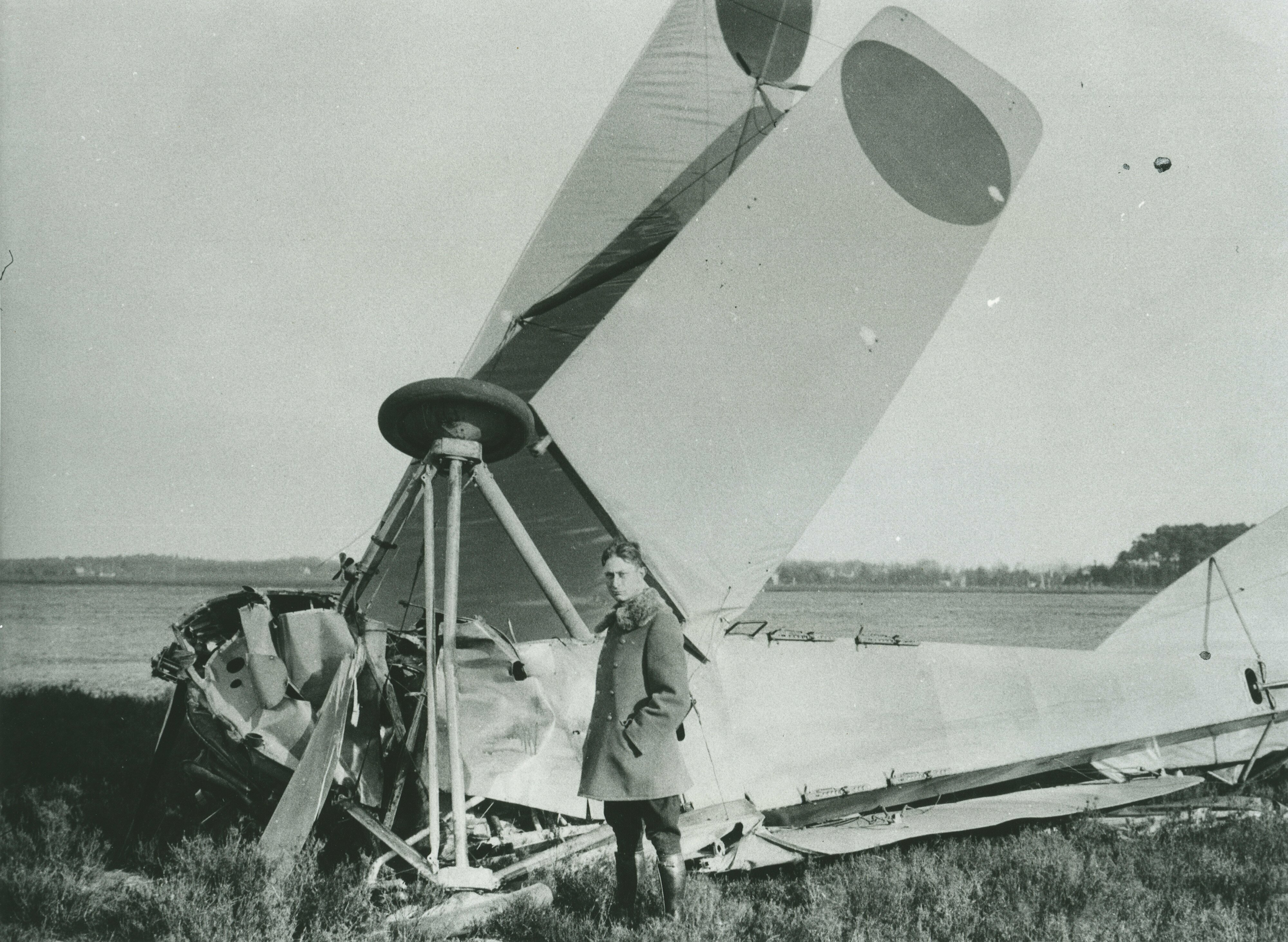
The apparent crash landing of an Albatros B.I of the Dutch Luchtvaartafdeeling (air force).

Austria-Hungary

- Austro-Hungarian Imperial and Royal Aviation Troops

Bulgaria

- Bulgarian Air Force

German Empire

- Luftstreitkräfte
- Kaiserliche Marine

Netherlands

- Royal Netherlands Air Force

Poland

- The Polish Air Force operated this type postwar.

Romania

- Romanian Air Corps – One Albatros purchased from Germany in 1913

Turkey

- Ottoman Air Force

== Surviving aircraft ==
The Phönix 20.01, prototype for Austrian production of the Albatros B.I(Ph), is preserved at the Heeresgeschichtliches Museum in Vienna.

== Specifications (B.I) ==
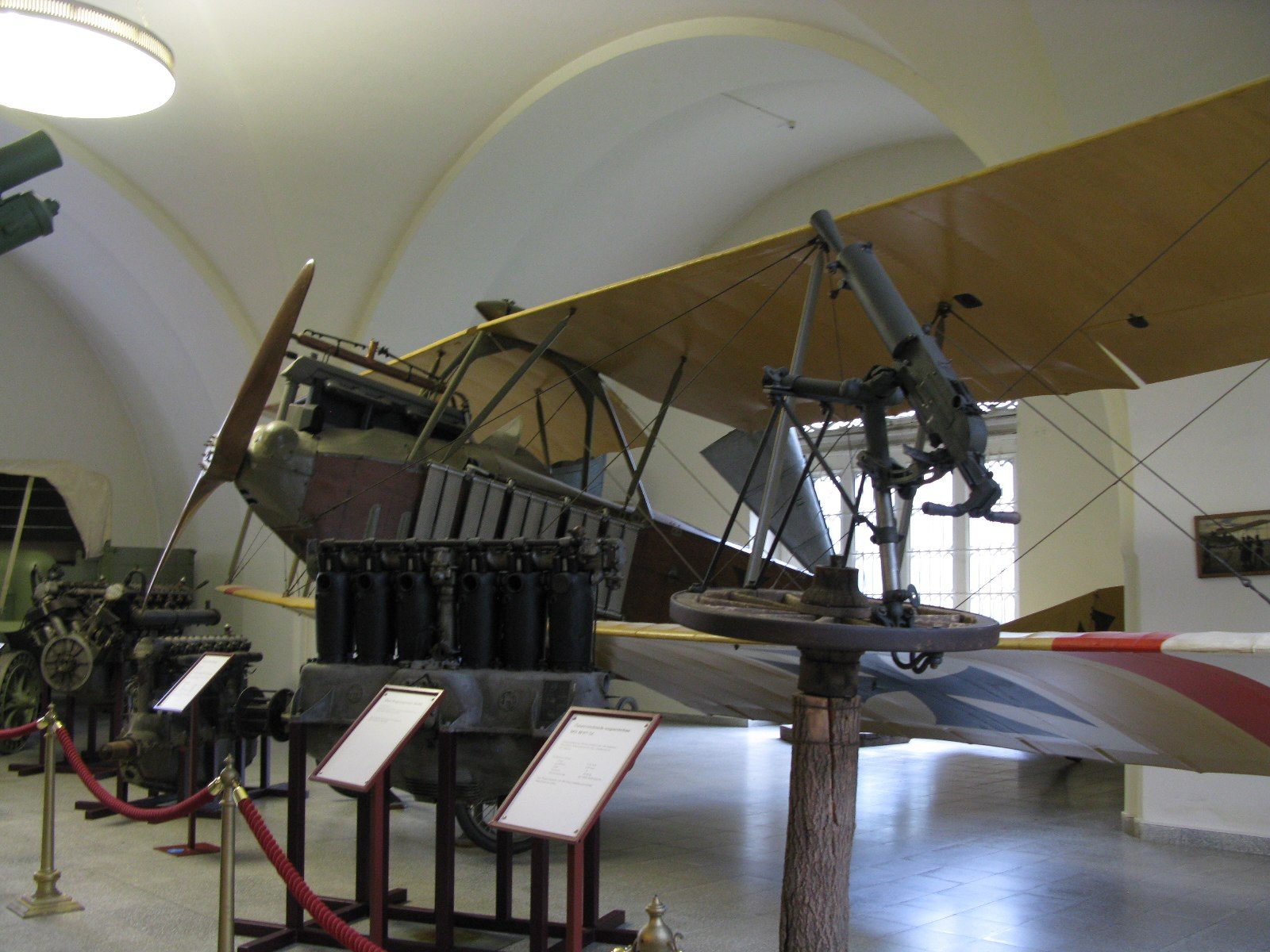
Phönix 20.01:Prototype for Austrian production of the Albatros B.I(Ph)

Data from German aircraft of the First World War

General characteristics

- Crew: 2
- Length: 8.57 m (28 ft 1 in)
- Wingspan: 14.48 m (47 ft 6 in)
- Height: 3.15 m (10 ft 4 in)
- Empty weight: 747 kg (1,647 lb)
- Gross weight: 1,080 kg (2,381 lb)
- Powerplant: 1 × Mercedes D.I 6-cylinder water-cooled in-line piston engine, 75 kW (100 hp)
- Propellers: 2-bladed fixed-pitch wooden propeller

Performance

- Maximum speed: 105 km/h (65 mph, 57 kn)
- Range: 650 km (400 mi, 350 nmi)
- Endurance: ca 4 hours
- Time to altitude: 800 m (2,600 ft) in 10 minutes

== See also ==
Related development

- Albatros B.II
- Albatros B.III
- Albatros C.III
- Lebed XI
- Lebed XII

Related lists

- List of military aircraft of Germany

== Bibliography ==
- Herris, Jack (2016). Albatros Aircraft of WWI: Volume 1: Early Two-Seaters: A Centennial Perspective on Great War Airplanes. Great War Aviation Centennial Series. Vol. 24. n.p.: Aeronaut Books. ISBN 978-1-935881-47-6.
- Klaauw, Bart van der (March–April 1999). "Unexpected Windfalls: Accidentally or Deliberately, More than 100 Aircraft 'arrived' in Dutch Territory During the Great War". Air Enthusiast (80): 54–59. ISSN 0143-5450.
