= Vyacheslav Tkachov =

Russian pilot and general (1885–1965)

- Born: October 6, 1885; Kelermesskaya, Kuban Oblast, Russian Empire
- Died: March 25, 1965 (aged 79); Krasnodar, Russian SFSR, Soviet Union
- Military career
- Allegiance: Russian Empire; Kingdom of Yugoslavia
- Branch: Imperial Russian Air Service
- Service years: 1904-1934
- Rank: Major General
- Conflicts: World War I Russian Civil War

Vyacheslav Matveyevich Tkachov (Russian: Вячеслав Матвеевич Ткачёв; October 6, 1885 – March 25, 1965) was a Russian pilot, general and writer.

In 1913, Tkachov became a pilot of Imperial Russian Air Service.

In 1914, Lt. Vyacheslav Tkachov became the very first Russian pilot who shot down enemy aircraft with handgun. He attacked a German Albatros and shot the enemy pilot.

Later, Tkachov took part in the Russian Civil War.

== Honours and awards ==
- Order of Saint Stanislaus (May 1910)
- Order of St. Anna of the Third Class (February 1913)
- Order of St. Vladimir of the Fourth Class (February 1915)
- Order of St. George of the Fourth Degree (July 1916)
- Gold Sword for Bravery (September 1916)
- Distinguished Service Order (United Kingdom)

== Sources ==
- Blume, August. The Russian Military Air Fleet in World War I, Volume One. (Schiffer Publishing, 2010). ISBN 0764333518, 978–0764333514.
- — The Russian Military Air Fleet in World War I, Volume Two. (Schiffer Publishing, 2010) ISBN 0764333526, 9780764333521.
- А.В. Махалин. М. Ткачёв — участник и историк воздушных сражений Великой войны // Первая мировая война и участие в ней России. Часть II. М., 1994.
