= Lebed XII =

Type XII
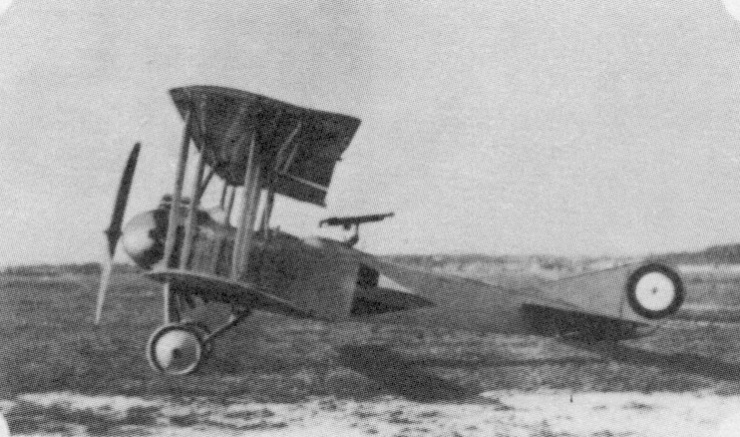

General information
- Type: Reconnaissance aircraft
- National origin: Russia
- Manufacturer: Lebed
- Primary user: Imperial Russian Air Force
- Number built: ca 216

History
- First flight: 28 December 1915

The Lebed XII was a Russian military reconnaissance aircraft produced during the First World War for the Imperial Russian Air Force. It was one of the few domestically designed aircraft to see production in Russia during the war, but was based on designs and techniques learned from Lebed's rebuilding of captured German types. The fuselage was a plywood structure of rectangular cross-section with seating for the pilot and observer in tandem, open cockpits. The wings were built around a pine spar and covered in fabric, and the empennage (tail assembly) was of welded steel tube with fabric covering.

== Development ==
Test flights commenced on 28 December 1915, but were interrupted by bad weather in St Petersburg, where the Lebed factory was located. Testing was therefore moved to Kiev, and then to the Anatra factory at Odessa on 11–15 February 1916. Grand Duke Alexander Mikhailovich ordered 400 aircraft on February 23, but the final contract on 19 April was for 225 aircraft, 245 sets of spare parts and 10 static airframes for a total of 5,153,500 rubles.

Before production began, a number of handling difficulties noted by the test pilots were being corrected in the design, along with a new set of problems caused by a change in powerplant. The prototypes had been flown with 97 kW (130 hp) engines, but the production contract called mostly for 112 kW (150 hp) engines, plus some machines equipped with 104 kW (140 hp) engines for training. These heavier powerplants shifted the aircraft's centre of gravity, and the mountings for the engine and cooling system had to be revised before a final round of tests began in October. Serial production finally commenced in November and delivery to squadrons soon afterwards.

The Lebed XII started appearing on the front line in quantity in early 1917, but problems quickly became apparent. In particular, a number of engine fires and crashes due to structural defects led to deliveries of the type being suspended by mid-year while an investigation was held. Army test pilots concluded that the version with the more powerful engine was unfit for frontline service, and recommended that it be relegated to training use only, while the lower-power version was regarded as not even fit for training. Lebed disputed the findings, blaming the poor results on the inexperience of the test pilots and on poor weather while the tests were conducted. The Army therefore held a second inquiry. On 2 October 1917, this panel concluded that the type was obsolete and unfit for service, recommending that production be halted and the type withdrawn altogether. However, due to a shortage of aircraft, production continued into 1918, and eventually 214 of the original order were delivered.

== Operational history ==
The Lebed XII saw limited frontline service in the North and North-western parts of the front with Germany, equipping four air divisions of the 38th Corps, 5th Army. Aircraft delivered in the second half of 1917 went mostly to training units, however. These included the Imperial aviation school, the Gatchinskoy military flying school, the Odessa flying school, Kiev school for pilots and observers and the flying school of the Caucasus. Over 50 were supplied to the Navy's school of air combat in Krasnoye Selo alone.

== Variants ==
- Lebed XII - main production type
  - Lebed XIIbis - two aircraft constructed with alternative engines - one with a Hispano-Suiza engine, the other with a Green
- Lebed XIII - high-speed version, anticipated to reach 150 km/h (94 mph). Planned for March 1916, but possibly not built.

== Operators ==
Estonia

- Estonian Air Force - One aircraft only.

Russia

- Imperial Russian Air Force

Soviet Union

- Soviet Air Force - Taken over from the Imperial Russian Air Force.

== Specifications ==
General characteristics

- Crew: Two, pilot and observer
- Length: 7.96 m (26 ft 1 in)
- Wingspan: 13.15 m (43 ft 2 in)
- Height: 3.25 m (10 ft 8 in)
- Wing area: 42.0 m^{2} (452 sq ft)
- Empty weight: 820 kg (1,800 lb)
- Gross weight: 1,350 kg (2,970 lb)
- Powerplant: 1 × Salmson water-cooled radial engine , 115 kW (150 hp)

Performance

- Maximum speed: 135 km/h (84 mph, 73 kn)
- Endurance: 3 hours 0 minutes
- Service ceiling: 3,500 m (11,500 ft)

Armament

- 1 × machine gun on flexible mount for observer
