= Victor Dibovsky =

Victor Vladimirovich Dibovsky
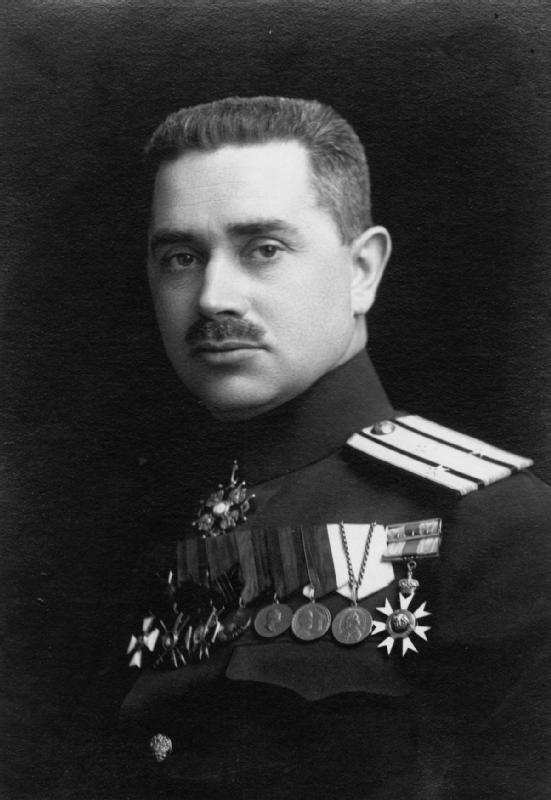
- Born: January 25, 1884; Smolensk, Russian Empire
- Died: December 29, 1953 (aged 64); London
- Military career
- Allegiance: Russian Empire
- Branch: Imperial Russian Navy, Imperial Russian Army
- Service years: 1901–1917
- Rank: Commander
- Unit: 20th Corps Air Detachment
- Awards: Order of Saint George, Order of Saint Vladimir, Order of Saint Stanislas, British Order of St Michael and St George

Victor Dibovsky (Russian: Ви́ктор Влади́мирович Дыбо́вский tr. Viktor Vladimirovič Dybóvskij; January 25, 1884 – December 29, 1953), was a Russian aviation pioneer.

== Early life ==
Victor Dibovsky was born in Smolensk into a gentry family. He started naval service in 1901, seeing action in the Russo-Japanese War, including the Battle of Tsushima. He served in Baltic Fleet and Black Sea Fleet of the Imperial Russian navy. He started studying aeronautics in 1909.

== Aviation career ==
Dibovsky was the first pilot to detect a submerged submarine in 1911., and first Russian to use radio on an aircraft. In 1912 he covered the distance between Sevastopol and St Petersburg in 25 flight hours, a record at the time. In 1913 he designed an airplane, “Dolphin”, remarkable for outstanding aerodynamic qualities.

== World War I ==
During World War I, Victor Dibovsky fought in the 20 Corps aviation group, earning orders of St George (Russia's highest award for valour), St Stanislaus, St Vladimir and a number of medals. He was the inventor of the Scarff-Dibovski synchronization gear, used by the UK Royal Naval Air Service

In 1916 he was promoted to commander and came to London as the head of Russian naval air mission.

== Emigration and death ==
The revolution prevented Victor Dibovsky from coming back to Russia. He lived in UK, France, USA and later in Britain again. He patented some new inventions and his research received media coverage. In 1953 he died of tuberculosis in London and was buried in a paupers’ grave at St Pancras and Islington Cemetery. In 2019, the place of his burial was marked with a memorial.

== Honours and awards ==
- Order of Saint Vladimir, 4th class
- Order of Saint Stanislaus (House of Romanov), 3rd and 2nd class
- Order of St. George, 4th class
- Order of St Michael and St George
