= Lebed XI =

Type XI

General information
- Type: Reconnaissance aircraft
- National origin: Russia
- Manufacturer: Lebed
- Primary user: Imperial Russian Air Force
- Number built: ca 10-12

Lebed XI was the designation applied to a number of reconnaissance aircraft supplied to the Imperial Russian Air Force by the Lebed factory of St Petersburg during World War I. Rather than representing any one particular type of aircraft, or even aircraft of Lebed's own design, the designation covered a variety of different German Albatros aircraft that had been brought down behind Russian lines and captured.

== History ==
The St Petersburg Aviation Company began manufacturing Lebed XI based on aircraft captured by the Imperial Russian Air Service in 1915. Lebed repaired or rebuilt these machines and returned them to service on the Russian side. A prototype was successfully air tested on December 28, 1915. While 225 aircraft were ordered, only ten Lebed XI aircraft were built and entered service for the Imperial Russian army air service. These were designed as reconnaissance and artillery airplanes and resembled the Albatros B-category biplane.

Several Russian aircraft were built based on the Lebed XI. These include the Lebed-LM1, Lebed XII, and Lebed XIII.

Subtypes from A1 through A8 were assigned to identify different Albatros designs supplied. As replacements for the damaged water-cooled engines used on the German aircraft were hard to come by, Lebed eventually fitted Salmson radial engines to some airframes.

== Operators ==
Russia

- Imperial Russian Air Force
