= List of aircraft by date and usage category =

This is a list of aircraft by date and usage. The date shown is the introduction of the first model of a line but not the current model. For instance, while "the most popular" aircraft, such as Boeing 737 and 747 were introduced in 1960s, their recent models were revealed in the 21st century.

== Civil aircraft ==
=== Civil air transport ===
Civil air transport
1903–1919	1920–1939	1940–1969	1970–present
Airco DH.4A; Airco DH.9C; Airco DH.16; BAT F.K.26; Bleriot II; Bleriot III; Blériot-SPAD S.27; Bleriot XI; Curtiss Eagle; Farman F.50P; Farman F.60 Goliath; Grahame-White Charabanc; Junkers F.13; Nieuport-Delage NiD 30; Potez SEA VII; Rumpler Taube; Sopwith Wallaby; Vickers Vimy Commercial; Westland Limousine; Wright Flyer; Wright Flyer II; Wright Flyer III	Airspeed Envoy; Albatros L 73; ANEC III; Armstrong Whitworth Argosy; Armstrong Whitworth Atalanta; Armstrong Whitworth Ensign; Avro 618 Ten; Avro 642 Eighteen; BFW M.20; Blériot-SPAD S.33; Blériot-SPAD S.46; Blériot-SPAD S.56; Boeing 40; Boeing 80; Boeing 247; Boeing 307 Stratoliner; Boeing 314; Boeing B-17 Flying Fortress; Breguet 26T; Breguet 280T; Breguet 393T; Bristol Ten-seater; Consolidated Commodore; Consolidated Fleetster; Curtiss Condor; Curtiss Kingbird; Curtiss Robin; de Havilland DH.18; de Havilland DH.34; de Havilland DH.50; de Havilland DH.66; de Havilland Dragon; de Havilland Dragon Rapide; de Havilland Express; de Havilland Fox Moth; Dewoitine D.332; Dewoitine D.338; Dornier Do X; Douglas DC-1; Douglas DC-2; Douglas DC-3; Douglas DC-4E; Douglas DC-5; Douglas XCG-17; Farman F.120; Farman F.190; Farman F.300; Focke-Wulf A 17; Focke-Wulf Fw 200; Fokker F.II; Fokker F.III; Fokker F.VII; Fokker F.XII; Fokker F.XVIII; Fokker F.XXII; Fokker F.XXXVI; Ford Trimotor; Handley Page Type W; Handley Page H.P.42; Handley Page Halifax; Junkers G 24; Junkers G 31; Junkers W 34; Junkers Ju 52; Junkers Ju 60; Junkers Ju 86; Junkers Ju 90; Junkers Ju 160; Junkers Ju 87 Stuka; Kalinin K-4; Kalinin K-5; Lockheed Vega; Lockheed Air Express; Lockheed Orion; Lockheed Electra; Lockheed Electra Junior; Lockheed Super Electra; Lockheed Lodestar; Martin M-130; Messerschmitt M 18; Messerschmitt M 24; Nieuport-Delage NiD 39; Nieuport-Delage NiD 640; Northrop Alpha; Northrop Delta; Percival Petrel; Rohrbach Roland; Short Empire; Short S.26; Sikorsky S-40; Sikorsky S-42; SNCASE Languedoc; Spartan Cruiser; Stinson Detroiter; Stinson Model A; Stinson Model T; Stinson Model U; Stinson Reliant; Supermarine Swan; Travel Air 6000; Udet U 11 Kondor; Vickers Vulcan; Vultee V-1; Westland Wessex; Wibault 280; Wibault 360; Zeppelin-Staaken E-4/20	Aérospatiale Corvette; Airspeed Ambassador; Antonov An-10; Antonov An-24; Aviation Traders Accountant; Aviation Traders Carvair; Avro Lancastrian; Avro Tudor; Avro York; Avro Canada C102 Jetliner; BAC 1-11; Beechcraft 90 King Air; Beechcraft A100 King Air; Beechcraft B100 King Air; Boeing 377; Boeing 707; Boeing 727; Boeing 737; Boeing 747; Boeing 2707 (project); Breda-Zappata BZ.308; Breguet Deux-Ponts; Breguet 941; Bristol Britannia; Bristol Type 223 (project); Canadair North Star; Cessna 402; Concorde; Convair 240; Convair 340; Convair 440; Convair 540; Convair 580; Convair 600; Convair 640; Convair 880; Convair 990; Curtiss Commando; Dassault Mercure; de Havilland Comet; de Havilland Dove; de Havilland Heron; de Havilland Canada DHC-2 Beaver; de Havilland Canada DHC-3 Otter; de Havilland Canada DHC-4 Caribou; de Havilland Canada DHC-5 Buffalo; de Havilland Canada DHC-6 Twin Otter; Douglas DC-4; Douglas DC-6; Douglas DC-7; Douglas DC-8; Embraer Bandeirante; Fiat G.12; Fiat G.212; Fokker F27 Friendship; Fokker F28 Fellowship; Grumman Gulfstream I; Handley Page Halton; Handley Page Hermes; Handley Page Dart Herald; Handley Page Hastings; Handley Page Herald; Hawker Siddeley HS 748; Hawker Siddeley Trident; Hughes H-4 Hercules; Ilyushin Il-62; Kawasaki Ki-56; Lockheed Hudson; Lockheed Constellation; Lockheed L-188 Electra; Lockheed L-1011 TriStar; Martin 4-0-4; McDonnell Douglas DC-9; McDonnell Douglas DC-10; McDonnell Douglas MD-11; McDonnell Douglas MD-80; McDonnell Douglas MD-90; Percival Pembroke; Piper PA-31 Navajo; Riley Turbo Skyliner; Saunders ST-27; Saunders ST-28; Saunders-Roe Princess; Savoia-Marchetti SM.95; Shin Meiwa Tawron; Short Sandringham; SNCASE Armagnac; Sud Aviation Caravelle; Tupolev Tu-104; Tupolev Tu-114; Tupolev Tu-144; Tupolev Tu-154; VFW-Fokker 614; Vickers VC.1 Viking; Vickers Vanguard; Vickers Viscount; Vickers VC-10; Yakovlev Yak-40; Boeing 720	ATR 42; ATR 72; Airbus A220; Airbus A300; Airbus A310; Airbus A318; Airbus A319; Airbus A320; Airbus A321; Airbus A330; Airbus A340; Airbus A350; Airbus A380; Antonov An-140; Antonov An-148; Antonov An-158; Antonov An-225; Beechcraft 200 Super King Air; Beechcraft 1300; Beriev Be-200; British Aerospace BAe 146; Boeing 717; Boeing 757; Boeing 767; Boeing 777; Boeing 787; Bombardier CRJ-100; Bombardier CRJ-200; Bombardier CRJ-700; Bombardier CRJ-900; Bombardier Dash 8; CASA C-212 Aviocar; Cessna 208; Cessna 404; Cirrus SR20; Cirrus SR22; Comac C919 (project); Convair CV5800; de Havilland Canada Dash 7; De Havilland Canada Dash 8; Dornier 328; Embraer EMB 121 Xingu; Embraer EMB 120 Brasilia; Embraer EMB 820C; Embraer/FMA CBA 123 Vector; Embraer ERJ 135; Embraer ERJ 140; Embraer ERJ 145; Embraer 170; Embraer 175; Embraer 190; Embraer 195; Fairchild Dornier 328JET; Fokker 50; Fokker 70; Fokker 100; Irkut MS-21 (project); Ilyushin Il-86; Ilyushin Il-96; Ilyushin Il-114; Indonesian Aerospace N-219; Indonesian Aerospace N-245; Indonesian Aerospace N-270; IPTN N-250; IPTN N-2130; McDonnell-Douglas MD-11; McDonnell Douglas MD-80; McDonnell Douglas MD-90; McDonnell-Douglas MD-95; Mitsubishi Regional Jet (project); Neiva Carajá; Piper Chieftain; Piper T-1020; Piper T-1040; Reims-Cessna F406 Caravan II; Short 330; Short 360; Sukhoi Superjet 100; Tupolev Tu-204; Yakovlev Yak-42; Saab 340; Saab 2000

== Military aircraft ==
=== Transport ===
Military – transport
1920–1938	1939–1945	1946–1969	1970–present
Airco DH.1; Airco DH.2; Airco DH.3; Airco DH.4A; Airco DH.5; Airco DH.6; Avro Anson; Bellanca C-27; Boeing C-18; Bristol Bombay; Consolidated C-11; Consolidated C-22; Curtiss C-10; Curtiss C-30; Douglas C-1; Douglas C-21; Douglas C-26; Douglas C-29; Douglas C-33; Douglas C-34; Douglas C-38; Douglas C-39; Fairchild C-8; Fairchild C-24; Fokker C-2; Fokker C-5; Fokkerrergugor C-7; Fokker C-14; Fokker C-15; Fokker C-16; Fokker C-20; Ford C-3; Ford C-4; Ford C-9; Handley Page H.P.54 Harrow; Junkers Ju 52; Kreider-Reisner XC-31; Lockheed C-12; Lockheed C-17; Lockheed C-23; Lockheed C-25; Lockheed C-36; Lockheed C-37; Lockheed C-40; Lockheed XC-35; Northrop C-19 Alpha; Sikorsky C-6; Sikorsky C-28; Vickers Type 264 Valentia; Vickers Vernon; Vickers Victoria	Lockheed C-66; Armstrong Whitworth Albemarle; Beechcraft Staggerwing; Boeing B-17 Flying Fortress; Boeing C-73; Boeing C-75; Boeing C-97 Stratofreighter; Boeing C-98; Boeing C-108 Flying Fortress; Bristol Beaufort; Budd C-93; Budd RB Conestoga; Cessna 165; Cessna C-77; Cessna C-78; Cessna C-94; Consolidated C-87 Liberator Express; Consolidated C-109; Consolidated Liberator I; Consolidated LB-30; Consolidated RY; Curtiss C-55; Curtiss-Wright C-76 Caravan; de Havilland Dragon; de Havilland Dragon Rapide; de Havilland Dragonfly; de Havilland Express; de Havilland Fox Moth; de Havilland Moth Minor; Douglas C-32; Douglas C-41; Douglas C-47 Skytrain; Douglas C-48; Douglas C-49; Douglas C-50; Douglas C-51; Douglas C-52; Douglas C-53 Skytrooper; Douglas C-54 Skymaster; Douglas C-58; Douglas C-67; Douglas C-68; Douglas C-68; Douglas C-74 Globemaster; Douglas C-84; Douglas DC-2; Douglas DC-3; Douglas Dolphin; Douglas R4D; Douglas XCG-17; Fairchild 24; Fairchild C-61; Fairchild C-82 Packet; Fairchild C-86; Fairchild C-88; Fairchild C-96; Ford Trimotor; Funk C-92; Hamilton C-89; Handley Page Halifax; Harlow C-80; Howard C-70; Howard C-70A; Hughes H-4 Hercules; Junkers C-79; Junkers G 31; Junkers W34; Lisunov Li-2; Lockheed C-56; Lockheed C-57; Lockheed C-59; Lockheed C-60; Lockheed C-63; Lockheed C-69 Constellation; Lockheed C-85; Lockheed Model 18 Lodestar; Lockheed Vega; Luscombe C-90; Martin JRM Mars; Messerschmitt Me 321; Messerschmitt Me 323; Miles Falcon; Miles Merlin; Miles Hawk; Noorduyn Norseman; Noorduyn C-64; Percival Proctor; Piper C-83; Short Empire; Short Stirling; Showa/Nakajima L2D; Spartan C-71; Stinson C-81; Stinson C-91; Stinson Reliant; Stinson Vigilant; Stout C-65; Taylorcraft C-95; Tugan Gannet; Waco C-62; Waco C-72	Antonov An-12; Antonov An-22; Antonov An-24; Antonov An-26; de Havilland Devon; de Havilland Dove; de Havilland Heron; de Havilland Sea Devon; de Havilland Sea Heron; de Havilland Canada DHC-2 Beaver; de Havilland Canada DHC-3 Otter; de Havilland Canada DHC-4 Caribou; de Havilland Canada DHC-5 Buffalo; de Havilland Canada DHC-6 Twin Otter; Douglas C-124 Globemaster II; Douglas C-133 Cargomaster; Grumman C-1 Trader; Grumman C-2 Greyhound; Lockheed C-130 Hercules; Lockheed C-121 Constellation; Lockheed C-141 Starlifter	Antonov An-32; Antonov An-124; Airbus A400M; Antonov An-225; Boeing C-17 Globemaster III; Ilyushin Il-76; Lockheed C-5 Galaxy; Shaanxi Y-8; Y-8D; Xian Y-20; Alenia C-27J Spartan; Antonov An-225 Mriya; Boeing C-135 Stratolifter
