= General Aviation GA-43 =

GA-43
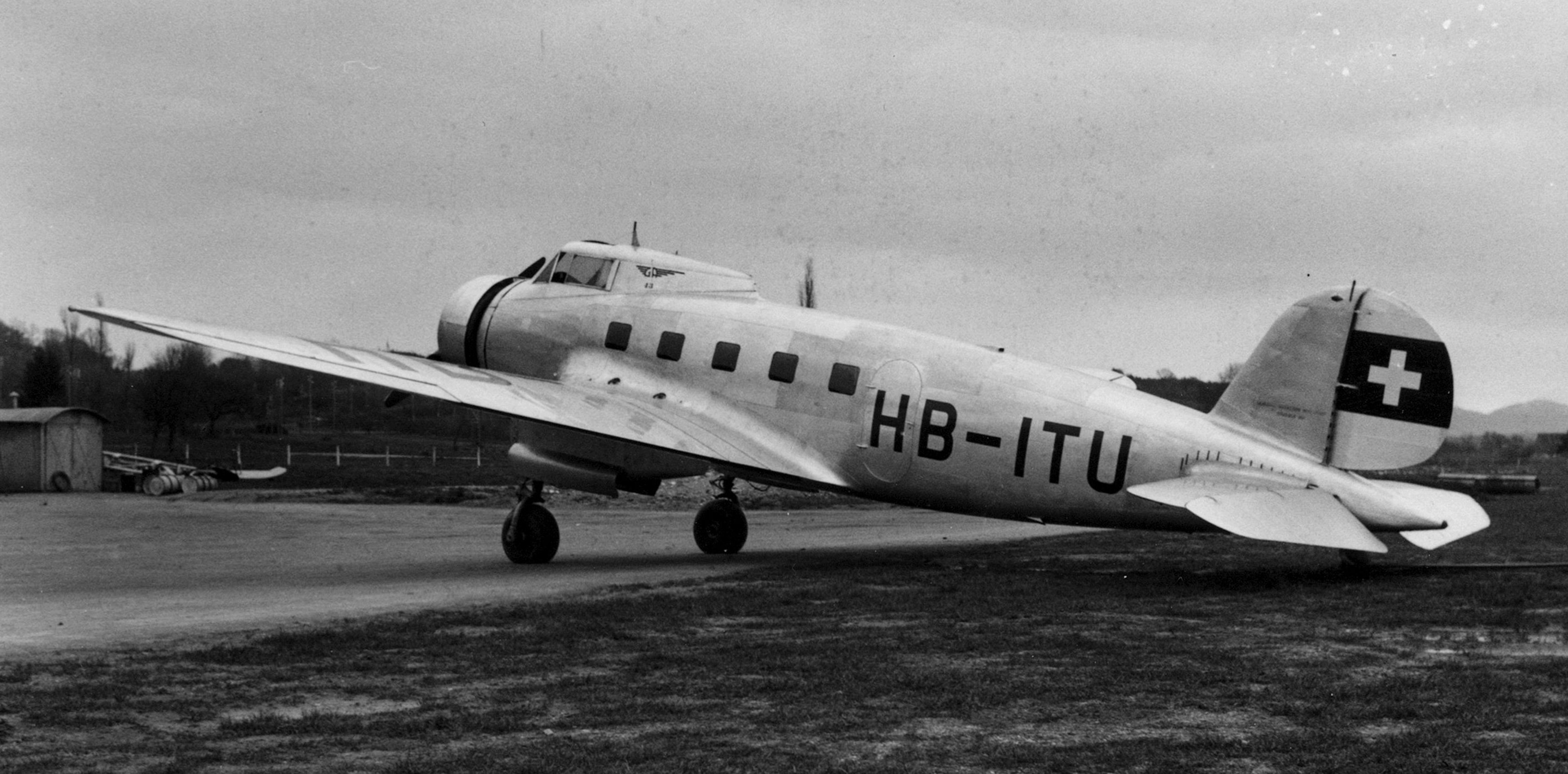
- General Aviation GA-43 HB-ITU in service with Swissair

General information
- Type: Airliner
- National origin: United States of America
- Manufacturer: General Aviation
- Designer: Virginius E. Clark
- Primary user: Swissair
- Number built: 5

History
- First flight: 22 May 1932

The General Aviation GA-43 was a single engine low-wing monoplane airliner produced in small numbers in the United States in the mid-1930s, also known as the Pilgrim 150, Fairchild 150, and sometimes but erroneously as the Clark GA-43 for the designer, Virginius E. Clark who was also responsible for the Clark Y airfoil section used.

The prototype was developed and built by Fairchild's American Pilgrim division, but the program was taken over by General Aviation when the firm purchased American Pilgrim shortly before the prototype had flown. Although this first flight took place in 1932, manufacture did not commence until 1934, by which time General Motors had, in turn, gained a controlling interest in North American Aviation and merged it with General Aviation, which they already owned. The result of this was that the GA-43 became the first aircraft produced by North American.

== Development ==
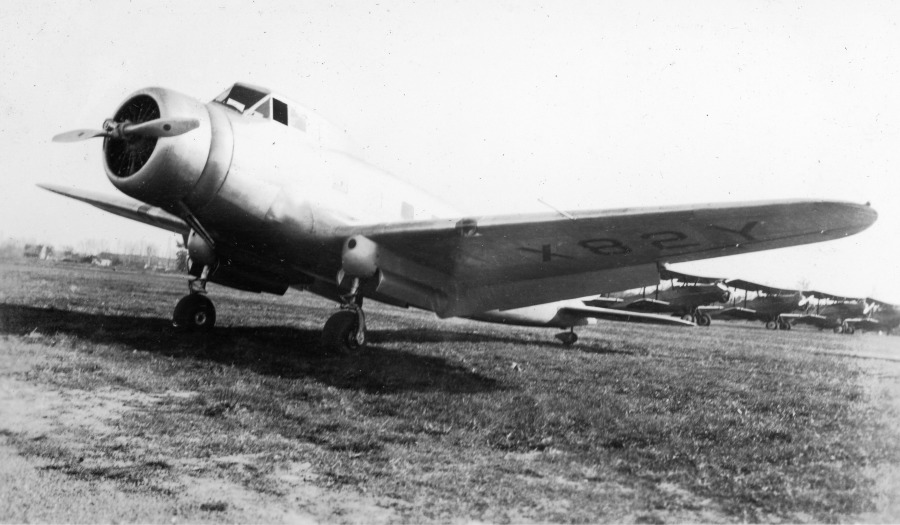
One of the prototypes

The GA-43 was a conventional low-wing cantilever monoplane of all-metal construction. The prototype had fixed tailwheel landing gear, but the main units of this were later changed to be made retractable, and three of the four production examples also had retractable mainwheels, while the fourth aircraft had twin floats instead. The oval-section fuselage contained a ten-seat passenger cabin, and the cockpit was located atop the fuselage under a separate canopy.

== Operators ==
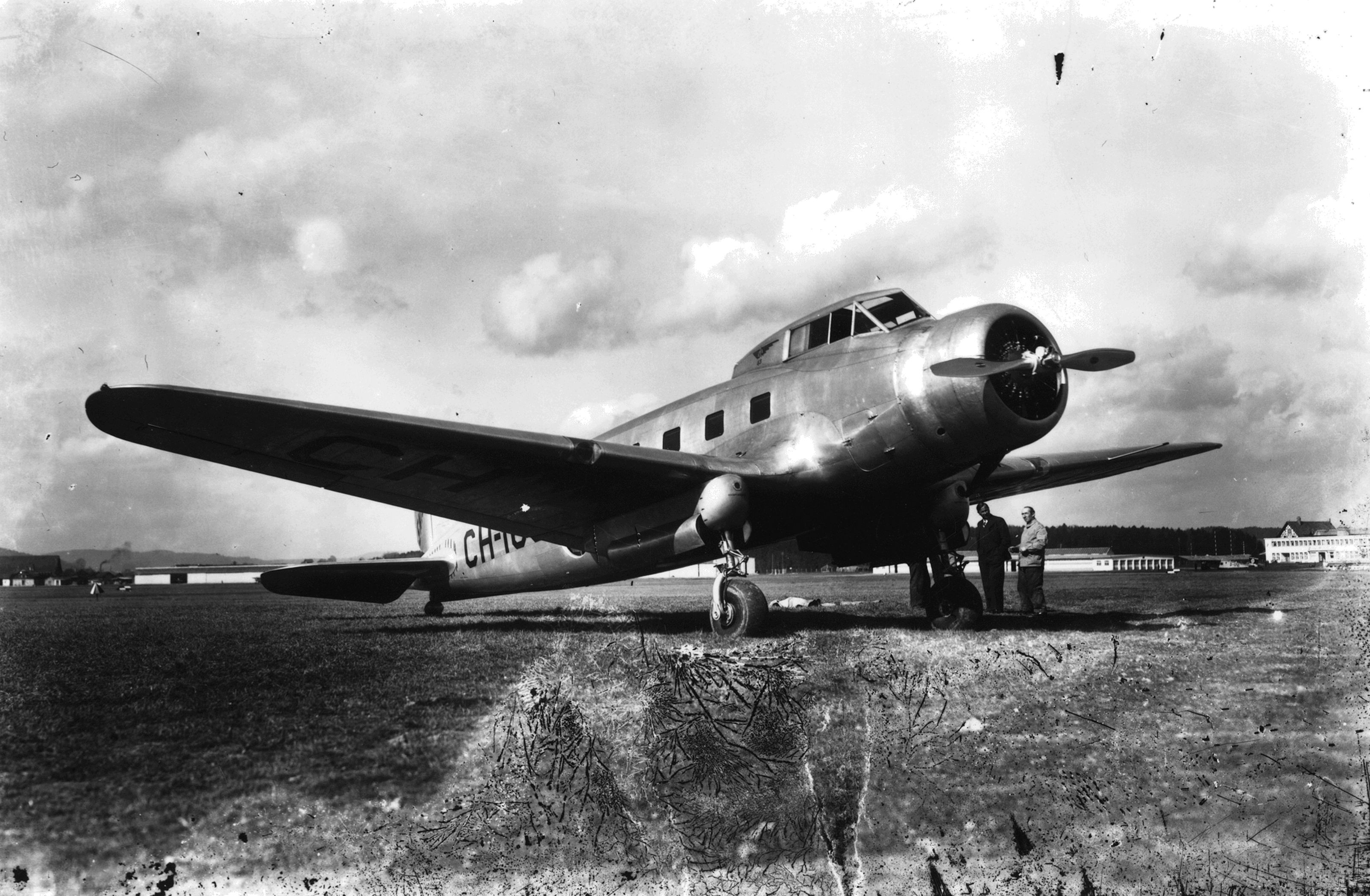
GA-43 at Dubendorf

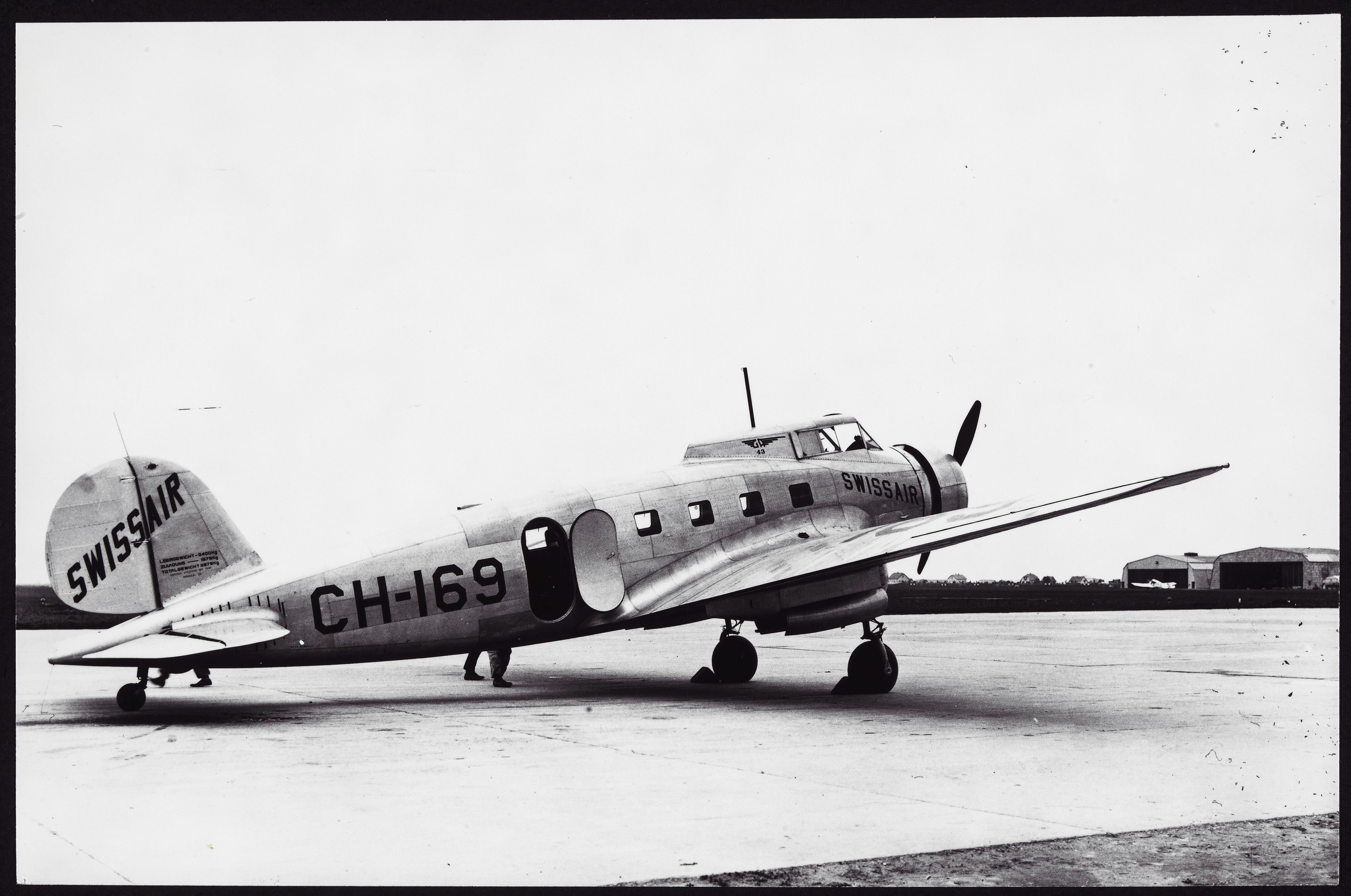
Swissair GA-43

Colombia
Sociedad Colombo Alemana de Transportes Aéreos (SCATA) (1 aircraft on floats)
Manchukuo

- A single example was used by the Manchukuo National Airways

Spain
Líneas Aéreas Postales Españolas (LAPE) (1 aircraft)
Switzerland
Swissair (2 aircraft)

== Specifications ==
Data from American airplane specifications

General characteristics

- Crew: two pilots
- Capacity: ten passengers
- Length: 43 ft 8 in (13.31 m)
- Wingspan: 53 ft 0 in (16.15 m)
- Height: 12 ft 9 in (3.89 m)
- Wing area: 460 sq ft (43 m^{2})
- Airfoil: Clark Y
- Empty weight: 5,460 lb (2,477 kg)
- Gross weight: 8,750 lb (3,969 kg)
- Fuel capacity: 176 US gal (147 imp gal; 670 L)
- Powerplant: 1 × 9-cylinder air-cooled Wright R-1820 Cyclone radial engine , 712 hp (531 kW)
- Propellers: 10 ft 0 in (3.05 m) diameter

Performance

- Maximum speed: 210 mph (340 km/h, 180 kn)
- Cruise speed: 190 mph (310 km/h, 170 kn)
- Stall speed: 59 mph (95 km/h, 51 kn)
- Range: 680 mi (1,090 km, 590 nmi)
- Service ceiling: 22,000 ft (6,700 m)
- Rate of climb: 900 ft/min (4.6 m/s)

== See also ==
- 1932 in aviation

Aircraft of comparable role, configuration, and era

- Boeing Monomail
- Breese-Dallas Model 1
- Junkers Ju 160
- Manshū Hayabusa
- Northrop Delta
- Kharkiv KhAI-1
- Vultee V-1
