= Vance Breese =

Aviation engineer and test pilot

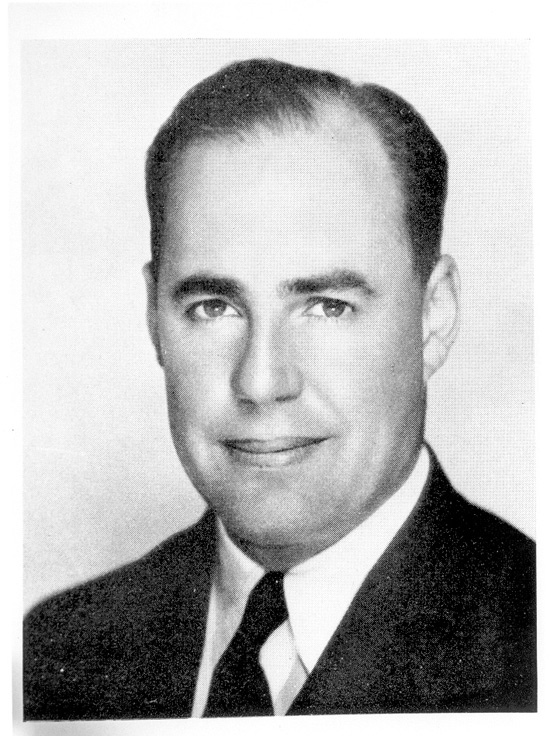
- Vance Breese, c. 1940
- Born: April 20, 1904; Keystone, Washington
- Died: June 26, 1973 (age 69); Los Angeles, California
- Occupations: Engineer, Aviator
- Children: Vance Breese and Eleanore Delphine Breese-Laughran

Vance Breese (1904–1973) was an American aviation engineer and test pilot.

== Early years ==
Vance Breese was born in Keystone, Washington, on April 20, 1904. His education, in his own words was: "various engineering extension courses." More than an engineer, he devoted his life to aviation.

== Aviation career ==
In 1926, Breese founded the (Vance) Breese Aircraft Company at Mills Field, San Francisco and was its president, from 1927 to 1934.

Competing in the 1926 National Air Tour, flying a Ryan M-1 monoplane with a Wright J-4 engine, he finished in eighth place, although he had actually been in first place when he reached Cleveland, Ohio, one of 14 cities in the competition. During the 15-day event which was the second annual commercial airplane reliability tour, Breese carried J. B. Alexander and A. L. Hufford as passengers.

=== Aviation companies ===
The companies that Breese operated, appeared under various names, in 1927 as the Breese-(Arthur F. "Pop") Wilde Aircraft Construction Co/Breese Flying School. In 1928, after incorporation, the company moved to Watts Airport, Beaverton Oregon. In 1929, the Breese Aircraft Corporation of Delaware was organized to purchase the Breese Aircraft Corporation of Oregon. In 1931 the Breese Aircraft Corporation relocated to Portland.

In 1932, as the Breese & (Charles) Dallas Inc relocated to Detroit. The Breese Aircraft Company became part of the Detroit Aircraft Company and in early 1932, together with Gerard "Jerry" Vultee, he founded the Airplane Development Corporation. In the same year, Breese became the Vice President of Air Express Corp, a short-lived operation that was established to operate a daily 17- to 18-hr service between New York and Los Angeles flying two Lockheed Vegas and three Lockheed Orions, exclusively for express mail with the first flight on December 12, 1932. Other cargos included Oranges from California, and Lobsters from New York.

In 1934, at the head of the Vance Breese Company, Breese moved back to California, setting up in Mines Field, Los Angeles.

=== Breese aircraft ===
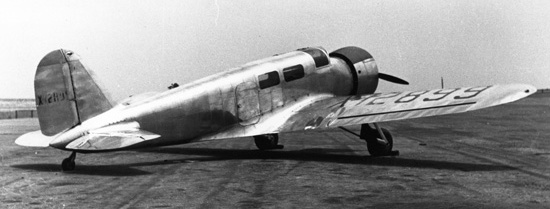
Breese-Dallas X/model 1

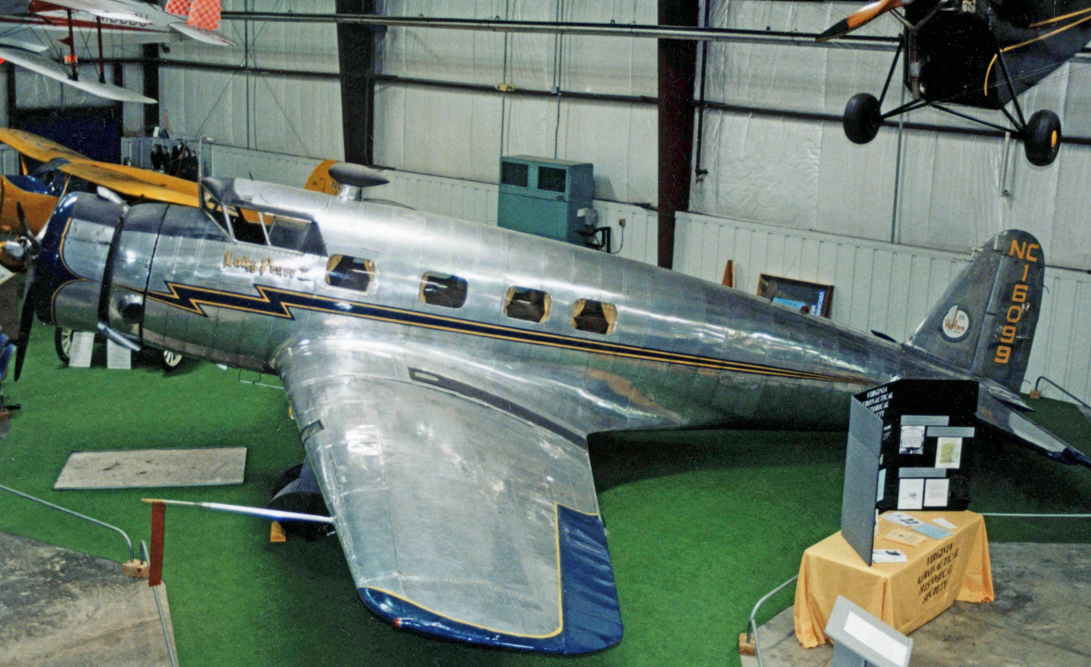
Vultee V-1

Breese aircraft were produced in small numbers, with seven Breese 5 monoplanes sold, including the Pabco Pacific Flyer that participated in the disastrous 1927 Dole Air Race from Oakland to Hawaii. On April 16, 1928, another Breese 5, piloted by Breese, had a total engine failure when the motor fell off its mounts over San Francisco. "By having his passengers move forward in the cabin to shift the c/g, Breese was able to maintain control and land safely on an open hillside." A single example of the 1928 Breese R-6-C (experimental dive bomber), 1931 Breese Junior, 1933 Breese R-6-3 and the Breese-Dallas X (used for film work and owned by Paul Mantz).

After American Airlines showed interest in the larger six-passenger Vultee V-1 design, Errett Lobban (E.L.) Cord bought all 500 shares of stock in the company and the Airplane Development Corporation became a Cord subsidiary.

Due to the Air Mail Act of 1934, AVCO established the Aviation Manufacturing Corporation (AMC) on November 30, 1934, through the acquisition of Cord's holdings, including Vultee's Airplane Development Corporation. AMC was liquidated on January 1, 1936, and Vultee Aircraft Division was formed as an autonomous subsidiary of AVCO. Jerry Vultee was named vice president and chief engineer. Vultee acquired the assets of the defunct AMC, including Lycoming and Stinson Aircraft Company.

Meanwhile, Vultee and Breese had redesigned the V-1 to meet American Airlines' needs and created the eight-passenger V-1A. American purchased 11 V-1As, but the aircraft ultimately failed due to safety concerns about a single-engine aircraft and the advent of the twin-engine Douglas DC-2s and DC-3s. Vultee redesigned the V-1 into the V-11 attack aircraft for the United States Army Air Corps, but it received few initial orders. In November 1939, the Vultee Aircraft Division of AVCO was reorganized as an independent company but Breese was not part of the company at that point.

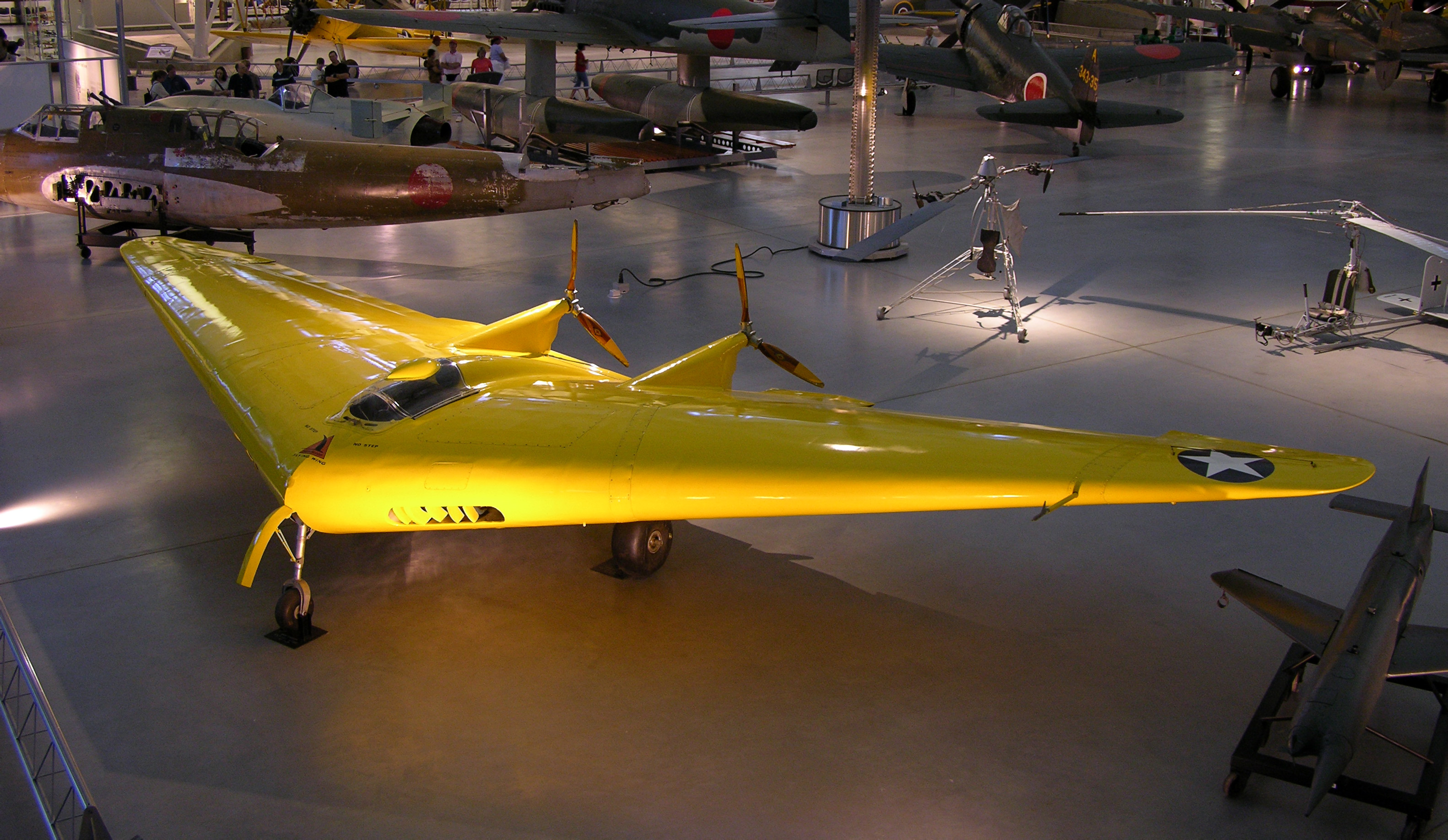
Breese was the first pilot of the Northrop N-1M.

=== Test flying ===
Breese was a highly qualified test pilot, having flown more than 100 types of aircraft. The legend about Breese's charges was that he charged by the "foot of wingspan." His fees could be as high as $5,000 for a single flight.

During 1933–1934, Breese moved to California and worked for Fokker. In 1937, he also worked for Bennett Aircraft Corp. as consultant, VP and test pilot, instrumental in the design and testing of the Bennett BTC-1 Executive twin-engined transport. Breese joined North American in 1939–1940, as a Consultant Engineer and Test Pilot. In September 1939, Breese test flew the prototype Vultee P-66 Vanguard. On October 26, 1940, he was the first pilot to fly the NA-73X prototype that became the North American P-51 Mustang and completed the maiden flight of the North American B-25 Mitchell. Later, joining Northrop Corporation as a test pilot, he demonstrated the Northrop Navy fighter and Northrop N-3PB floatplane. As Northrop's Chief Test Pilot, Breese flew the Northrop N-1M on its maiden flight on July 3, 1941, and was at the controls of the first XP-61 prototype on May 26, 1942.

He was also a "contract" test pilot for Bell Aircraft, Douglas Aircraft Company and Lockheed. He was involved in the testing of the Bell P-39 Airacobra, Douglas SBD Dauntless and flew the Lockheed P-38 Lightning prototypes through a series of "flutter" tests. One of the unusual experiments in which Breese was involved, concerned the use of a parachute for an aircraft, successfully demonstrating the device in 1930.

When the experimental Keith Rider R-3 "Firecracker" racer was rebuilt after a crash, Breese flew the R-3 for a time intending to set a few world speed records before the 1935 National Air Races.

Breese died on June 26, 1973, in Los Angeles. He was listed as an Honorary Fellow of the Society of Experimental Test Pilots. His son and namesake, Vance Breese Jr. followed in his father's footsteps as an aircraft designer in the Breese Aircraft company he founded.
