= No. 8 Squadron RCAF =

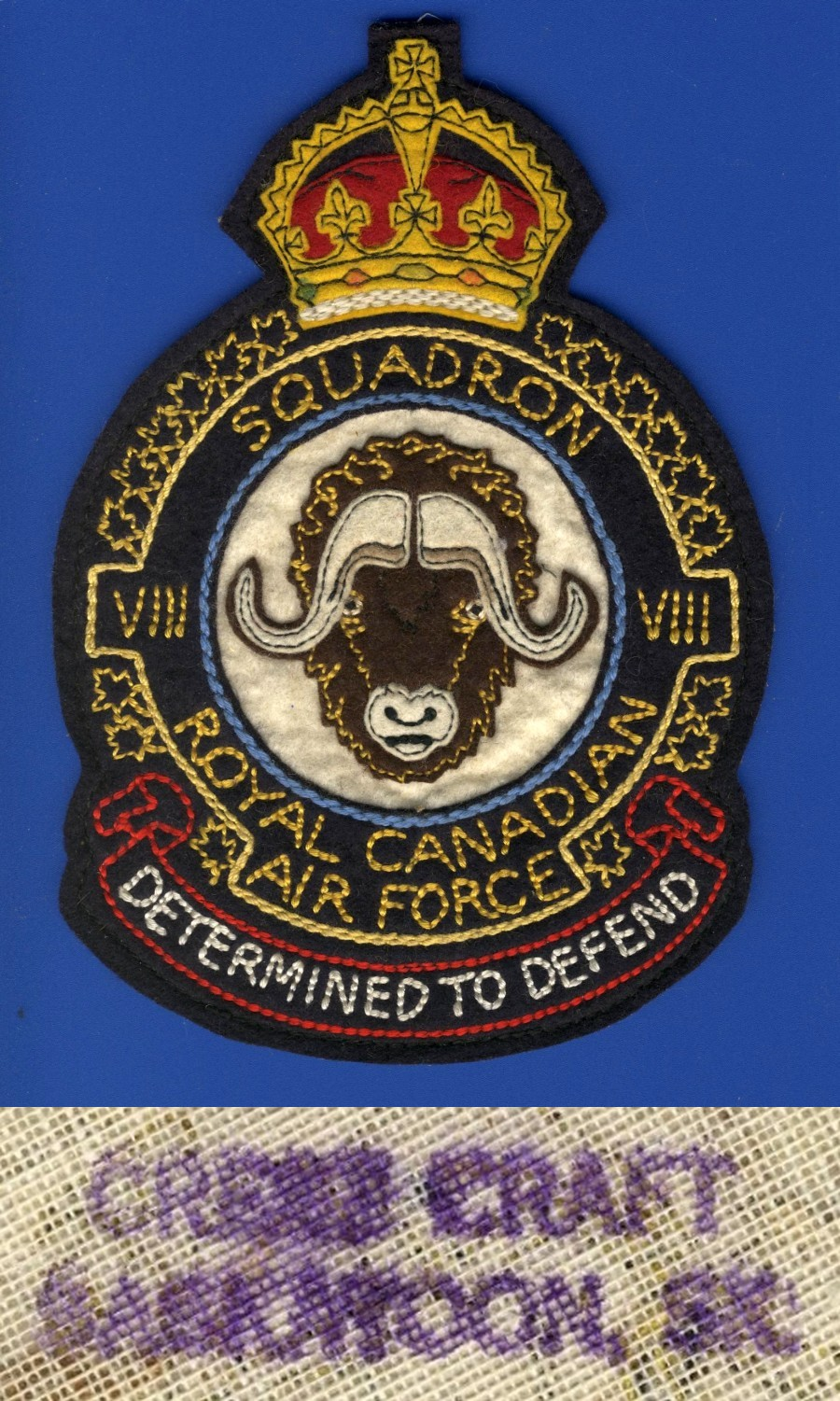
- A RCAF World War II heraldic jacket patch for VIII (8) Squadron.
- Active: 14 Feb 1936 - 25 May 1945
- Country: Canada
- Allegiance: Canada
- Branch: Royal Canadian Air Force
- Role: Bomber Reconnaissance
- Nickname(s): Musk Ox
- Motto(s): "Determined to Defend"
- Battle honours: North West Atlantic 1939-41; Pacific Coast 1941-45; Aleutians 1943

Insignia
- Unit Codes: YO (Aug 1939 - May 1942), GA (May - Oct 1942)

Aircraft flown
- Bomber: Bristol Bolingbroke I and IV; Lockheed Ventura GR.V
- Patrol: Canadian Vickers Vedette; Northrop Delta
- Transport: Fairchild 71; Bellanca CH-300 Pacemaker

No. 8 Squadron RCAF was a unit of the Royal Canadian Air Force (RCAF) that was in operation from 1936 to 1945.

== History ==
No. 8 Squadron was formed on the 14 February 1936 as a General Purpose (GP) squadron at Winnipeg, Manitoba. The squadron moved to Ottawa/Rockcliffe Airport in February 1937, where it was tasked as a photographic unit, equipped with Fairchild 71, Bellanca Pacemaker and Canadian Vickers Vedette.

Mobilized on the 10 September 1939 as No. 8 (GR) Squadron at Sydney, Nova Scotia, It was redesignated Bomber Reconnaissance (BR) at the end of October 1939. Equipped with Northrop Deltas and Bristol Bolingbrokes, the squadron was tasked with anti-submarine duty while serving with RCAF Eastern Air Command.

In December 1941, after the Japanese attack on Pearl Harbor the squadron was moved to RCAF Station Sea Island on the west coast of Canada as part of RCAF Western Air Command. In June 1942 in response to the Japanese attack on the Aleutians, it was moved to Alaska flying the Bristol Bolingbroke V as part of RCAF X Wing, operating from Elmendorf Army Airfield (Anchorage), with small detachments stationed at Naval Air Station Kodiak and Marks Air Force Base (Nome).

The squadron returned to RCAF Station Sea Island in March 1943. Having converted to Lockheed Ventura GR.V in May 1943, the squadron continued with anti-submarine duty based from RCAF Station Port Hardy and RCAF Station Patricia Bay. No. 8 Squadron was disbanded at Patricia Bay, B.C. 25 May 1945.

== Equipment ==
- Fairchild 71 (Feb 31–Aug 39)
- Bellanca CH-300 Pacemaker (Apr 36–Aug 39)
- Canadian Vickers Vedette (May 36–Aug 39)
- Northrop Delta (Feb 37– Nov 41)
- Bristol Bolingbroke I and IV (Dec 40–Aug 43)
- Lockheed Ventura GR.V (May 43–May 45)

Two letter Squadron code was YO from Aug 39 - May 42, GA from May until the use of Squadron codes was discontinued in the RCAF HWE on the 16 Oct 1942, "for security reasons".

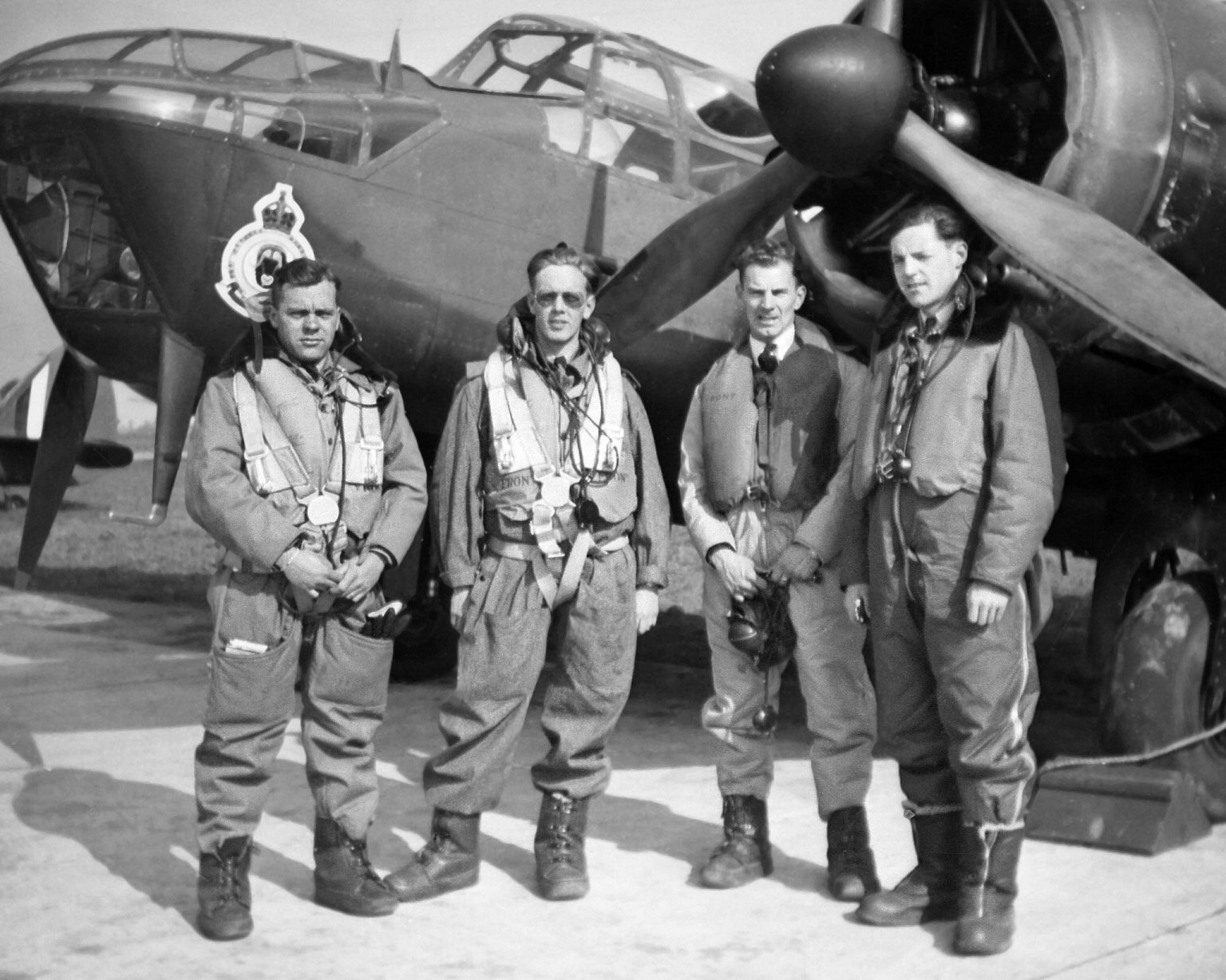
Aircrew and their aircraft of 8 (BR) Squadron Alaska 1942

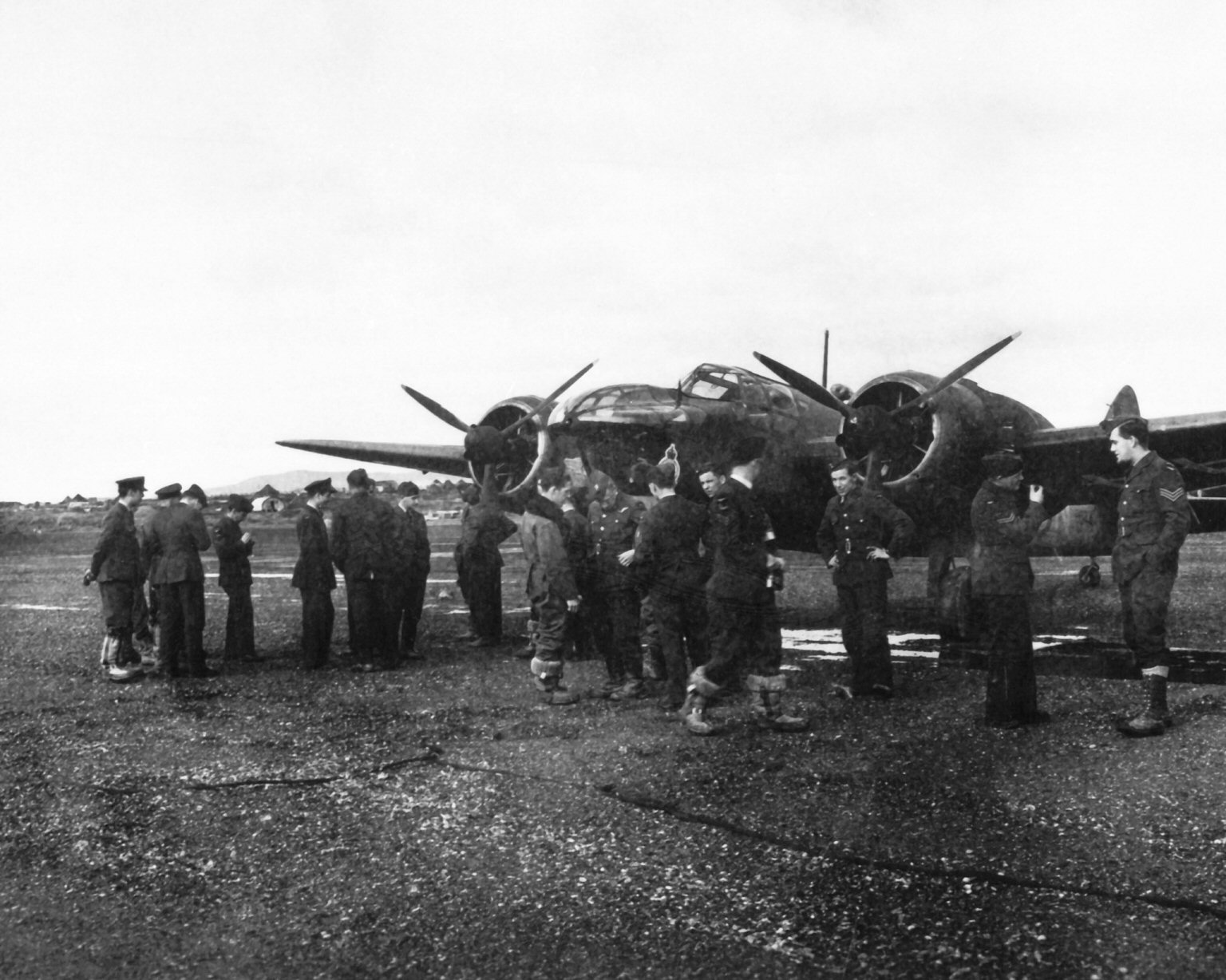
Bolingbroke and personnel of 8 (BR) Squadron Sea Island B.C. 1942'

== Bases ==
RCAF Station Winnipeg Feb 1936–Feb 1937
RCAF Station Rockcliffe Feb 1937–Aug 1939
RCAF Aerodrome - Sydney, Nova Scotia Aug 1939–Dec 1941
RCAF Station Sea Island Dec 1941–Jun 1942
Elmendorf Army Airfield Jun 1942–Mar 1943
RCAF Station Sea Island Mar–May 1943
RCAF Station Patricia Bay May 1943–May 1945

== See also ==
Related lists

- List of Royal Canadian Air Force squadrons
- List of aircraft of the Canadian Air Force
