= Tairov OKO-1 =

OKO-1

General information
- Type: Experimental transport aircraft
- National origin: USSR
- Manufacturer: OKO (Kiev)
- Designer: Vsevolod Konstantinovich Tairov
- Status: cancelled (no production commenced)
- Number built: 1

History
- First flight: October 1937

The Tairov OKO-1 (Opytno Konstrooktorskoye - experimental design section), was a passenger transport aircraft produced in the Ukrainian SSR in the USSR in 1937.

== Development ==
Late in 1935 V.K. Tairov helped form the OKO (experimental design section) in Kiev. In 1937 the OKO-1 was completed as a six-seat passenger transport, with all wood construction, this single engined monoplane demonstrated good performance with state-of-the-art systems. Electrically driven flaps, pneumatic wheel brakes, trimmers on all the tail surfaces, heated cabin, lighting and instruments for night or blind flying, full sound-proofing and full GVF(civil air fleet) equipment were all incorporated. The performance of the aircraft in flight tests was regarded as excellent but, for unknown reasons, production was not undertaken.

== Specifications (OKO-1) ==
Data from Gunston, Bill. "Encyclopaedia of Russian Aircraft 1875-1995". London:Osprey. 1995. ISBN 1-85532-405-9

General characteristics

- Crew: 2
- Capacity: 6
- Length: 11.6 m (38 ft 0.75 in)
- Wingspan: 15.4 m (50 ft 6.33 in)
- Wing area: 35.1 m^{2} (378 sq ft)
- Empty weight: 2,370 kg (5,225 lb)
- Gross weight: 3,500 kg (7,716 lb)
- Powerplant: 1 × M-25A , 544.36 kW (730 hp)

Performance

- Maximum speed: 347 km/h (216 mph, 188 kn)
- Range: 2,300 km (1,429 mi, 1,242 nmi)
- Endurance: 2 hours 30 minutes
- Service ceiling: 6,740 m (22,100 ft)
- Rate of climb: 5.55 m/s (1,093.6 ft/min)

== See also ==
Aircraft of comparable role, configuration, and era

- Airspeed Envoy
- General Aviation GA-43
- Heinkel He 70
- Junkers Ju 60
- Kharkiv KhAI-1
- Lockheed Model 9 Orion
- Manshū Hayabusa
- Polikarpov/Rafaelyants PR-12
- Vultee V-1
- Northrop Delta

Related lists

- List of aircraft
