= Breese-Dallas Model 1 =

Model 1
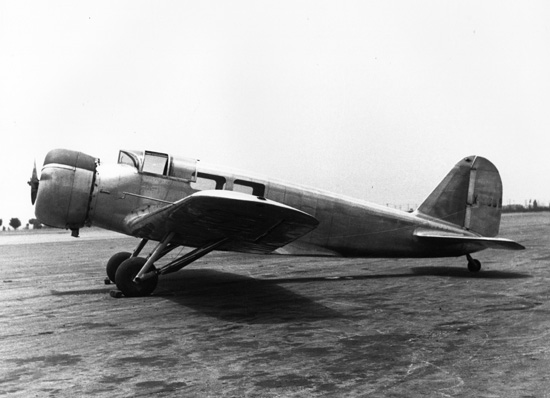

General information
- Type: Commercial monoplane
- National origin: United States
- Manufacturer: Breese-Dallas Airplane Company
- Designer: W.A. Mankey, Jerry Vultee
- Status: Crashed in Mexico, 10 January 1937
- Number built: 1

History
- First flight: February 1933

The Breese-Dallas Model 1 or Breese model X was a prototype single engine airliner that rapidly changed hands throughout the 1930s. It was also known as the Michigan Aircraft Company Model 1, and the Lambert Model 1344.

== Design and development ==
Vance Breese partnered with Detroit auto salesman, Charles Dallas to produce a modern, transcontinental, all-metal construction cargo aircraft. The aircraft was engineered by Art Mankey with some part-time design work by Jerry Vultee, who would go on to develop a slightly larger concept called the Vultee V-1.

The aircraft is a six-passenger, all-metal, single-engine, low-wing monoplane with hydraulically retractable conventional landing gear. The center fuselage is welded steel tubing. The cockpit used a split forward slanting windshield popular on large aircraft of the period, with rearward sliding canopy panels over the pilots. There is a large passenger doorway just behind the right wing. The aircraft was constructed around an eight-inch steel tube jig that was removed after assembly. The first engine used was sourced from a Boeing P-12E from Selfridge Field using a NACA cowling. Four small passenger windows were expanded for better visibility. The engine was upgraded in 1936 to an 800 hp (600 kW) Pratt & Whitney SRB-1535 with additional fuel capacity, raising it to 400 US gal (1,500 L; 330 imp gal).

== Operational history ==
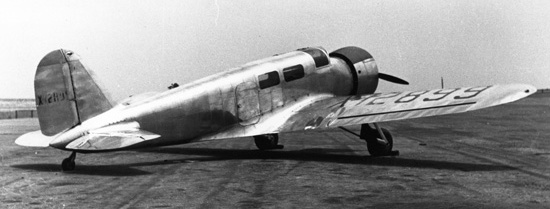
Rear quarter view of Breese-Dallas model 1, still with temporary NX registration

Construction of the Model 1 started in September 1932 and the first flight was made in February 1933 by Vance Breese and Frederick Coe.

On 1 May 1933, the aircraft was sold to a new company formed by Charles Dallas, and F.A. Culver called the Michigan Aircraft Company. The model 1 was renamed the Michigan Aircraft Company Model 1 on 7 June.

In 1934 The Model 1 was sold to the Dallas owned Select Motor Sales, and again in March to Charles Dallas for testing, and once more to the Lambert Aircraft Corporation where it was registered as the Lambert Model 1344, and sold back to Select Motor Sales.

In 1935 the aircraft was sold again, to Vance Breese who proposed the aircraft as a bomber for the Universal Studios movie Storm over the Andes which starred Jack Holt and Christy Cabanne. Breese prepared the aircraft for the Bendix Trophy race but did not enter that year.

The aircraft was sold to Jacqueline Cochran in October 1936 for use in the 1936 Bendix Race, but on orders from her husband, a gear up landing was made.

In 1937 Cochran sold the aircraft to Paul Mantz's Union Air Services in January, and it was re-registered in Mexico. The Model 1 crashed outside of Mexico City on 10 January 1937 while being delivered to the Spanish Republican Air Force. The pilot was later jailed for smuggling aircraft in violation of the United States Neutrality Act which was blocking weapons from reaching government forces fighting against Fascists during the Spanish Civil War.

== Specifications (Model 1) ==
Data from Skyways

General characteristics

- Crew: 1
- Capacity: 5
- Length: 28 ft 4 in (8.64 m)
- Wingspan: 40 ft (12 m)
- Gross weight: 4,750 lb (2,155 kg)
- Fuel capacity: 110 US gallons (420 L; 92 imp gal)
- Powerplant: 1 × Pratt & Whitney SD-1 Wasp air-cooled radial engine, 500 hp (370 kW)
- Propellers: 2-bladed

Performance

- Maximum speed: 247 mph (398 km/h, 215 kn)
- Cruise speed: 210 mph (340 km/h, 180 kn)
- Stall speed: 57 mph (92 km/h, 50 kn)

== See also ==
Aircraft of comparable role, configuration, and era

- Heinkel He 70
- Junkers Ju 60
- Lockheed Model 9 Orion
- Manshū Hayabusa
- Northrop Delta
- Vultee V-1
