= Manshū Hayabusa =

Japanese airliner

MT-1 Hayabusa
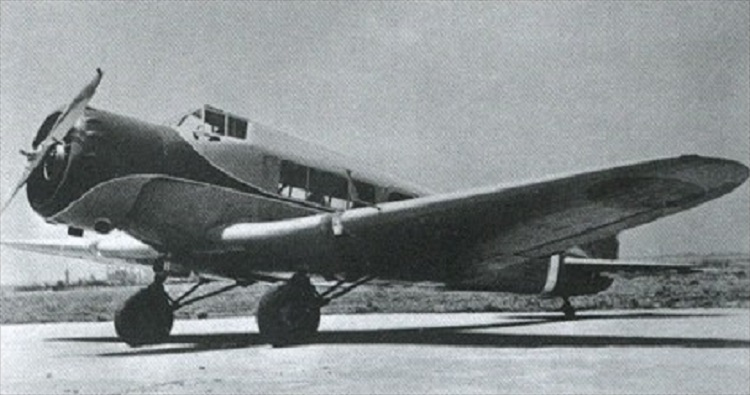

General information
- Type: Airliner
- National origin: Manchukuo
- Manufacturer: Manchuria Airplane Manufacturing Company
- Primary user: Manchukuo National Airways
- Number built: 50-55

History
- First flight: April 1937

The Manshū MT-1 Hayabusa (Japanese: 隼, "Peregrine Falcon") was an airliner produced by the Japanese Manchuria Airplane Manufacturing Company in Manchukuo in the late 1930s. It was a conventional, low-wing cantilever monoplane with fixed tailwheel undercarriage. The flight deck was fully enclosed and separate from the passenger cabin, which could seat six people. The type equipped Manchukuo National Airways.

== Specifications (Production aircraft) ==
Data from Japanese Aircraft, 1910-1941

General characteristics

- Crew: 1 pilot
- Capacity: 6 passengers
- Length: 9.38 m (30 ft 9 in)
- Wingspan: 13.60 m (44 ft 7 in)
- Height: 3.60 m (11 ft 10 in)
- Wing area: 27.3 m^{2} (294 sq ft)
- Empty weight: 1,700 kg (3,748 lb)
- Gross weight: 2,700 kg (5,952 lb)
- Powerplant: 1 × Nakajima Kotobuki 2-kai-1 nine-cylinder air-cooled radial engine , 343 kW (460 hp)

Performance

- Maximum speed: 240 km/h (150 mph, 130 kn)
- Cruise speed: 200 km/h (120 mph, 110 kn)
- Range: 902 km (560 mi, 487 nmi)
- Service ceiling: 6,000 m (20,000 ft)

== See also ==
Aircraft of comparable role, configuration, and era

- Airspeed Envoy
- Boeing Monomail
- Breese-Dallas Model 1
- General Aviation/Clarke GA-43
- Heinkel He 70
- Junkers Ju 60
- Kharkiv KhAI-1
- Lockheed Model 9 Orion
- Northrop Delta
- Polikarpov/Rafaelyants PR-12
- Tairov OKO-1
- Vultee V-1
