= Heinkel He 70 Blitz =

Airliner, mailplane, and light bomber aircraft

He 70
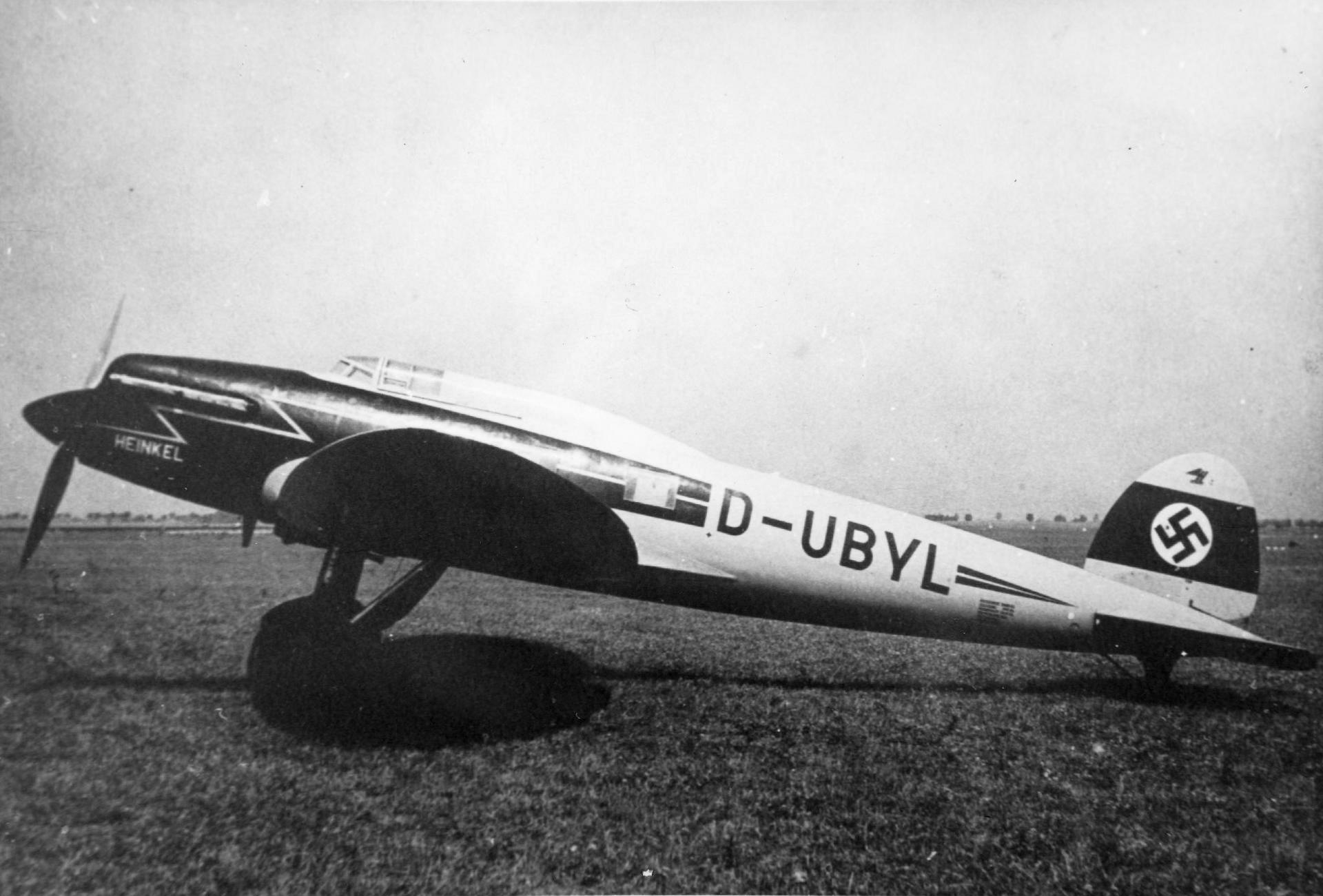

General information
- Type: Mail plane, Passenger
- National origin: Germany
- Manufacturer: Heinkel Flugzeugwerke
- Primary users: Deutsche Luft Hansa Luftwaffe; Royal Hungarian Air Force; Ejército del Aire
- Number built: 324

History
- Introduction date: 1933
- First flight: 1 December 1932
- Retired: 1954 (Spanish Air Force)

The Heinkel He 70 Blitz ("lightning") was a fast monoplane aircraft designed and produced by the German aircraft manufacturer Heinkel Flugzeugwerke. It was the first Schnellbomber operated by the Luftwaffe.

Development of the He 70 began in the early 1930s in response to a request from Deutsche Lufthansa for a fast mail plane. Heinkel designed a low-wing cantilever monoplane with various measures to minimise drag, including an aerodynamically efficient elliptical wing, a smooth external finish, and a retractable undercarriage. The He 70 was powered by a single BMW VI 7.3 Z engine and cooled by a compact retractable radiator as a further drag-reducing measure. The first prototype made its maiden flight on 1 December 1932 and set eight separate world speed records over the following months.

The He 70 was adopted by Deutsche Lufthansa in 1934, although its commercial career was relatively brief before it was replaced by larger and more capable aircraft. In addition to its civilian use, the He 70 was adapted for military purposes, as a light bomber and reconnaissance aircraft. Militarised versions were operated by the Royal Hungarian Air Force and the Ejército del Aire. The type was already relegated to secondary roles, such as training, by the outbreak of the Second World War. The He 70 is perhaps best known as being an ancestor to the Heinkel He 111, which had a similar elliptical wing.

== Design and development ==
The Heinkel He 70 Blitz (Lightning) was designed in the early 1930s as a mailplane for Deutsche Lufthansa in response to a request for an aircraft faster than the Lockheed Model 9 Orion (used by Swissair) to service short routes. While German officials initially specified a desired top speed of 250 kilometres per hour (160 mph) in 1931, this was subsequently superseded by an increased top speed of 320 km/h (200 mph). Around this time, Germany was already experimenting with producing high-speed mail planes which could compete with American offerings; furthermore, it was generally recognised that the speed of an aircraft was a major competitive advantage over other modes of transportation. It was also recognised that to achieve such performance, engine power alone would not suffice; the airframe needed to be aerodynamically refined.

On 12 February 1932 a formal order was placed for the design and construction of an aircraft designated He 65, which had a guaranteed top speed of 285 kilometres per hour (177 mph). However, in July of that year, it was decided to modify the design so that it could achieve a greater maximum speed; this redesign was designated the He 70. The redesigned aircraft had a guaranteed top speed of 312 km/h (194 mph) while maintaining identical cabin dimensions, wing loading, and landing speeds to its American-built competitors. The aircraft's speed was prioritised .

A low-wing cantilever monoplane configuration was selected in order to achieve low drag along with adequate fuselage cross-section for the desired cabin space, which had to accommodate two crew plus five passengers and their baggage. The arrangement was different from that of those of the rival aircraft manufacturer Junkers, possessing greater aerodynamic performance for the fuselage section in proportion to its usable cabin space. Wing flaps were initially not used in order to save weight, increase simplicity, and achieve a greater top speed; although the aircraft had satisfactory landing characteristics, it was decided to add compact flaps so that shorter landing strips could be used. Various configurations were tested.

Various wing configurations were considered, the design team having to balance pure aerodynamic performance against various other factors and characteristics, such as roll damping, weight, and the need to accommodate the retractable undercarriage. Particular care was paid to obtain a high level of torsional stiffness and a sufficient margin against any oscillations, which was a particular problem for cantilever wings. The selected wing's profile thickness tapered considerably towards the wing tips while the camber corresponded directly with wing thickness and determined mathematically. The wing was made of wood and had a twin-spar structure that extended into two box-shaped recesses in the fuselage where they were secured to the main frames using bolts. The ribs were made of spruce and the webs were of laminated birch; the exterior was covered in plywood, adding to the wing's torsional stiffness.

A spindle-shaped monocoque fuselage composed of duralumin was adopted. The longerons, bulkheads and stiffeners were all open channel sections; the combination of frame bulkheads and longitudinal channel sections permitted unobstructed compartments. The cabin extended across four primary bulkheads; all channels near the cabin were riveted to the skin. The bulkheads themselves were not directly connected to the skin. The fuselage terminated in a series of longitudinal channels that rested on circular bulkheads and was riveted to the skin. While not particularly resistant to buckling, the amount that did occur even under high stresses was considered to be reasonably minor. Thick shell plates for conveying local stresses were only present in a few key locations, such as near to the main wing fittings.

The fuselage was flush riveted to minimize drag. For similar reasons, all fittings, including the foot steps and door knobs, were inset and flush windows were fitted. Another drag-reduction measure was the fully retractable main undercarriage which made use of the space in between the wing spars. The ailerons were precisely balanced to prevent flutter. The cantilever flight control surfaces were elliptical in planform. No wind tunnel testing was conducted prior to the completion of the first He 70 due to alleged calculation complications between models and real aircraft, although several wind tunnel tests were performed after the aircraft's completion.

It was typically flown by a crew of two, a pilot and radio operator, who were seated in a tandem configuration in a fairly central position that was slightly elevated for a better view. The view was further improved by the presence of a transparent movable cabin roof and an adjustable seat. A third seat, intended for use by a mechanic or a single passenger, was also present in the cockpit. Aft of the flight crew's position was a compact cabin that seated up to four passengers in pairs facing each other. The passenger cabin had air-based heating and ventilation and large windows which could be used as emergency exits. Aft of the cabin was a baggage hold.

It was powered by a single BMW VI V-12 engine, capable of producing up to 470 kW (630 hp) at 1,600 rpm. Unusually, this engine was cooled using ethylene glycol rather than water, which enabled the use of a more compact radiator. This was located beneath the fuselage and had one-third of the frontal area of a conventional counterpart, and could be retracted when the aircraft was flying at high speeds to further reduce drag. The bottom of the oil tank, which was partitioned, was used for cooling; a wing pump was used for oil circulation. Both the engine and its cowling were streamlined wherever practical to do so. The aircraft was considered to be capable of achieving even higher speeds if it were to be fitted with a more powerful engine.

The first prototype made its maiden flight on 1 December 1932. Flight testing proved it to possess excellent performance, setting eight world records for speed over distance, and reaching a maximum speed of 377 km/h (234 mph).

== Operational history ==
=== Civil use ===
Luft Hansa operated He 70s between 1934 and 1937 for a fast service which connected Berlin with Frankfurt, Hamburg and Cologne, as well as between Cologne and Hamburg. Between 1934 and 1936, the type was also flown internationally from Stuttgart to Seville; this route was part of the South American mail service provided by Luft Hansa which continued via Bathurst, The Gambia to Natal, Brazil, using Junkers Ju 52/3m and Dornier Wal flying boats.

All remaining aircraft were transferred to the Luftwaffe during 1937.

=== Military use ===
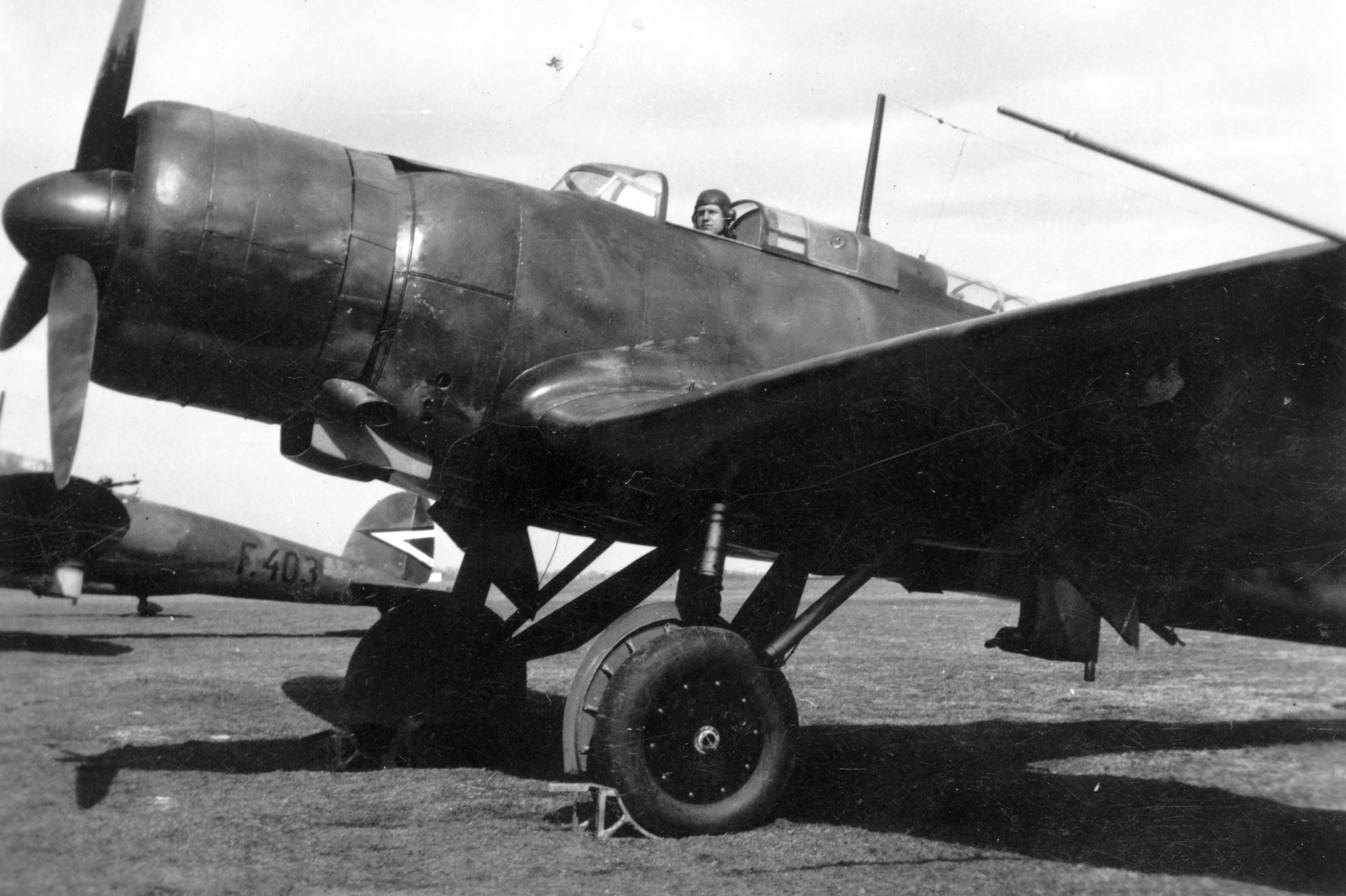
Royal Hungarian Air Force He 70Ks

Starting in 1935, the Luftwaffe operated the He 70, initially as a light bomber and aerial reconnaissance aircraft. As soon as more capable purpose-built designs became available, it was relegated to use as a liaison and courier aircraft.

During the late 1930s, 28 aircraft were sent to Spain as part of the German-manned Condor Legion. These aircraft saw action during the Spanish Civil War, typically as fast reconnaissance aircraft. There they were known as the Rayo, Spanish for "lightning".

A single example was bought by Rolls-Royce for use as an engine testbed: it continued in use until 1944.

==== He 170 ====
The He 70K (later given the RLM number: He 170) was a fast reconnaissance export variant used by the Hungarian Air Force. Powered by a Gnome-Rhône Mistral Major radial engine, the engines were built under license in Hungary as the WM-K-14, but the airframe manufacture and final assembly took place in Germany. The new engines raised the top speed of the aircraft from 360 to 435 km/h (224 to 270 mph). 18 were used by the Royal Hungarian Air Force from 1937 to 1942.

==== Weaknesses ====
A major weakness of the He 70 in military use was the fire risk. Parts of the airframe were made out of an extremely flammable magnesium alloy called "elektron", though the majority of the monocoque fuselage was duralumin. Elektron is very light yet strong, but burns readily when ignited and is difficult to extinguish. Moreover, each wing contained a non-self-sealing 210-litre (47-imperial-gallon) fuel tank, which may have further added to the aircraft's reputation for catching fire.

Other problems included poor defensive armament, short range and poor view from the cabin, all of which led to the Hungarian He 170A fleet being prematurely retired and replaced with obsolescent Heinkel He 46 parasol-wing monoplanes, until Focke-Wulf Fw 189 "Uhu" medium altitude observation aircraft could be introduced.

== Influence ==
While the He 70 saw only limited service in training capacities during the Second World War, it was the Luftwaffe's first Schnellbomber and served as the antecedent for some of the bombers involved in the Battle of Britain.

=== German designs ===
The He 70 is known mainly as the ancestor to the Heinkel He 111, which had similar elliptical wings and streamlined fuselage in a twin-engined configuration. The He 111, which began service with the Luftwaffe in 1936, went on to become the most numerous bomber type of the Luftwaffe – with just over 5,600 examples produced during the war in total – in the early years of World War II.

The He 70 was essentially scaled down to produce the He 112 fighter which lost out on competition against the Messerschmitt Bf 109, but was nonetheless built in small numbers.

=== Japanese designs ===
An He 70 was exported to Japan for study and inspired the Aichi D3A ("Val") carrier-launched light bomber. This aircraft shared the He 70's distinctive, low-mounted elliptical wing.

=== British designs ===
Beverley Shenstone, R.J. Mitchell's aerodynamic advisor denied that the Spitfire wing was copied from the He 70. Shenstone said:

It has been suggested that we at Supermarine had cribbed the wing shape from that of the He 70 transport. This was not so. The elliptical wing had been used on other aircraft and its advantages were well known. Our wing was much thinner than that of the Heinkel and had a quite different section. In any case, it would have been simply asking for trouble to have copied a wing shape from an aircraft designed for an entirely different purpose.

The Günther brothers had already used an elliptical wing for the Bäumer Sausewind sports aircraft before they joined Heinkel.

Shenstone said that the He 70's influence on the Spitfire design was limited to use as a benchmark for aerodynamic smoothness.

== Variants ==
He 70a
First prototype.
He 70b
Second prototype with the crew of two and four seats for passengers.
He 70c
Third prototype armed with machine gun for trials of versions for light bomber, reconnaissance and courier duties.
He 70d
Fourth prototype built in 1934 for Luft Hansa, powered by BMW VI 7,3 engine.
He 70e
Fifth prototype built in 1934 for Luftwaffe as light bomber, powered by BMW VI 7,3 engine.
He 70A
Passenger version for Luft Hansa.
He 70D
Passenger version for Luft Hansa, 12 examples built.
He 70E
Light bomber version for Luftwaffe, later converted to F version.
He 70F
Reconnaissance / courier version for Luftwaffe.
He 70F-1
Long-range reconnaissance version.
He 70F-2
Similar to the He 70F-1
He 70G
Passenger version built for Luft Hansa, after 1937 converted to F version.
He 70G-1
One aircraft fitted with a 810 hp (600 kW) Rolls-Royce Kestrel piston engine.
He 70K (He 170A)
Military variant equipped with a licence-built 746 kW (1,000 hp) WM-K-14 radial engine.
He 270 V1 (W.Nr. 1973, D-OEHF)
Prototype with DB-601Aa inline engine.

== Operators ==
=== Civil operators ===
Nazi Germany

- Deutsche Luft Hansa received the first two prototypes in 1933 and 1934, and three He 70Ds in 1934 and 10 He 70Gs in 1935.

Japan

- Imperial Japanese Navy Air Service received one aircraft for testing.

Switzerland

- Swissair received a few Heinkel He 70s for express transalpine flights between Zürich and Milan in 1934.

United Kingdom

- Rolls-Royce acquired one He 70G from the RLM in exchange for four Kestrel engines. It was used as an engine testbed.

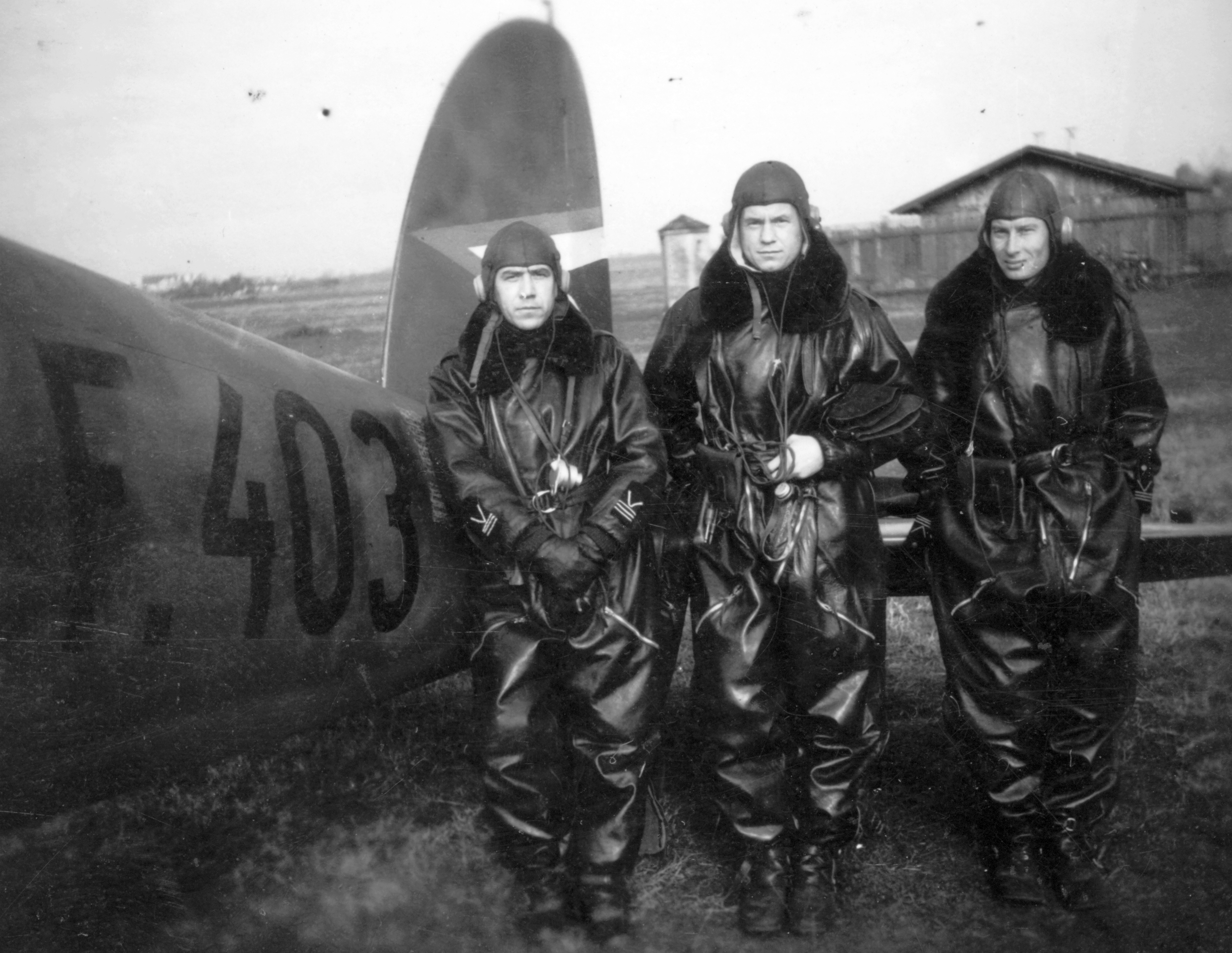
Hungarian pilots with a He 70K

=== Military operators ===
Nazi Germany

- Luftwaffe

Hungary

- The Royal Hungarian Air Force received 18 He 170A aircraft from Germany, powered with licence-built engines.

Spanish State

- The Ejército del Aire received 11 of the 30 aircraft that had served with the Legion Condor.

== Specifications (He 70F-2) ==
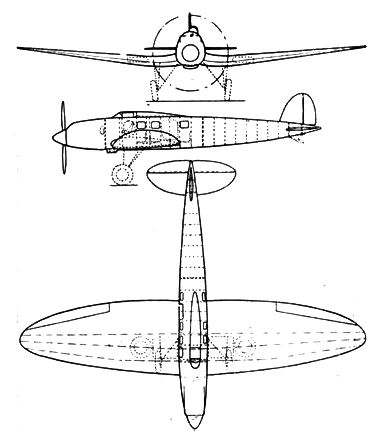
Heinkel He 70 3-view drawing from L'Aerophile April 1933

Data from The Beautiful Blitz

General characteristics

- Crew: three (pilot, radio operator and gunner)
- Length: 11.7 m (38 ft 5 in)
- Wingspan: 14.8 m (48 ft 7 in)
- Height: 3.1 m (10 ft 2 in)
- Wing area: 36.5 m^{2} (393 sq ft)
- Empty weight: 2,360 kg (5,203 lb)
- Gross weight: 3,386 kg (7,465 lb)
- Max takeoff weight: 3,500 kg (7,716 lb)
- Powerplant: 1 × BMW VI 7.3 Z V-12 liquid-cooled piston engine, 550 kW (740 hp)
- Propellers: 2-bladed variable-pitch metal propeller

Performance

- Maximum speed: 360 km/h (220 mph, 190 kn) at sea level
- Cruise speed: 295 km/h (183 mph, 159 kn)
- Range: 1,820 km (1,130 mi, 980 nmi)
- Service ceiling: 6,000 m (20,000 ft)
- Time to altitude:

- 1,000 m (3,300 ft) in two minutes and 30 seconds
- 4,000 m (13,000 ft) in 15 minutes

Armament

- Guns: 1 × 7.92 mm (0.312 in) MG 15 machine gun in the rear cockpit
- Bombs: 6 × 50 kg (110 lb) or 24 x 10 kg (22 lb) bombs internally

== See also ==
Related development

- Heinkel He 112
- Heinkel He 118
- Heinkel He 119

Aircraft of comparable role, configuration, and era

- Airspeed Envoy
- Boeing Monomail
- Breese-Dallas Model 1
- General Aviation/Clarke GA-43
- Junkers Ju 60
- Kharkiv KhAI-1
- Lockheed Model 9 Orion
- Manshū Hayabusa
- Northrop Delta
- Polikarpov/Rafaelyants PR-12
- Tairov OKO-1
- Vultee V-1

Related lists

- List of military aircraft of Germany
