= Kharkiv KhAI-1 =

Airliner

KhAI-1
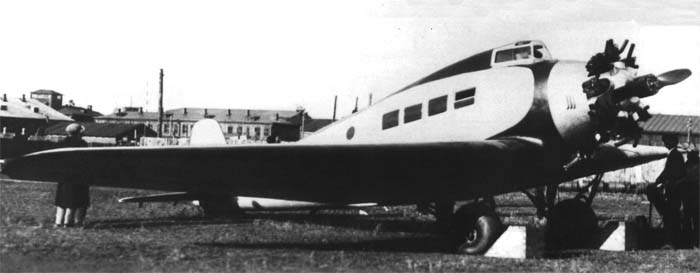

General information
- Type: Airliner
- National origin: Soviet Union
- Manufacturer: Gorky Aviation Plant, Zavod 43, Kharkiv Aviation Factory
- Designer: Kharkiv Aviation Institute
- Primary user: Aeroflot
- Number built: 45

History
- First flight: 8 October 1932

The Kharkiv KhAI-1 (ХАІ-1) was an airliner produced in the Soviet Union in the early 1930s, unusual in that it was designed (and the prototype built) by students. An exceptionally clean design, the KhAI-1 was the first European passenger transport aircraft to feature retractable undercarriage, and boasted a top speed better than the fighter aircraft in service at the time. Some 40 KhAI-1s were operated by Aeroflot, but while a dedicated military version, the KhAI-1VV was developed and flown in prototype form, this did not enter production.

== Development ==
The project was the brainchild of Iosif Nyeman, then head of aircraft construction at the newly formed Kharkiv Aviation Institute. Deciding to provide students with practical, hands-on experience, he divided the students into two teams, each assigned to designing an airliner making use of cheap, easily obtained materials. One team, led by L. D. Arson, was to work on a design incorporating modern techniques and design features designated KhAI-1, while the other, led by A. Eremenko, was to work on a more conservative design designated KhAI-2.^{A} The challenge was laid down in May 1931, and the timeframe specified was that the better design would need to be completed and ready for construction by February the following year. The whole venture was to be supervised by the Ukrainian branch of OSOAVIAKhIM.

Soon, Nyeman selected the KhAI-1 as the design to proceed with. This was a low-wing, cantilever monoplane with a streamlined fuselage of oval cross-section, and retractable undercarriage. Construction was to be wood throughout, with fabric-covered control surfaces. The students were re-organised into ten teams of five to seven members each, and set to work on the detailed design of the aircraft's components and structures. The plans were completed on time, and in March 1932 work began at the Kharkiv Aviation Factory, then home to the design bureau of Nyeman's old mentor, Konstantin Alekseevich Kalinin. Construction of the prototype was undertaken by the students themselves, under the supervision of factory personnel, and was complete within 180 days. The aircraft first flew on 8 October at the hands of Boris Kudrin, with Nyeman on board as a passenger. The aircraft's high speed and good handling quickly became apparent, and following factory trials, the prototype KhAI-1 was flown to Moscow on 17 February 1933 for state acceptance trials, making the flight from Kharkiv in record time. These tests were completed by June, with test pilots I.F.Petrov and P.I.Stefanovskii confirming the aircraft's excellent performance, and recommending it for Aeroflot service, offering as it did a 50% increase in speed over the standard Kalinin K-5 airliner of the day. Nyeman was awarded the Order of the Red Star for the project.

With the KhAI-1 ordered into series production, Nyeman initially requested that this be undertaken at the Kharkiv Aviation Factory, but this facility was gearing up to produce the Kalinin K-7 bomber and therefore lacked the capacity. Instead, production was assigned to the Gorky Aviation Plant (Zavod 21) which was concluding Polikarpov I-5 production. Production examples differed from the prototype in having a larger rudder, enlarged baggage compartment, revised undercarriage with oleo struts, and lighter wheel brakes, The passenger cabin was also revised, with additional sound-proofing and ventilation, and the addition of a lavatory. A revision of the general structure produced a weight saving of 125 kg (275 lb) and an increase in top speed from 292 km/h to 319 km/h (182 mph to 199 mph). However, only three aircraft were built here before the facility was needed to build the Polikarpov I-16 and KhAI-1 production was shifted to Zavod 43 in Kiev, where the rest of the aircraft were built. The first of these flew in November 1934, and airline service trials commenced the following April.

The Soviet Air Force soon expressed interest in the design as an alternative to the Polikarpov R-Z then replacing the Polikarpov R-5 in the reconnaissance-bomber role. A single prototype was built of a KhAI-1VV (for Военный Вариант - Voennii Variant - "Military Variant"), armed with a rear-mounted machine gun, and bombs carried in internal racks. While performance was impressive, the bomb-release mechanism proved troublesome, and as development dragged on, the Air Force gradually lost interest.

== Operational history ==
Following service trials between Moscow and Kyiv, the KhAI-1 was introduced on a regular Aeroflot service in early 1936 between Moscow and Sevastopol. Two accidents occurred during early service. In one, an outer wing panel broke soon after take-off, and in another, an undercarriage strut collapsed on landing. These events led to a review of the design by OKO, leading to general strengthening that added so much weight to the aircraft that one passenger seat had to be sacrificed. Production in Kiev had been suspended during this review, but was soon recommenced. Aeroflot continued using the type on passenger and mail routes until 1940 between Moscow and Kharkiv, Moscow and Minvody, and between Rostov and Krasnodar.

== Variants ==
- KhAI-1 - Passenger transport
- KhAI-1B - (a.k.a. KhAI-1VV), Military variant for bomber training, of which two were converted from KhAI-1, with a 200 kg bomb load, as well as one fixed and one moveable machine-gun.

== Operators ==
Soviet Union

- Aeroflot

== Specifications (KhAI-1 1934 batch) ==
Data from Gunston, Bill (1995). Osprey Encyclopedia of Russian Aircraft 1875-1995. London: Osprey. pp. 148–149.

General characteristics

- Crew: 1 pilot
- Capacity: 6 passengers
- Length: 10.41 m (34 ft 2 in)
- Wingspan: 14.85 m (48 ft 9 in)
- Wing area: 33.2 m^{2} (357 sq ft)
- Empty weight: 1,630 kg (3,590 lb)
- Gross weight: 2,600 kg (5,720 lb)
- Powerplant: 1 × M-22 , 360 kW (480 hp)

Performance

- Maximum speed: 292 km/h (181 mph, 157 kn)
- Range: 1,130 km (700 mi, 610 nmi)
- Service ceiling: 7,200 m (23,620 ft)
- Rate of climb: 3.623 m/s (706.5 ft/min)

== See also ==
Related development

- Kharkiv KhAI-5/51/52/Neman R-10 and PS-5

Aircraft of comparable role, configuration, and era

- Airspeed Envoy
- Heinkel He 70
- Junkers Ju 60
- Lockheed Model 9 Orion
- Manshū Hayabusa
- Northrop Delta
- Polikarpov/Rafaelyants PR-12
- Tairov OKO-1
- Vultee V-1

Related lists

- List of aircraft

== Notes ==
A.This designation was later re-used for an unrelated jet fighter design

== Bibliography ==
- Taylor, Michael J. H. (1989). Jane's Encyclopedia of Aviation. London: Studio Editions. p. 560.
- Gunston, Bill (1995). Osprey Encyclopedia of Russian Aircraft 1875-1995. London: Osprey. pp. 148–149.
