= Junkers Ju 160 =

Passenger transport aircraft

Ju 160
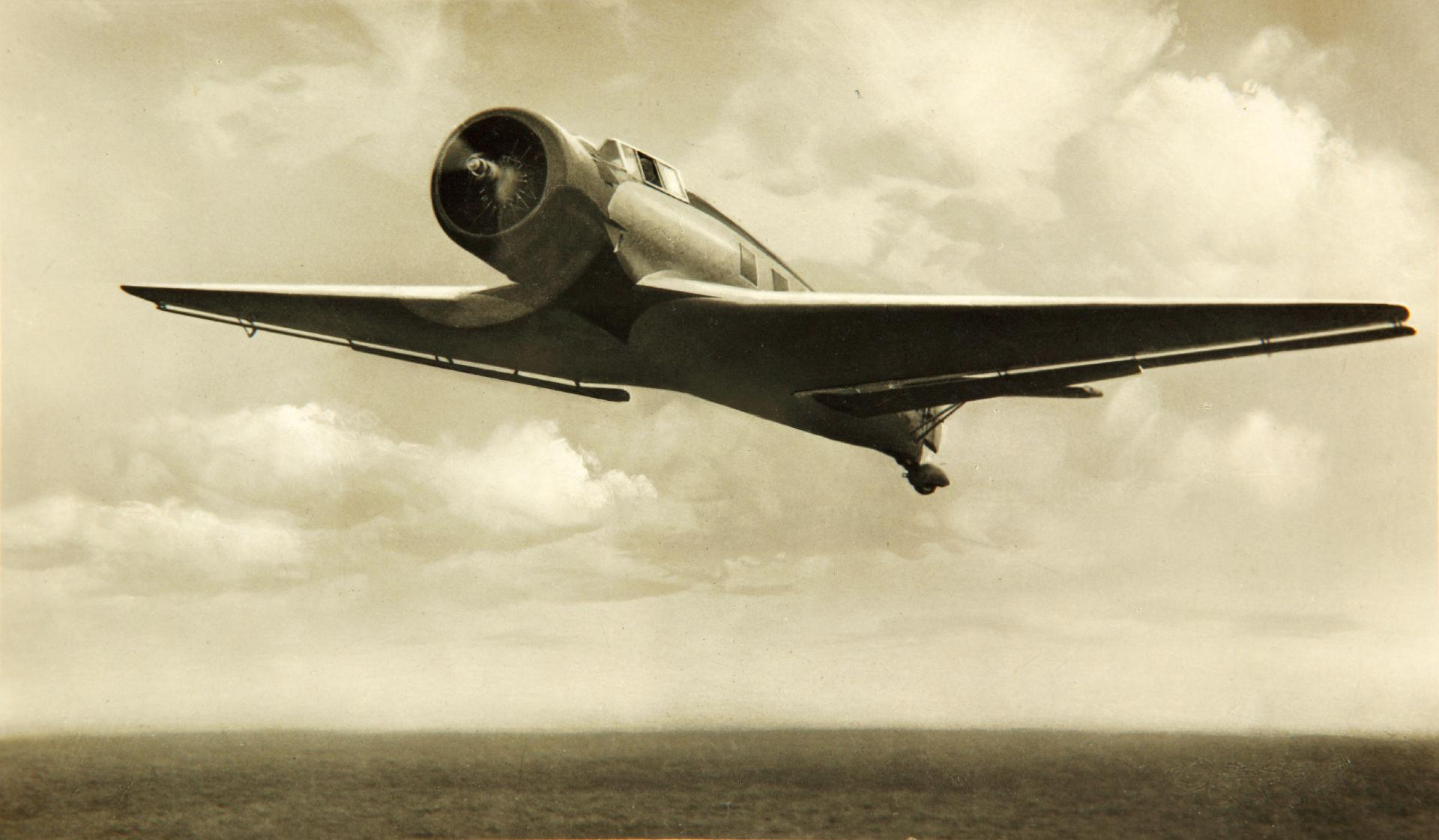

General information
- Type: Small fast passenger transport
- Manufacturer: Junkers
- Primary users: Deutsche Lufthansa Luftwaffe; Imperial Japanese Navy Air Service
- Number built: 47

History
- Introduction date: 1935
- First flight: 30 January 1934

The Junkers Ju 160 was a single-engine low-wing passenger transport aircraft designed and produced by the German aircraft manufacturer Junkers

Derived from the Ju 60, the Ju 160 was targeted at the same fast airliner market as the Heinkel He 70 Blitz and the Lockheed Model 9 Orion. The German flag carrier Deutsche Lufthansa has commissioned the unsuccessful Ju 60; Junkers decided to design an improved derivative in 1934. Capable of seating up to six passengers and operated by a crew of two, the Ju 160 benefitted from the adoption of a new wing, a more powerful engine, and an aerodynamically cleaner exterior (which included an inwards-retracting undercarriage). The first prototype was taken from the Ju 60's assembly line.

The German flag carrier Deutsche Lufthansa operated a fleet of at least 20 aircraft, which it used largely on internal routes. Several other airlines also procured the Ju 160, including Weser Flugbau and at least one Manchurian operator. The type commenced civil operations in 1935 and was operating some of Deutsche Lufthansa's routes as late as 1941. Following the start of the Second World War, the Luftwaffe opted to impress the majority of civil Ju 160s in Germany; in a military capacity, the aircraft was largely used for communication and training purposes.

== Design and development ==
The origins of the Ju 160 are directly tied to that of the preceding Junkers Ju 60 of the early 1930s. The development of this aircraft had been commissioned by the German flag carrier Deutsche Lufthansa in response to the arrival of the American Lockheed Model 9 Orion at rival airline Swissair. The Ju 60 made it into flight and was formally evaluated by the airline, but it quickly became clear that the Ju 60 was unable to match the top speeds of rival aircraft, such as the Heinkel He 70 Blitz. Having proven to be uncompetitive, only two Ju 60s were ever completed. Nevertheless, during 1934, design work commenced on an improved variant of the Ju 60, which received the designation Ju 160.

Akin to the Ju 60 and Junkers' established design convention, the Ju 160 was a low-wing cantilever aircraft. While the Ju 160 shared the same general configuration and many similarities with the preceding Ju 60, it featured numerous changes aimed at bolstering its performance. The Ju 160 was cleaned up aerodynamically, and was outfitted with a more powerful BMW 132A radial engine (capable of producing up to 490 kW (660 hp); this combination was able to make the aircraft roughly 72 km/h (45 mph) faster that its predecessor.

One of the more noticeable changes was the adoption of a new wing, which possessed a swept leading edge and a straight trailing edge. A Junkers-style double-wing formed both the ailerons and flaps. The wing planform was also revised to have taper only on the leading edge. These wings were built around a twin spars and were covered in sheet duralumin. Smooth metal sheeting was used across the entirety of the exterior of the Ju 160 while the Ju 60 had used Junkers' traditional corrugated skin across the wings and some areas around the tail. A further visual difference between the two aircraft was that the Ju 60 had four cabin windows on either side of the fuselage while the Ju 160 had only three on either side. The Ju 160 featured an inwards-retracting main undercarriage.

Other aerodynamic improvements of the Ju 160 included the cockpit enclosure being better faired into the fuselage. Seating was for six passengers in two forward-facing and one rear-facing pairs. The crew, comprising a pilot and radio operator, sat in tandem within an enclosed cockpit. While designed to be typically flown by a single pilot, a folding control column and other flight controls was provisioned for a second pilot to be seated starboard of the pilot.

The first prototype Ju 160 V1, D-UNOR, was taken from the Ju 60 assembly line. Deutsch Lufthansa formally evaluated this aircraft; following trials, a number of changes were made to the final prototype (V3), which included a wider chord, a reduced depth rudder, a faired tailwheel, and minor modifications to the exterior door. The second prototype (V2) was for a military version.

The first civil production series were designated Ju 160A-0.

== Operational history ==
Including prototypes, 47 Ju 160s were produced. Deutsch Lufthansa were the primarily commercial operator of the type, receiving at least 20 production standard aircraft. During 1935 alone, the airline's fleet was being flown on 13 separate domestic routes. Furthermore, Deutsch Lufthansa Ju 160 was also used on some international routes, such as between Breslau and Prague.

The Ju 160 stayed in service on Deutsch Lufthansa's fast route between Berlin and Vienna until 1941. One of the Ju 160s was initially operated by the Lufthansa subsidiary Eurasia; this aircraft, however, crashed in Shanghai and was taken back to Germany for repairs and was later flown by to Deutsch Lufthansa. The first 11 Lufthansa aircraft were Ju 160 A-0s registered in 1935, followed by 10 D-0s in 1936; the latter version featured enlarged cockpit windows and other crew comfort enhancements. Weser Flugbau operated an ex-Lufthansa aircraft. Two aircraft also appeared on the Manchurian civil register, one of then having earlier been registered in Germany, the other sold directly. The Manchurian aircraft appear to have ended up in Japan.

The German Research Institute for Aviation (Deutsche Versuchsanstalt fur Luftfahrt e.V ) operated four Ju 160s. Five others operated at the Flight Research Centre (E-Stelle) at Travemünde. The remaining aircraft were mostly military versions. The majority of the surviving civilian Ju 160s in Germany were eventually impressed in Luftwaffe service shortly following the outbreak of the Second World War. They were used to conduct training and communications missions.

== Operators ==
Germany

- Deutsche Lufthansa
- Luftwaffe

Japan

- Imperial Japanese Navy Air Service as the "LXJ"

== Specifications (Ju 160) ==
Data from German Aircraft of the Second World War

General characteristics

- Crew: two
- Capacity: six passengers
- Length: 12 m (39 ft 4 in)
- Wingspan: 14.32 m (47 ft 0 in)
- Height: 4 m (13 ft 1 in)
- Wing area: 34.8 m^{2} (375 sq ft)
- Empty weight: 2,320 kg (5,115 lb)
- Powerplant: 1 × BMW 132A nine-cylinder air-cooled radial piston engine, 490 kW (660 hp)
- Propellers: 2-bladed variable-pitch propeller

Performance

- Maximum speed: 340 km/h (210 mph, 180 kn)
- Cruise speed: 315 km/h (196 mph, 170 kn)
- Range: 1,200 km (750 mi, 650 nmi) at 1,900 m (6,200 ft)
- Endurance: three hours and 12 minutes
- Service ceiling: 5,200 m (17,100 ft)
- Wing loading: 66.7 kg/m^{2} (13.7 lb/sq ft)
- Power/mass: 0.14 kW/kg (0.085 hp/lb)

== See also ==
Related development

- Junkers Ju 60

Aircraft of comparable role, configuration, and era

- Heinkel He 70 Blitz
- Lockheed Model 9 Orion

Related lists

- List of military aircraft of Germany
