= RCAF Station Sea Island =

- Near Vancouver, British Columbia in Canada

Site information
- Owner: Department of National Defence (Canada) and Department of Transport (Canada)

Location
- Coordinates: 49°11′N 123°10′W

Airfield information
- Elevation: Sea Level (0 feet (0 m)) AMSL
Runways
Direction	Length and surface
7/25	5,050 feet (1,539 m) Hard Surface
11/29	5,000 feet (1,524 m) Hard Surface
2/20	3,850 feet (1,173 m) Hard Surface

RCAF Station Sea Island was a World War II, British Commonwealth Air Training Plan station located near Vancouver, British Columbia.

== History ==
=== World War II ===
No 8 Elementary Flying Training School (EFTS) formed here on 22 July 1940.

==== Aerodrome information ====
In approximately 1942 the aerodrome was listed at 49°11′N 123°10′W with a Var. 24 degrees E and elevation of Sea level. The aerodrome was listed as under construction usable and three runways were listed as follows:

Runway Name	Length	Width	Surface
7/25	5,050 feet (1,539 m)	200 feet (61 m)	Hard surfaced
11/29	5,000 feet (1,524 m)	200 feet (61 m)	Hard surfaced
2/20	3,850 feet (1,173 m)	150 feet (46 m)	Hard surfaced

=== Postwar ===
After the war the station was renamed RCAF Station Vancouver.

No 442 Squadron was re-activated as No 442 "City of Vancouver" Auxiliary Fighter Squadron at Sea Island 15 April 1946, but was later re-designated an Auxiliary Transport Squadron. No 123 Rescue Flight and NO 121 Composite Flight (KU) were also formed at Sea Island.

On 1 December 1951, No 442 Squadron was split in half to form No 443 "City of New Westminster" Squadron.

RCAF Station Vancouver closed on 31 March 1964.

Today this area is the site of Vancouver International Airport.
