= Northrop Delta =

1933 transport monoplane family by Northrop

Delta
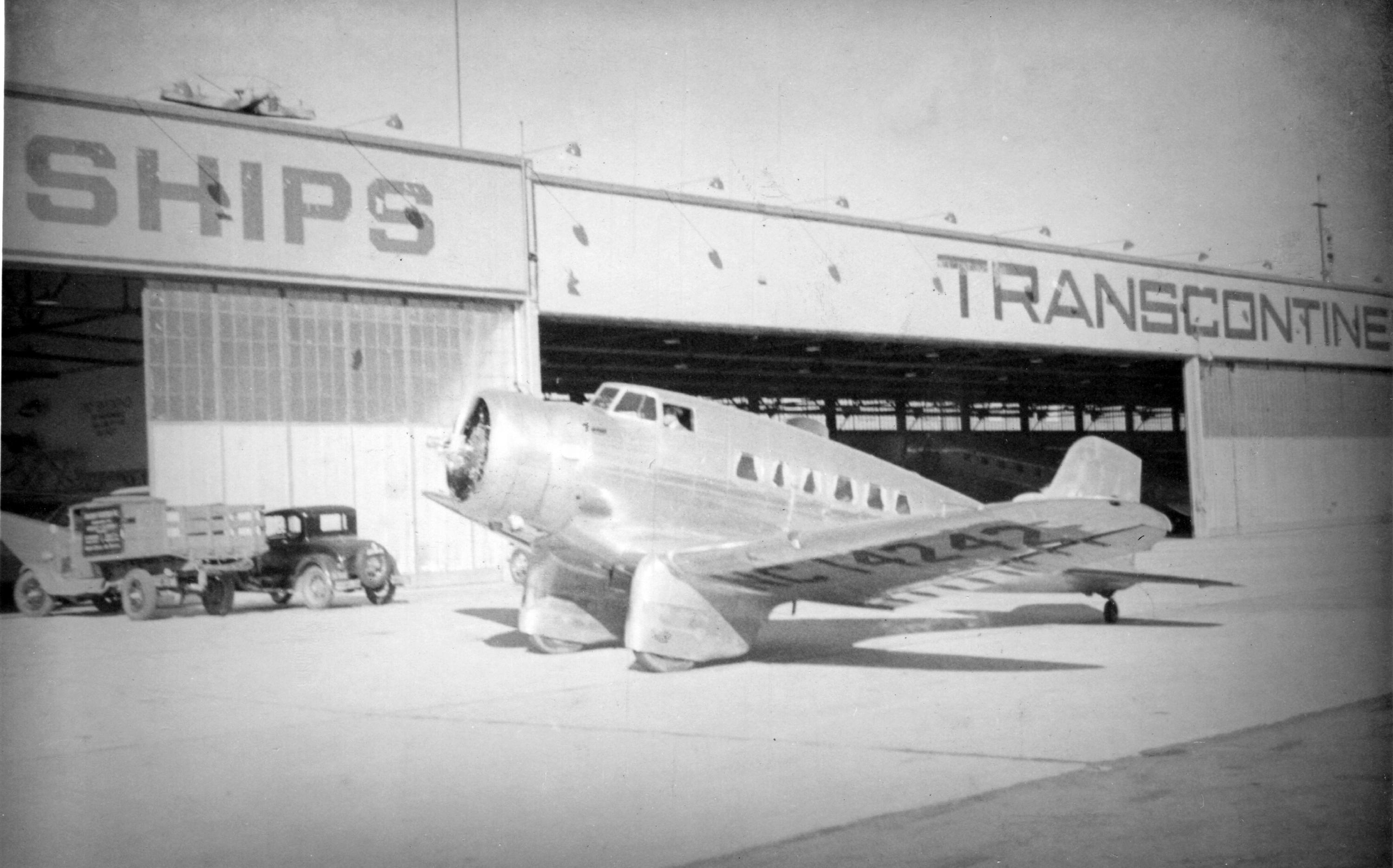

General information
- Type: Transport aircraft
- Manufacturer: Northrop Corporation
- Designer: Jack Northrop
- Primary user: Royal Canadian Air Force
- Number built: 32

History
- First flight: May 1933
- Developed from: Northrop Gamma

The Northrop Delta was an American single-engined passenger transport aircraft of the 1930s. Closely related to Northrop's Gamma mail plane, 13 were produced by the Northrop Corporation, followed by 19 aircraft built under license by Canadian Vickers Limited.

== Development and design ==
When Jack Northrop set up the Northrop Corporation as a joint venture with the Douglas Aircraft Company in 1932, he set out to design two closely related single-engined aircraft as the new company's first products: a mailplane/record-breaking aircraft, which was designated the Gamma, and a passenger transport, the Delta. The Delta was a low-winged monoplane, with a fixed tailwheel undercarriage. It was of all-metal, stressed-skin construction, with streamlining spats covering the main landing gear. While the Delta's wings were common with those of the Gamma, it had a new, wider fuselage, which seated the pilot in an enclosed cockpit immediately behind the engine, and had accommodation for eight passengers in a cabin behind the pilot.

The first Delta was flown in May 1933, and received an airworthiness certificate in August that year.

== Operational history ==
Although it was intended that the Delta would be sold in both airliner and executive transport (initially named "Victoria") versions, a change to the regulations governing commercial air transport in the United States in October 1934, prohibiting the use of single-engined aircraft to carry passengers at night or over rough terrain which would prevent a forced landing, stopped the market for single-engined airliners in the United States, and only three aircraft, all ordered before the passing of this regulation, were built as airliners. These consisted of the prototype, leased to Trans World Airlines for use to carry airmail, which crashed on 10 November 1933, one sold to Pan-Am for use by its Mexican subsidiary, destroyed by a fire in May 1934 and one sold to AB Aerotransport of Sweden, delivered in April 1934. AB Aerotransport purchased a second Delta, but this was a dedicated mailplane which more closely resembled the Gamma, with a slim fuselage carrying its cargo in a compartment ahead of the cockpit.

A single aircraft was built for the United States Coast Guard. Designated the Northrop RT-1, this was used as the personal transport of Henry Morgenthau Jr., the Secretary of the Treasury and as a staff transport. Seven more aircraft were built as executive transports for private owners. Of these, three were purchased by the Spanish Republicans for use in the Spanish Civil War. Two of these aircraft were captured by the Nationalists when the ship carrying them (along with four Vultee V-1s, a Fairchild 91 and a Lockheed Electra) was captured at sea. These two Deltas were used as Transports by Franco's forces, while the third Delta was used by the Republican airline Lineas Aéreas Postales Españolas (LAPE) until the end of the civil war when it was handed over to Franco's air force.

In 1935, Canada selected the Delta for use as a photographic survey aircraft for use by the Royal Canadian Air Force (RCAF), to be built by Canadian Vickers under license. One aircraft, the last Delta built by Northrop, was supplied as a part assembled pattern to Canadian Vickers, first flying on 16 August 1936 and being delivered to the RCAF on 1 September that year. It was followed by a further 19 aircraft built wholly by Canadian Vickers, production continuing until October 1940. The Northrop Delta was the first completely all-metal, stressed-skin aircraft built in Canada, however it was closely preceded by the Fairchild Super 71, whose stressed skin construction was limited to the fuselage and not the flying surfaces.

The Deltas, which were capable of being operated from wheeled, ski or float undercarriages, proved capable survey aircraft, well suited to operations in the north of Canada, but in August 1939, when the outbreak of the Second World War loomed, Canada found itself short of coastal patrol aircraft, and the Deltas were diverted to this role, being fitted with floats and carrying out long anti-submarine missions. The Deltas were less successful as patrol floatplanes, as they were damaged by ocean swell and by salt water corrosion, and they were forced to revert to landplane use after two months. The Delta was withdrawn from operations in late 1941, then being used as instructional airframes in training schools.

== Variants ==
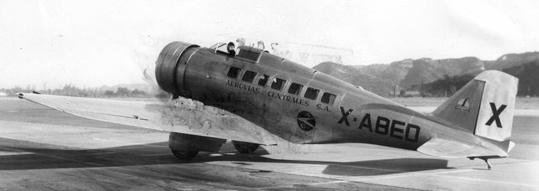
Northrop Delta 1B in Mexican service with Aerovias Centrales

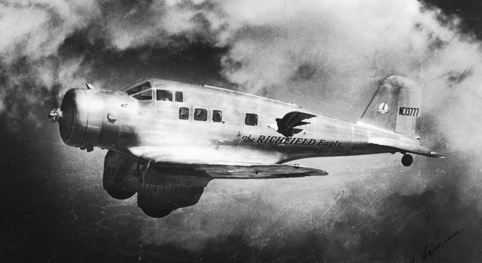
Northrop Delta 1D flown by the Richfield Oil Company

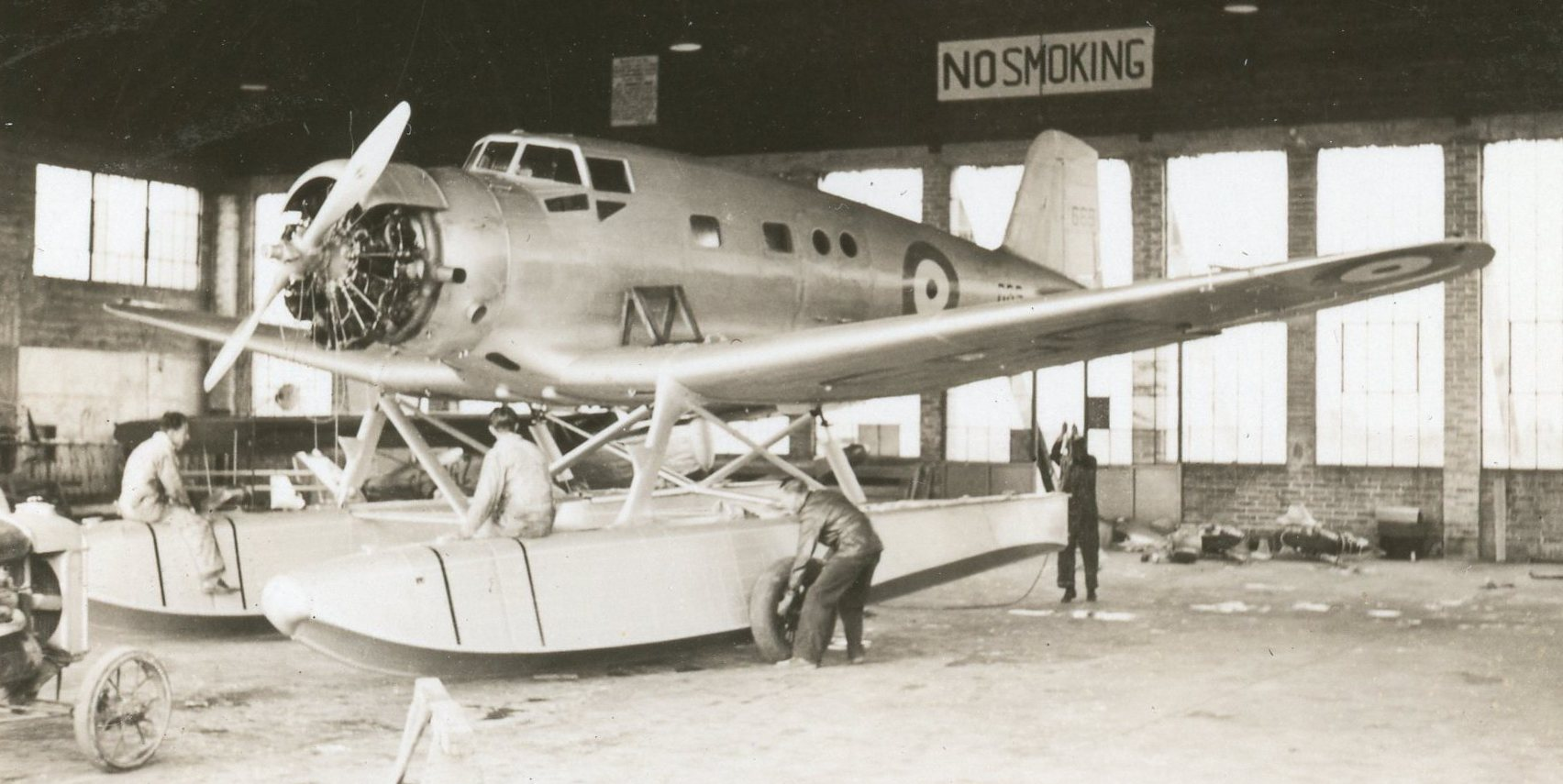
RCAF Canadian Vickers-built Northrop Delta Mk.I

Delta 1A
Prototype. Powered by 710 hp (530 kW) Wright SR-1820-F3 Cyclone radial engine. One built.
Delta 1B
Passenger airliner for Pan-Am. Powered by 660 hp (490 kW) Pratt & Whitney Hornet. One built.
Delta 1C
Passenger airliner for AN Aerotransport. Powered by 700 hp (520 kW) Hornet.
Delta 1D
Executive aircraft, powered by Cyclone or Hornet engines. Eight built, including one Northrop RT-1, powered by 735 hp (548 kW) Cyclone for United States Coast Guard.
Delta 1E
Airmail carrier for AB Aerotransport. One built. Powered by 660 hp (490 kW) Hornet.
Delta I
Survey aircraft for RCAF. Powered by 775 hp (578 kW) SR-1820-F52 Cyclone. Three built, including pattern aircraft and two license built. Based on the 1D-8.
Delta IA
Partial modification to Mk.II standards, with bomb racks fitted.
Delta II
Revised version with provision for armament, including bombs, a dorsal turret mounting a .30 in Browning machine gun (later removed) and two wing mounted machine guns. Nine built.
Delta III
Unofficial designation for Mk.II fitted with enlarged tail surfaces to counter tail buffeting from turret. Eight built.
RT-1
United States Coast Guard designation for its sole Delta 1D-7, which was named "Golden Goose".

== Military operators ==
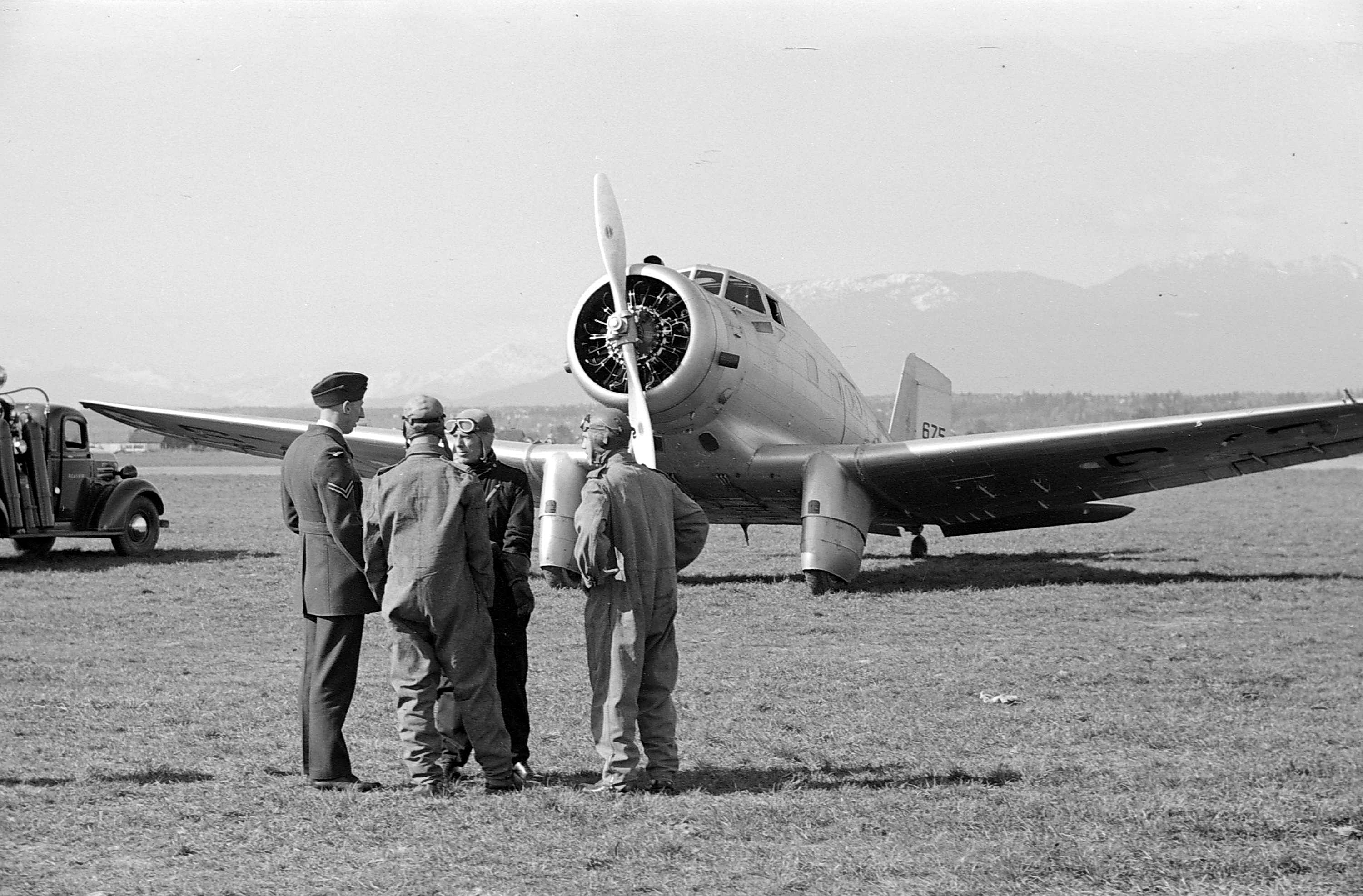
Canadian Northrop Delta in 1939

Australia

- Royal Australian Air Force – Operated one impressed Delta from December 1942 to September 1943.

Canada

- Royal Canadian Air Force
  - No. 8 Squadron RCAF
  - No. 119 Squadron RCAF
  - No. 120 Squadron RCAF

Spain

- Spanish Republican Air Force – ex-Swedish Northrop 1C Delta with LAPE
- Nationalist Air Force - Northrop 1D Delta captured on Mar Cantabrico

United States

- United States Coast Guard

== Civil operators ==
Australia

- Civil Aviation Authority of Australia

Mexico

- Aerovias Centrales SA (a Pan-Am Subsidiary)

Sweden

- AB Aerotransport (now part of SAS)

United States

- Trans World Airlines (aka TWA)
- Honeywell (executive aircraft)
- Richfield (executive aircraft)

== Specifications (Delta 1D-5) ==
Data from McDonnell Douglas Aircraft since 1920

General characteristics

- Crew: 1
- Capacity: 8 Passengers (passenger variants)
- Length: 33 ft 1 in (10.08 m)
- Wingspan: 47 ft 9 in (14.55 m)
- Height: 10 ft 1 in (3.07 m)
- Wing area: 363 sq ft (33.7 m^{2})
- Empty weight: 4,504 lb (2,059 kg)
- Gross weight: 7,350 lb (3,334 kg)
- Powerplant: 1 × Wright SR-1820-F2 Nine-cylinder air-cooled radial engine, 735 hp (548 kW)

Performance

- Maximum speed: 190 kn (219 mph, 352 km/h) at 6,300 ft (1,920 m)
- Cruise speed: 174 kn (200 mph, 332 km/h)
- Range: 1,435 nmi (1,650 mi, 2,655 km)
- Service ceiling: 20,000 ft (6,095 m)
- Rate of climb: 1,200 ft/min (6.1 m/s)
- Wing loading: 20.2 lb/sq ft (98.9 kg/m^{2})
- Power/mass: 0.10 hp/lb (0.16 kW/kg)

== See also ==
Related development

- Northrop Alpha
- Northrop Beta
- Northrop 8A
- Northrop N-3PB
- Northrop BT-1
- Northrop Gamma

Aircraft of comparable role, configuration, and era

- Airspeed Envoy
- Boeing Monomail
- Breese-Dallas Model 1
- General Aviation/Clarke GA-43
- Heinkel He 70
- Junkers Ju 60
- Kharkiv KhAI-1
- Lockheed Model 9 Orion
- Manshū Hayabusa
- Polikarpov/Rafaelyants PR-12
- Tairov OKO-1
- Vultee V-1

Related lists

- List of aircraft of World War II
- List of aircraft of the Canadian Air Force
