= Vultee V-1 =

Vultee small propeller airliner introduced in 1934

V-1
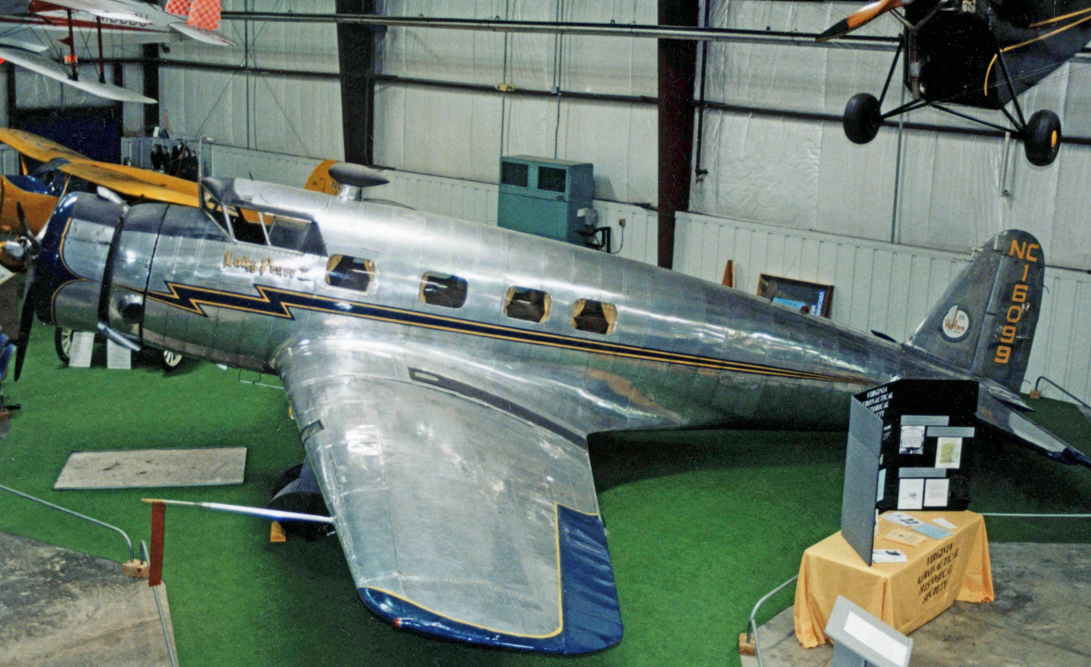
- The sole V-1AD Special owned by Randolph Hearst and now preserved in the Shannon Air Museum.

General information
- Type: Eight-passenger transport
- Manufacturer: Airplane Development Corporation
- Designer: Gerard Vultee
- Status: Retired
- Primary users: Spanish Republican Air Force American Airlines and LAPE
- Number built: 25 (including prototype)

History
- Manufactured: 1933–1936
- Introduction date: 1934
- First flight: 19 February 1933
- Developed into: Vultee V-11

The Vultee V-1 is a 1930s American single-engined airliner built by the Airplane Development Corporation, designed by Gerard Vultee and financed by automobile manufacturer Errett Cord.

== Design and development ==
On 19 February 1933, the V-1 prototype first flew. According to Jonathan Thompson, "Exceedingly clean in appearance, with an oval monocoque fuselage, a two-spar, 48-foot wing and landing gear retracting inward to lie flush within the center section, the 4275-lb transport was also extremely efficient, carrying the pilot and eight passengers 750 miles at a cruising speed of 195 mph.

The revised design production aircraft were designated the V-1A. American Airlines, the initial customer, required a crew of two, a raised fuselage roof line, increased wingspan, electrically operated split flaps, and the Wright R-1820 Cyclone engines increased from 650-hp to 735-hp. Range improved to 1000 miles with a cruising speed of 225 mph. Production ended in 1936 after 27 aircraft had been built.

A floatplane version was sold to the Soviet Union as the V-1AS, while an deluxe executive transport version, the V-1AD, was used by Cord, oil and gas companies, and the San Francisco Examiner.

== Operational history ==
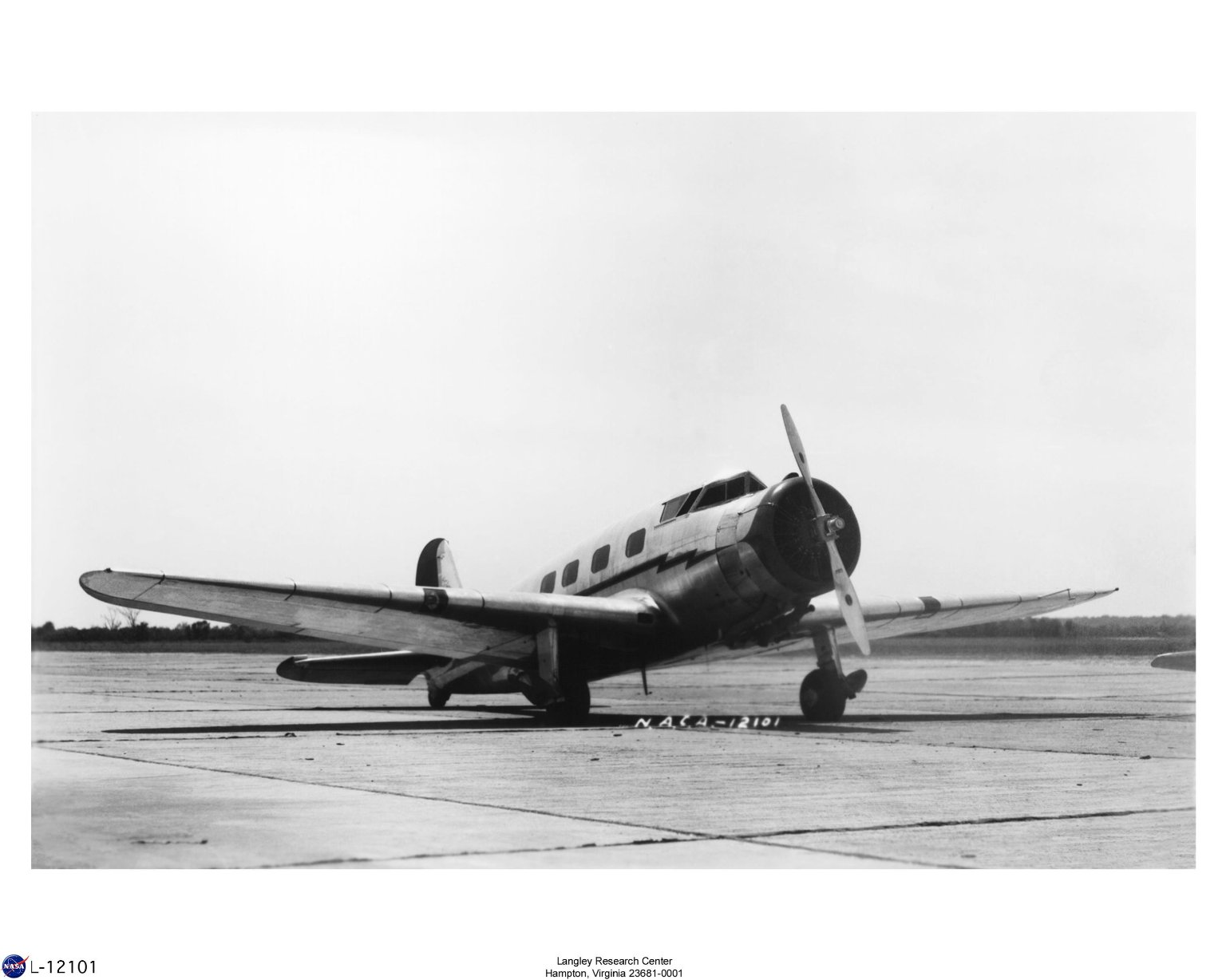
Vultee V-1A at Langley

American Airlines bought at least 13 V-1As and the V-1 prototype (after it had been modified for two pilot operation) and they entered service in 1934. On introduction, they were the fastest commercial airliners of their day. They were used on routes from the Great Lakes to Texas. Bowen Airlines of Texas also operated the type. By 1936, they were sold, having been replaced with twin-engined aircraft when the Bureau of Air Commerce severely limited the use of single engine airliners.

V-1ADs were operated by several private companies or individuals as high-speed executive aircraft. The sole V-1AD Special was used prewar by newspaper magnate Randolph Hearst. It later served airlines in Panama and Nicaragua before returning to the United States postwar.

In January 1935, Jimmy Doolittle set a transcontinental record in a V-1A called the Lady Peace.

A V-1AD was used in 1936 during an attempt at the first New York-London-New York double crossing, flown by Harry Richman and Henry T. "Dick" Merrill, in the famous "Ping Pong" flight, when to ensure buoyancy in case of ditching, empty spaces in the aircraft were filled with ping pong balls.

Sixteen V-1A and V-1AD aircraft were used by both sides in the Spanish Civil War. Seven former American Airlines aircraft, plus eight others were used by the Republicans in the Spanish Civil War, with machine guns and under-fuselage bomb racks fitted. Four of the aircraft were captured by the Nationalists.

On August 6, 1936 Sigizmund Levanevsky and Левченко, Виктор Иванович began an 11,800+ mile multistage flight from Los Angeles to Moscow in a Vultee V-1A floatplane. They arrived in Moscow in on September 11. For this flight Levanevsky was awarded with Order of the Red Banner of Labour, while Levchenko with given the Order of Lenin. A greeting telegram to the pilots was sent by Otto Schmidt, who was at that time on the icebreaker "Litke" and was making a through passage along the Northern Sea Route

The V-1 was used in the filming of It Happened One Night (1934), Jungle Queen (1944) with Clark Gable, and The Tarnished Angels (1957).

== Variants ==
V-1
Prototype with a 650 hp (485 kW) Wright SR-1820-F2 Cyclone engine, one built, later modified to V-1A standard before delivery to American Airlines.
V-1A
Production variant with two crew and a 735 hp (548 kW) Wright Cyclone R-1820-F2 radial engine, 18-built and one converted from prototype.
V-1AD
Deluxe executive variant with a 850 hp (634 kW) Wright Cyclone R-1820-G2 radial engine, six built.
V-1AD Special
As V-1AD but fitted with a 1,000 hp (746 kW) Wright Cyclone R-1820-G2 radial engine, one built.
V-1AS Special
Special variant with either 775 hp (578 kW) R-1820-F52 or 850 hp (634 kW) R-1820-G2 radial engine, with twin floats, one built for the Russian government.

== Operators ==
Spanish Republic

- Spanish Republican Air Force – Republican Spain purchased 16 V-1s from various sources, including 10 from American Airlines. At least one was destroyed by sabotage before delivery and four more were seized by Nationalists during delivery.

Nationalist Spain

- Aviación Nacional

=== Civil operators ===
Canada

- Canadian Colonial Airways

China

- China National Aviation Corporation

United States

- American Airlines (1 V-1 and 10 V-1A)
- Bowen Airlines
- Crusader Oil Corporation
- William Randolph Hearst

== Surviving aircraft ==
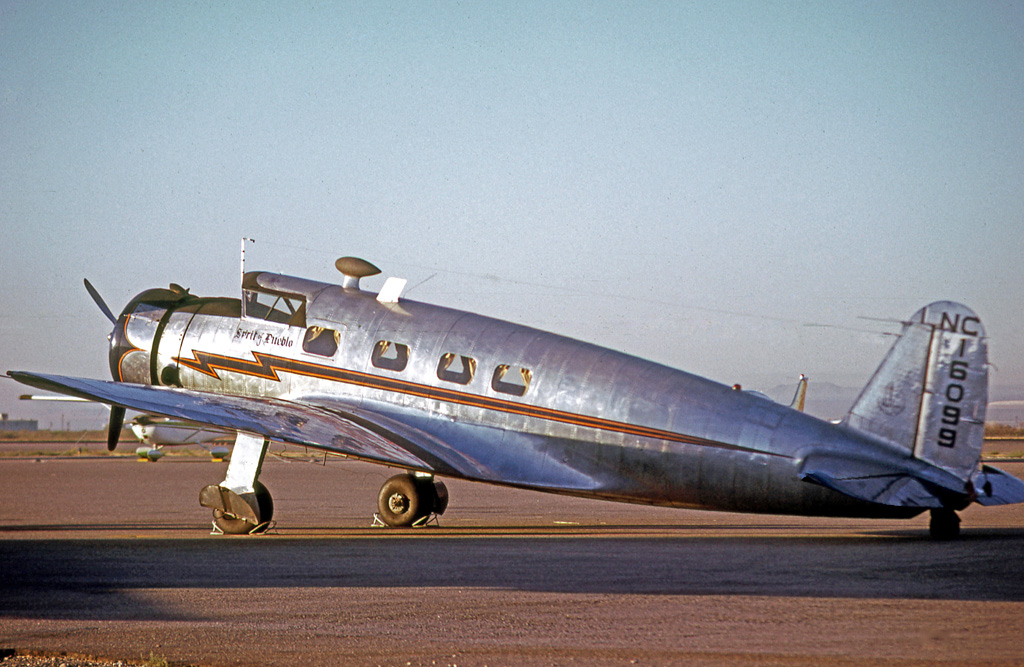
The Vultee V-1AD Special NC16099 in 1973 after restoration and named Spirit of Pueblo

The V-1AD Special NC16099 is the sole survivor of the type and is preserved on public display at Shannon Air Museum in Fredericksburg, Virginia. It is painted as Lady Peace II to commemorate the original Lady Peace used for the double crossing attempt. It was restored and flown in 1971 by Harold Johnston from Colorado.

== Specifications (V-1A) ==
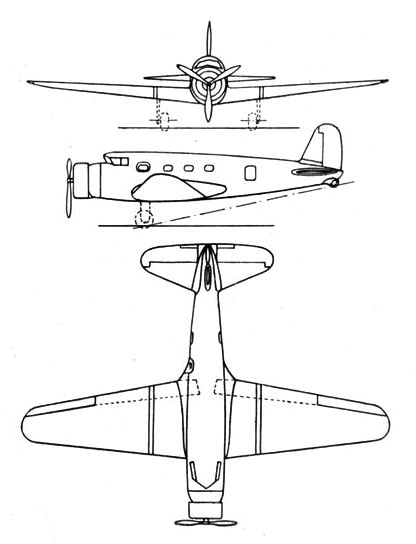
Vultee V-1A 3-view drawing from L'Aerophile July 1934

Data from General Dynamic Aircraft and their Predecessors

General characteristics

- Crew: 2
- Capacity: 8 passengers
- Length: 37 ft 0 in (11.28 m)
- Wingspan: 50 ft 0 in (15.24 m)
- Height: 10 ft 2 in (3.10 m)
- Wing area: 348 sq ft (32.3 m^{2})
- Empty weight: 5,332 lb (2,424 kg)
- Gross weight: 8,500 lb (3,864 kg)
- Powerplant: 1 × Wright Cyclone R-1820-F2 , 735 hp (548 kW)

Performance

- Maximum speed: 235 mph (378 km/h, 204 kn)
- Cruise speed: 215 mph (346 km/h, 187 kn)
- Range: 1,000 mi (1,610 km, 870 nmi)
- Service ceiling: 20,000 ft (6,100 m)
- Rate of climb: 1,000 ft/min (5.1 m/s)

== See also ==
Related development

- Vultee V-11

Aircraft of comparable role, configuration, and era

- Airspeed Envoy
- Breese-Dallas Model 1
- General Aviation GA-43
- Heinkel He 70
- Junkers Ju 60
- Kharkiv KhAI-1
- Lockheed Model 9 Orion
- Manshū Hayabusa
- Polikarpov/Rafaelyants PR-12
- Tairov OKO-1
- Northrop Delta
