= Khaz =

Khaz may refer to:

- Khaz-e Bahari, village in Khash County, Sistan and Baluchestan Province, Iran
- Khaz Pari, village in Mirjaveh County, Sistan and Baluchestan Province, Iran
- Khaz-e Bala, village in Khuzestan Province, Iran
- Khaz Oruzgan, village in Afghanistan where the 2008 Battle of Khaz Oruzgan took place
- Khaz'al al-Ka'bi (1863–1936), Emir of the Sheikhdom of Mohammerah, now part of the Khuzestan Province, Iran
- Khaz-Bulat Askar-Sarydzha (1900–1982), Soviet Dagestani sculptor
- Khaz (musician), stage name of trance musician Carey Stansfield active circa 2010
- Khaz (notation), plural: "khazes", traditional Armenian neumes, a set of special signs constituting a system of musical notation known in Armenia at least since the 8th century
- Khazz silk, a term used to describe different types of silk products at various points in history

KhAZ may refer to:

- KhAZ (Russian: ХАЗ), short for Khakas Aluminium Smelter (Russian: Хакасский Алюминиевый Завод), major aluminium smelter located near Sayanogorsk, Russia
- KhAZ (Russian: ХАЗ), short for Kharkov Aviation Factory (Russian: Харьковский Авиационный Завод), historical name of the Kharkov State Aircraft Manufacturing Company, aircraft manufacturer in Kharkov, Ukraine

- KhAZ-30 (formerly known as KhAZ ViS-3 and KhAZ ViS-5), high wing, single-engine ultralight aircraft produced in Kharkov since 2012

KHAZ may refer to:

- KHAZ, call sign for the 99.5 FM frequency radio station in the U.S. state of Kansas

See also:

- Khazz, the head of the Muslims living in the Khazar Khanate
- Haz, Yemen
- HAZ (disambiguation)
