= Kharkiv State Aircraft Manufacturing Company =

Ukrainian aircraft manufacturing company

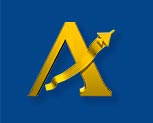
- Native name: Ха́рківське держа́вне авіаці́йне виробни́че підприємс́тво
- Type: State-owned
- Industry: Aircraft industry
- Founded: September 17, 1926; 100 years ago, in Kharkov, Ukrainian SSR
- Headquarters: Kharkiv, Ukraine
- Products: passenger, transport, military transport aircraft construction
- Revenue: ▼ ₴10,457,000 (2025)
- Net income: ▼ ₴ -13,461,000 (2025)
- Total assets: ▼ ₴ 2.21 billion (2025)
- Total equity: ▼ ₴ -1.48 billion (2025)
- Number of employees: ▲169 (2025)
- Parent: Ukroboronprom
- Website: www.ksamc.com/eng/
- Footnotes; Financials as of 2025; References

Kharkiv State Aircraft Manufacturing Company or Kharkiv Aviation Factory (KSAMC or KhAZ; Ukrainian: Ха́рківське держа́вне авіаці́йне виробни́че підприємс́тво) is a Ukrainian aircraft manufacturing company. During the Soviet era, the plant was known as Aircraft Production Plant 135 and the Central Intelligence Agency classified it as Kharkiv Airframe Plant 135.

== History ==
=== Soviet Union ===
KhAZ was established on September 17, 1926, following the foundation of Kharkiv aircraft repair facilities, which had been established in 1923. These facilities were originally constructed by the German aviation company Junkers Flugzeug und Motorenwerke AG prior to Adolf Hitler's rise to power. This undertaking was part of Weimar Germany's strategy to conceal its military cooperation with the Soviet Union, aiming to circumvent the limitations imposed on the German Armed Forces by the Treaty of Versailles.

The manufacturing facility has its own aerodrome, known as Kharkiv North Airport (ICAO: UKHV), alternatively recognized as Kharkiv Sokilnyky Airport.

=== Ukraine ===
In 2014, the last production aircraft built at the Kharkiv Aviation Factory, an Antonov An-74T-200A, was delivered to the Kazakh Border Service.

On 6 November 2019, Ukrainian President Volodymyr Zelenskyy visited the Kharkiv Aviation Factory as well as the Malyshev Factory while on a tour of Ukrboronprom facilities in Kharkiv. The President was reportedly "shocked" at the low salaries, deprived working conditions and lack of production, asking "Why we have beautiful planes and engineers, only we do not manufacture anything and nothing flies". Zelenskyy ordered the newly appointed head of Ukroboronprom Aivaras Abromavičius to report on the state of affairs of the concern, and advised the Economy and Finance to prepare a five-year aviation industry program, with a priority on wage arrears and a settlement on the struggling companies bankruptcy case. It was reported that the average salary at the factory was 3.5 thousand UAH, the lowest out of all Ukrboronprom enterprises.

== Notable aircraft ==
=== Fighters ===
- Grigorovich I-Z
- Grigorovich IP-1
- Mikoyan-Gurevich MiG-15
- Sukhoi Su-2

==== Trainer ====
- Yakovlev Yak-18

=== Transport ===
- Antonov An-72
- Antonov An-74
- Antonov An-140

=== Passenger ===
- Kalinin K-2
- Kalinin K-3
- Kalinin K-4
- Kalinin K-5
- Tupolev Tu-104
- Tupolev Tu-124
- Tupolev Tu-134

=== Drone ===
- Tupolev Tu-141

=== Ultralight ===
- KhAZ ViS-3

=== Experimental ===
- Kalinin K-7
- Kharkiv KhAI-1
- Kharkiv KhAI-4
- Kharkiv KhAI-5

== See also ==
- National Aerospace University – Kharkiv Aviation Institute
