= Aughinish =

Aughinish or Aughnish may refer to several places in Ireland:

- Aughinish, County Clare, an island in Galway Bay
- Aughinish, County Limerick, an industrial peninsula in the Shannon Estuary
- Aughnish, County Donegal, a parish in County Donegal
- Aughinish Alumina, an alumina refinery
