= Kalinin K-4 =

K-4
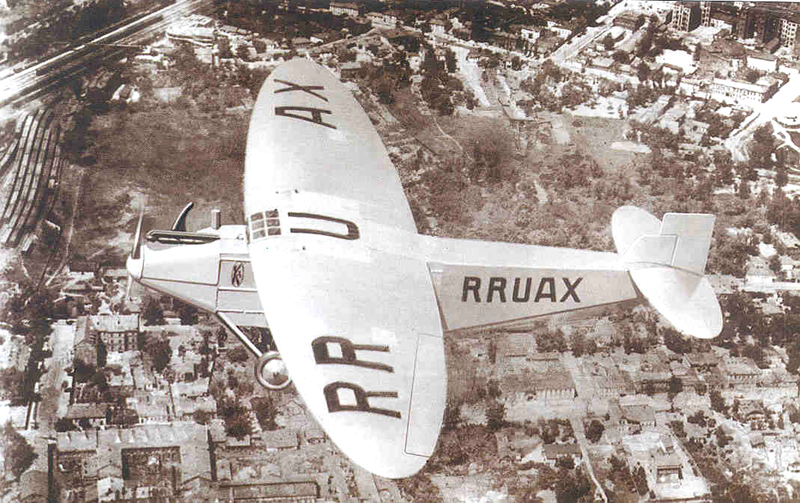

General information
- Type: Airliner
- National origin: Soviet Union
- Manufacturer: Kharkov Aviation Factory
- Designer: Konstantin Alekseevich Kalinin
- Primary user: Ukrvozdukhput
- Number built: 39

History
- Introduction date: 1929
- First flight: June 1928

The Kalinin K-4 was an airliner built in the Soviet Union in the late 1920s which was also adapted for use as a photographic survey aircraft and as an air ambulance. A further development of the K-1, it was a conventional high-wing, strut-braced monoplane with separate enclosed cabin and cockpit. Kalinin undertook the design to offer a locally produced alternative to pioneering Ukrainian airline Ukrvozdukhput, which was at that time flying Dornier designs. The structure was of mixed wood and metal construction, but with major assemblies designed in both wood and metal versions, allowing them to be interchanged. The design also featured a variable-incidence horizontal stabiliser, and the engine mounting was intended to facilitate the ready interchange of different powerplants.

== Development ==
By May 1928, four pre-production machines were being constructed at the Kharkiv Aviation Factory. While this work was proceeding, Dobrolyot placed an order with Ukrvozduhput for two photographic survey aircraft, a request that the latter undertook to fill with two specially equipped K-4s. These machines took priority at the factory, and differed from the passenger version in having a ventral hatch for one or two cameras mounted on the cabin floor, plus a self-contained darkroom. The air ambulance version was developed initially for exhibit at the 1928 Berlin Air Show, and examples would later see military service with Soviet forces in Finland during the Winter War.

In summer the same year, Soviet pilots evaluated the K-4 against a Dornier Merkur that was making a promotional tour. Encouraged by the positive feedback for his design, Kalinin obtained approval for a demanding flight between Kharkiv, Baku, Tbilisi, and back. Piloted by Mikhail Artemevich Snegirev, a K-4 named Червона Украина (Chervona Ukraina - "Red Ukraine") made the trip between 22 and 24 August. This same pilot and aircraft would set a new aerial distance record almost exactly a year later, flying from Kharkiv to Moscow to Irkutsk, then back to Moscow and Kharkiv. Although the original intention had been to reach Vladivostok, Snegirev still covered 10,400 km (6,500 mi) in 73 hours.

== Operational history ==
Flight testing was concluded in July 1928, and the four pre-production machines were handed over to Ukrvozduhput. They were put into service on routes linking the Crimea and Caucasus, and another ten aircraft were ordered. The following year, services were expanded to Tehran in a joint service arrangement with Junkers Luftverkehr. On 1 May 1929, seven Ukrvozduhput K-4s flew in formation from Kharkiv to Rostov, Sochi, Mineralnye Vody and Tbilisi. Service with the airline was short, however, as the K-4 demonstrated a poor safety record. Between 23 May and 24 August, K-4s were involved in fourteen accidents, including two in which passengers were killed. The first of these fatal accidents took place on 25 June, when K-4 (registered СССР-219) crashed after take-off from Sukhumi due to engine failure, killing two passengers. The second took place on 24 August when K-4 registered СССР-217 dove suddenly into the sea shortly after takeoff from Sochi. The wooden wings of the aircraft enabled it to float long enough for rescuers to reach it, however it sank soon afterwards, taking one passenger and one of the rescuers with it. The rescuer who drowned was celebrated Latvian military commander Jānis Fabriciuss, who had been Commander and a commissar of the Red Army during the Russian Civil War. Although the subsequent investigation attributed the crash to pilot error, numerous manufacturing defects were discovered throughout the K-4 fleet, leading to their withdrawal from service shortly thereafter.

Dobrolyot's survey machines commenced operations in August 1928, and were soon joined by around a dozen examples of the airliner version, which were used on routes in Kazakhstan and Central Asia. The K-4 proved unsuitable for these conditions, with the hot conditions causing the aircraft's wooden structures (especially the wings) to deform. The cost of maintenance and repairs soon became prohibitive, and by spring 1930, the aircraft were withdrawn. The type was evaluated for service on routes in the north, and one was used for the first passenger flight from Moscow to Tashkent, but nothing came of this. Eventually, the remaining aircraft were used for survey work in Siberia and the Urals.

== Operators ==
Soviet Union

- Ukrvozdukhput
- Dobrolyot
- Soviet Air Force

== Specifications (airliner version) ==
Data from Jane's all the World's Aircraft 1928

General characteristics

- Crew: 2
- Capacity: four passengers / 1,000 kg (2,200 lb) max payload / 2 bed patients, 1 attendant and one Doctor
- Length: 11.35 m (37 ft 3 in)
- Wingspan: 16.72 m (54 ft 10 in)
- Height: 3.8 m (12 ft 6 in)
- Wing area: 40 m^{2} (430 sq ft)
- Empty weight: 1,400 kg (3,086 lb)
- Gross weight: 2,360 kg (5,203 lb)
- Max takeoff weight: 2,400 kg (5,291 lb)
- Fuel capacity: 550 L (150 US gal; 120 imp gal)
- Powerplant: 1 × M-6 V-8 water-cooled piston engine, 220 kW (290 hp)
- Propellers: 2-bladed wooden fixed pitch propeller

Performance

- Maximum speed: 185 km/h (115 mph, 100 kn)
- Cruise speed: 160 km/h (99 mph, 86 kn)
- Landing speed: 75 km/h (40 kn; 47 mph)
- Range: 1,040 km (650 mi, 560 nmi)
- Service ceiling: 6,250 m (20,510 ft)
- Rate of climb: 2.4 m/s (470 ft/min)
- Time to altitude: 1,000 m (3,300 ft) in 8.5 minutes; 3,000 m (9,800 ft) in 45 minutes
- Time to altitude with 640 kg (1,410 lb) load: 1,000 m (3,300 ft) in 5 minutes 35 seconds, 3,000 m (9,800 ft) in 20.5 minutes, 51,000 m (167,000 ft) in 47 minutes 18 seconds
- Wing loading: 59 kg/m^{2} (12 lb/sq ft)
- Power/mass: 0.092 kW/kg (0.056 hp/lb)
