= K15 =

K15 or K-15 may refer to:

- Kukiz'15 (short: K'15), a polish right-wing political party
- K-15 (Kansas highway)
- K-15 (television series), a Macedonian comedy program
- K15, South Korean light machine gun
- K-15 Sagarika, an Indian submarine-launched ballistic missile
- HMS K15, a submarine of the Royal Navy
- HMS Heartsease (K15), a corvette of the Royal Navy
- Kalinin K-15, a planned Soviet rocket fighter aircraft
- Keratin 15
- Sonata in B flat, K. 15, by Wolfgang Amadeus Mozart
