= Kalinin K-6 =

K-6

General information
- Type: Mail-plane / fast print matrix transport
- National origin: USSR
- Manufacturer: GROS
- Designer: Konstantin Alekseyevich Kalinin
- Number built: 1

History
- First flight: August 1930
- Developed from: Kalinin K-5

The Kalinin K-6 was a mail-plane designed by Konstantin Alekseevič Kalinin. It was an aircraft largely derived from the previous Kalinin K-5, which shared its wing, tail and landing gear. This aircraft differed from the previous one by the new fuselage design, which was slender and had a four-meter compartment for the load (370 kg). The K-6 flew for the first time in 1930 but remained at the prototype stage, since mass production was never authorised.

== Specifications (K-6) ==
Data from The Osprey Encyclopedia of Russian Aircraft 1875–1995

General characteristics

- Crew: 2
- Length: 15 m (49 ft 3 in)
- Wingspan: 20 m (65 ft 7 in)
- Wing area: 64 m^{2} (690 sq ft)
- Empty weight: 1,720 kg (3,792 lb)
- Gross weight: 2,820 kg (6,217 lb)
- Fuel capacity: 550 kg (1,210 lb) fuel; 50 kg (110 lb) oil
- Powerplant: 1 × Gnome et Rhône 9A Jupiter 9-cylinder air-cooled radial piston engine, 310 kW (420 hp)
- Propellers: 2-bladed fixed pitch propeller

Performance

- Maximum speed: 210 km/h (130 mph, 110 kn)
- Cruise speed: 170 km/h (110 mph, 92 kn)
- Landing speed: 75 km/h (47 mph; 40 kn)
- Range: 1,250 km (780 mi, 670 nmi)
- Service ceiling: 5,600 m (18,400 ft)
- Time to altitude: 1,000 m (3,300 ft) in 5 minutes
