= Kalinin K-13 =

Proposed bomber aircraft by Kalinin

The Kalinin K-13 was a bombing aircraft designed by Konstantin Kalinin in 1933. The aircraft was developed in response to a set of requirements issued by the Soviet VVS for a bomber, but never actually entered production.

== Development ==
The Kalinin-led OKB began work on the K-13 beginning in 1933, in response to a specification issued by the Soviet Air Force for a new bomber aircraft. In detail, the required features provided for a long-range aircraft, capable of carrying one ton of bombs at a distance of 5000 km, flying at 4000 meters altitude at a speed of at least 350 km/h. In 1934, a passenger variant was also presented, the Kalinin K-14, which was unsuccessfully submitted to those responsible for civil air transport. A mock-up of the K-13 was built in Voronezh in 1936, but the aircraft was judged inferior to the designs submitted by Tupolev and Ilyushin, the other two companies that had responded to the specifications issued.

== Design ==
The K-13 used various technical solutions developed for the Kalinin K-12. This aircraft was supposed to be a metal monoplane, powered by two liquid-cooled M-34 engines placed in the wings. The expected payload was one ton of bombs, while for defense three machine guns were carried, two in the front and a turret in the tail. There were three crew: a pilot, front gunner/bomb aimer, and rear gunner. The passenger variant should have been able to carry twelve passengers in addition to two crew members. The average speed of the aircraft was expected to be approximately 429 km/h.
