= Kalinin K-2 =

Soviet airliner

K-2

General information
- Type: Airliner
- National origin: Soviet Union
- Manufacturer: OKB Kalinin / GROSS (Grazhdanskoye Optnoye Samolyetstroenie - civil experimental aeroplane works)
- Status: Retired
- Number built: 5

History
- First flight: 20 April 1925
- Developed from: Kalinin K-1
- Variant: Kalinin K-3

The Kalinin K-2 (Russian Калинин К-2) was a Soviet airliner designed and built by the designer Konstantin Kalinin. The aircraft was a variant of the predecessor K-1 with a stronger engine and an all-metal construction. The total weight of the construction exceeded that of the planning considerably. The first flight took place in 1926. The assembly was more complex than the K-1, but only four were built.

== Development ==
Kalinin was assigned to the yard of the airline Ukrvozdukhput after the registration of the K-1 design in Kharkiv as a construction site. The yard was then renamed GROS (Graschdanskoje Opytnoje Samoleostrojenie, pilot aircraft construction for civil aviation). Shortly thereafter, it was referred to only as a "series work". Here Kalinin gathered his best employees around and planned the further development of the K-1. The planning group included I. G. Neman, S. I. Iskovich, A. J. Shcherbakov, and W. J. Krilow.

== Construction ==
The fuselage consisted of a welded tubular steel framework and was clad with light-alloy sheet metal from Koltschug aluminum. The construction was designed as a high wing monoplane whose wings were braced to the lower part of the trunk body. The wings had an elliptical shape and were, like the tail, made of tubular steel and also covered with light metal sheets. The tail had a normal shape (tail fins strutted to the fuselage). All control surfaces were covered with fabric. The chassis was fixed and provided with a continuous axle. At the rear of the fuselage was a sprung tailspur. The pilot sat in a closed cabin.

== Variants ==
K-2
refined K-1 first flown in 1926, used by Ukrvozdukhput
K-3
Ambulance variant of the K-2 with accommodation for one doctor with 2 stretcher patients or four seated patients.

== Specifications ==
Data from The Osprey Encyclopedia of Russian Aircraft 1875–1995

General characteristics

- Crew: 1
- Capacity: 4 pax / 636 kg (1,402 lb) payload
- Length: 11.17 m (36 ft 8 in)
- Wingspan: 16.7 m (54 ft 9 in)
- Wing area: 40 m^{2} (430 sq ft)
- Empty weight: 1,600 kg (3,527 lb)
- Gross weight: 2,236 kg (4,930 lb)
- Powerplant: 1 × BMW IV 6-cylinder water-cooled in-line pistonengine, 180 kW (240 hp)
- Propellers: 2-bladed wooden fixed pitch propeller

Performance

- Maximum speed: 170 km/h (110 mph, 92 kn)
- Cruise speed: 140 km/h (87 mph, 76 kn)
- Range: 650 km (400 mi, 350 nmi)
- Service ceiling: 3,500 m (11,500 ft)
- Time to altitude: 1,000 m (3,300 ft) in 12 minutes
- Take-off distance: 220 m (720 ft)
- Landing distance: 200 m (660 ft) at 75 km/h (47 mph; 40 kn)
