= Kubal =

Kubal or KUBAL may refer to:

- Kubikenborg Aluminium, an alumina refinery in Sweden
- Willughbeia sarawacensis, a plant with edible fruit native to Palawan and Borneo
