= Kalinin K-10 =

Soviet utility aircraft prototype

K-10

General information
- Type: Trainer
- National origin: USSR
- Manufacturer: OKB Kalinin
- Number built: 1

History
- First flight: September 1932

The Kalinin K-10 was a monoplane designed by Konstantin Alekseevič Kalinin to perform liaison, training and agricultural tasks. From the technical point of view, it was characterized by the presence of tandem controls, fixed carriage, and folding wings, in order to make storage easier.

The K-10 flew for the first time in 1932, however, it never entered mass production.

== Specifications (K-10) ==
Data from The Osprey Encyclopedia of Russian Aircraft 1875–1995

General characteristics

- Crew: 2
- Length: 7.03 m (23 ft 1 in)
- Wingspan: 10.7 m (35 ft 1 in)
- Wing area: 18 m^{2} (190 sq ft)
- Empty weight: 700 kg (1,543 lb)
- Gross weight: 1,035 kg (2,282 lb)
- Powerplant: 1 × Shvetsov M-11 5-cylinder air-cooled radial piston engine
- Propellers: 2-bladed fixed pitch wooden propeller

Performance

- Maximum speed: 175 km/h (109 mph, 94 kn)
- Cruise speed: 145 km/h (90 mph, 78 kn)
- Range: 480 km (300 mi, 260 nmi)
- Service ceiling: 3,800 m (12,500 ft)
- Time to altitude: 1,000 m (3,300 ft) in 7 minutes
- Landing speed: 85 km/h (53 mph; 46 kn)
