= Kalinin K-5 =

K-5
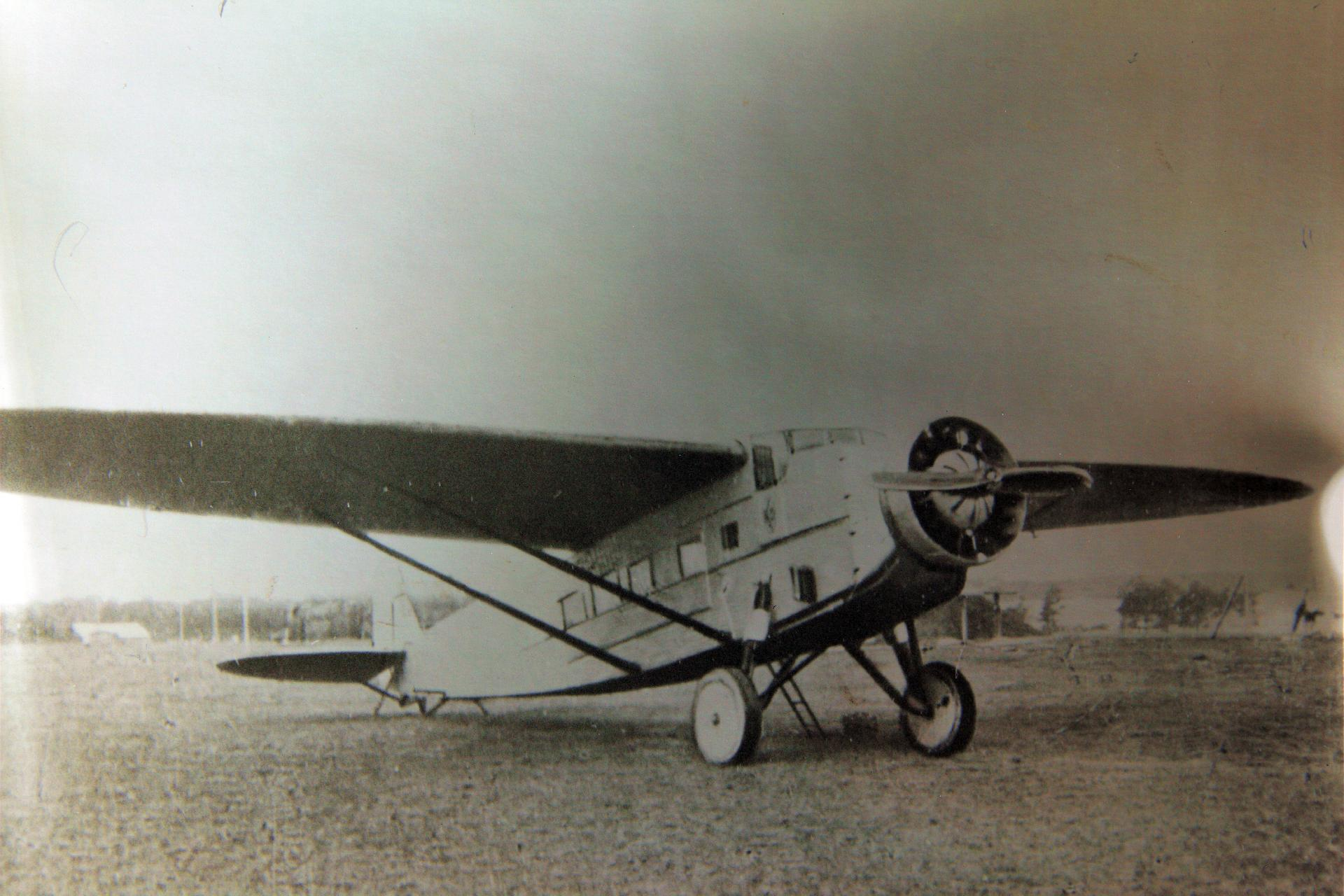

General information
- Type: Airliner
- National origin: Soviet Union
- Manufacturer: Kharkov Aviation Factory
- Designer: Konstantin Alekseevich Kalinin
- Primary user: Aeroflot
- Number built: 260

History
- First flight: 18 October 1929

The Kalinin K-5 was an airliner produced in the Soviet Union in the 1930s, built in larger quantities than any other Soviet airliner of its time, with some 260 aircraft constructed. It was a conventional, high-wing, strut-braced monoplane with a fully enclosed cabin and cockpit, and followed the general pattern developed by Kalinin in his earlier designs, though on a larger scale.

== Development ==
Kalinin had first considered an airliner for 10-12 passengers as early as 1926, but it was not until Ukrvozdukhput expressed interest in such a machine late the following year that work on the design began in earnest. The prototype was ready by mid-autumn 1929, and first flew on October 18 with Mikhail Artemevich Snegirev at the controls. Safety trials for the State Commission commenced on 30 May 1930, and were passed successfully.

Ongoing problems with the aircraft's Gnome et Rhône-built Bristol Jupiter engine resulted in the second prototype being powered by a Pratt & Whitney Hornet instead. This machine undertook further testing and a number of promotional flights before series production of the K-5 commenced. Early production examples were used on trial services between Kharkiv and Moscow, Mineralnye Vody, and Baku. Problems with the Bessonov M-15 engines became quickly apparent, with frequent failures and operational lifespans measured in only dozens of hours. K-5 operations were suspended by the Inspectorate of Civil Aviation until the issues were resolved.

Kalinin turned to the Shvetsov M-22 as an alternative powerplant. While reliability increased, this engine installation also created more drag than the M-15 had, and performance decreased accordingly. State Acceptance trials carried out in May–June 1932 confirmed the reliability of the engine with 550 takeoffs and landings and 2,000 steep turns, but found that the payload capacity was now unacceptably low. By this time, however, the M-15 had become reliable enough for restrictions to be lifted and K-5 production resumed, and eventually about 100 K-5s were fitted with this engine. The reliability of the revised M-15 design was vindicated by a gruelling flight through the Caucasus on 25 June 1933.

Eventually, the Mikulin M-17F provided the definitive powerplant for the K-5, offering an increase in power and performance over the M-15, but decreasing the aircraft's payload and range due to its greater weight. The new engine also required strengthening of the wing design; the first K-5 fitted with this engine suffered structural damage during flight tests due to the increase in engine power.

== Operational history ==
The K-5 was widely used by Aeroflot, displacing German-built Junkers F 13s and Dornier Komets in regular service. The first scheduled route flown by K-5s was Moscow-Kharkov, followed by services between Moscow and Sverdlovsk, Tashkent, and Arkhangelsk. They remained in service until 1940, becoming the backbone of Aeroflot's domestic operations.

The K-5 was also used by the Soviet Air Force as a transport aircraft, operating in this capacity until 1943.

== Operators ==
Mongolia

- Mongolian People's Army Aviation

Soviet Union

- Aeroflot
- Soviet Air Force

== Specifications ==
General characteristics

- Crew: 2 pilots
- Capacity: 8 passengers or 690 kg (1,520 lb) cargo
- Length: 15.87 m (52 ft 1 in)
- Wingspan: 20.50 m (67 ft 3 in)
- Height: 2.89 m (9 ft 6 in)
- Wing area: 66.0 m^{2} (710 sq ft)
- Empty weight: 2,710 kg (5,975 lb)
- Gross weight: 4,000 kg (8,820 lb)
- Powerplant: 1 × Mikulin M-17F , 540 kW (730 hp)

Performance

- Maximum speed: 206 km/h (128 mph, 111 kn)
- Range: 1,020 km (635 mi, 552 nmi)
- Service ceiling: 5,560 m (18,240 ft)
- Rate of climb: 1.0 m/s (200 ft/min)

== See also ==
Aircraft of comparable role, configuration, and era

- Focke-Wulf A 17
- Fokker F.XIV
- Stout 2-AT Pullman
