= Aughinish, County Limerick =

Industrial peninsula in the Shannon Estuary, Ireland

Coordinates: 52°37′19.46″N 9°3′54.11″W

Aughinish
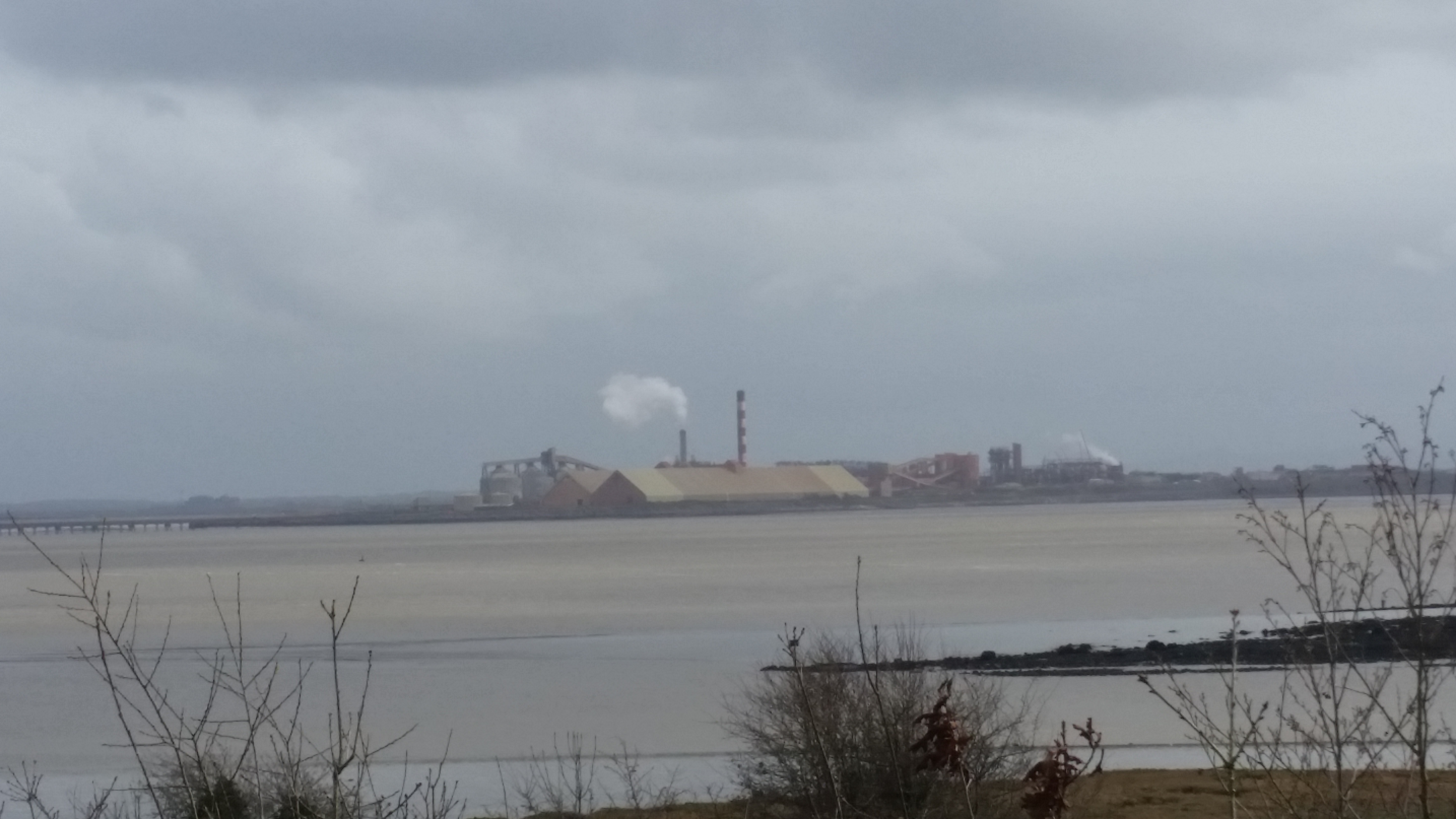
- As seen from Kildysart.
- Interactive map of Aughinish

Administration
- Ireland

Aughinish is a former island (now peninsula) in the Shannon estuary, in County Limerick, Ireland, near Foynes.

Although most of the island is occupied by industry, it is also the site of Ireland's first butterfly sanctuary, located in an abandoned quarry.

== Industry ==
Aughinish Alumina, Europe's largest bauxite refinery, is located on the island. Completed in October 1971, the plant is owned by Rusal. The site has a deep-water jetty in the Shannon through which the refinery imports bauxite from Guinea and Brazil and exports alumina to be refined into aluminium metal.

Adjacent to the refinery is a 450-acre disposal area for bauxite residue, also called "red mud". While the High Court quashed planning permission awarded to expand the bauxite waste dump in 2022, and despite continued objections from local farmers and environment groups, a revised application to expand the disposal area was approved in 2025.

In March 2026, an investigation carried out by the Organized Crime and Corruption Reporting Project (OCCRP) and its partners found that the refinery indirectly supplies materials to sanctioned Russian arms manufacturers.
