= Braidy Industries =

Kentucky-based aluminum alloys manufacturer

Braidy Industries, Inc.
- Type: Private
- Industry: Aluminum manufacturing
- Founder: Craig T. Bouchard
- Headquarters: Ashland, Kentucky, United States
- Area served: United States
- Key people: Donald L. Foster (Acting President and Chief Executive Officer); Brigadier General (ret) Blaine D. Holt (Chief Operating Officer)
- Products: Aluminum alloys
- Website: braidyindustries.com

Braidy Industries is an Ashland, Kentucky-based company, planning to become an aluminum alloys manufacturer providing aluminum for the automotive and the food and beverage industries. In October 2020 Braidy Industries announced that it was changing its name to Unity Aluminum.

== Subsidiaries ==
Braidy Industries, Inc. owned Braidy Atlas, a start-up that designed and engineered the first aluminum rolling mill in the United States in nearly 40 years. It also held Veloxint, an MIT incubated technology company, and NanoAL, a Northwestern University incubated technology company.

The assets of Braidy Industries were sold to Steel Dynamics in 2022, which announced the mill will be built in Mississippi.

== History ==
Braidy Industries was founded by Craig T. Bouchard who wanted to create eco-friendly aluminum alloys, and named after one of his daughters. The industry demand was bending towards stronger and lighter materials and the company was founded to accommodate the market gap created by this generational shift.

Braidy Industries started off with an initial project of a fully integrated aluminum rolling mill in the Greenup County, Kentucky, comprising a 2.5 million square-foot area. The site, relocated to neighboring Boyd County, Kentucky is located in Eastern Kentucky and the facility costs were estimated to be around $1.6 billion.

The site for the mill is located near the Ohio River and the CSX railroad, as well as I-64, which connects the site to various automotive plants within 300 miles around the region. This advantage allows the site to utilize the just-in-time approach.

The company is working with the Ashland Alliance and the Kentucky Economic Development Finance Authority (KEDFA) as a part of the Kentucky Business Investment program based on which they received up to $10 million in tax incentives.

=== Joint venture with RUSAL ===
In April 2019 Braidy announced a joint project with RUSAL, a Russian aluminum company partially owned by the oligarch Oleg Deripaska. The project is to develop the mill site in Ashland, Kentucky "to produce flat-rolled aluminum products for the U.S. automotive industry," according to a company press release.

=== Founder ===
Bouchard litigated to remove the directors in January 2020. A third-party firm was hired by the directors involved in the Delaware litigation to conduct a review. Bouchard litigated the claims in the Delaware Chancery Court, and the claims were then dropped. Foster stepped in as acting president and CEO. The company announced it had amicably settled the lawsuit and repurchased Bouchard's shares for $6 million.

=== 2020 pandemic ===
During the 2020 COVID-19 pandemic, the company received between $1 million and $2 million in federally backed small business loans from Community Trust Bank as part of the Paycheck Protection Program. They stated it would help them retain 65 employees.
