= Severouralsk =

Town in Sverdlovsk Oblast, Russia

Severouralsk Североуральск
- Town
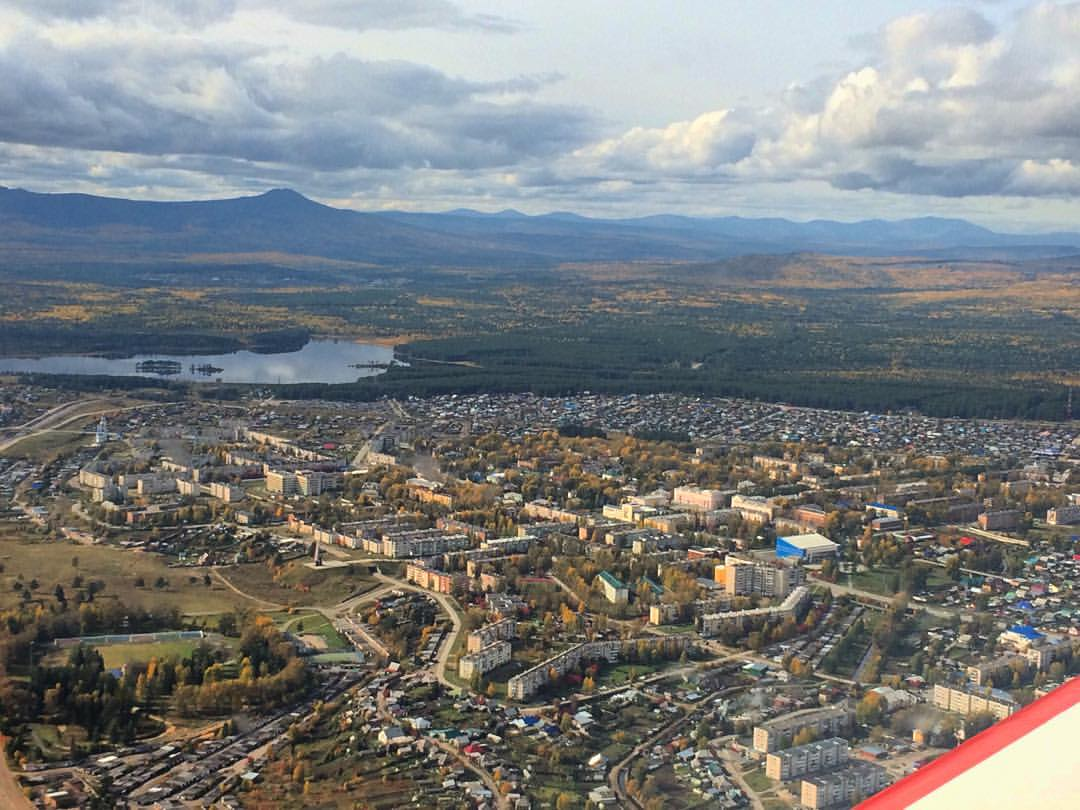
- Aerial view of Severouralsk

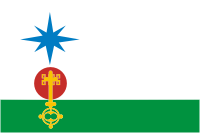
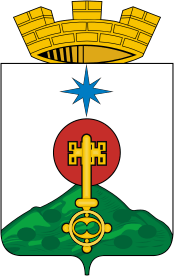
- Flag Coat of arms
- Interactive map of Severouralsk
- Location of Severouralsk Severouralsk (Sverdlovsk Oblast)
- Coordinates: 60°09′N 59°58′E
- Country: Russia
- Federal subject: Sverdlovsk Oblast
- Founded: 1758
- Town status since: 1944
- Elevation: 200 m (660 ft)

Population (2010 Census)
  - Total: 29,263
  - Estimate (2025): 23,705 (−19%)

Administrative status
  - Subordinated to: Town of Severouralsk
  - Capital of: Town of Severouralsk

Municipal status
  - Urban okrug: Severouralsky Urban Okrug
  - Capital of: Severouralsky Urban Okrug
- Time zone: UTC+5 (MSK+2)
- Postal codes: 624480–624482, 624485, 624486, 624489
- Dialing code: +7 34380
- OKTMO ID: 65755000001
- Website: adm-severouralsk.ru

Severouralsk population
- 2010 Census: 29,263
- 2002 Census: 34,673
- 1989 Census: 36,131
- 1979 Census: 32,536

Severouralsk (Russian: Североура́льск, lit. (a town) in the Northern Urals) is a town in Sverdlovsk Oblast, Russia, located on the Vagran River (Ob's basin) at its confluence with the Kolonga River, 512 kilometers (318 mi) north of Yekaterinburg, the administrative center of the oblast. As of the 2010 Census, its population was 29,263.

== History ==
It was founded in 1758 due to the construction of a cast iron and copper-smelting factory. In 1931, the Soviets discovered a large deposit of bauxites in the area, followed by discovery of other deposits. Severouralsk was granted town status in 1944 after a number of surrounding settlements had been integrated into it.

== Administrative and municipal status ==
Within the framework of the administrative divisions, it is, together with eight rural localities, incorporated as the Town of Severouralsk—an administrative unit with the status equal to that of the districts. As a municipal division, the Town of Severouralsk is incorporated as Severouralsky Urban Okrug.

== Transportation ==
The town is served by the Severouralsk Airport.

== See also ==
- Sevuralboksitruda
