= Zakavia =

Airline in Georgia (1923–1929)

Zakavia (Transcaucasian Society of Air Transport, Russian: Закавиа, Закавказское общество воздушных сообщений) was an airline in Georgia and later in Azerbaijan, formed in 1923 and ceased in 1929. Zakavia, created in Georgia on May 10, 1923, was a joint-stock company organized according to the Dobrolyot model. It was one of the three companies organized according to this model in 1923, together with Dobrolyot and Ukrpovitroshliach. Every person or organization could buy Zakavia stocks, and those who owned stocks above a threshold amount could use an airplane built for their money in any way they need unless the airplane was needed for military purposes.

In 1925, civil aviation of Georgia and Azerbaijan were merged into the united Zakavia society. In 1926, it started to fly between Mineralnye Vody and Tbilisi via Grozny, Makhachkala, Baku, and Yevlakh.

In 1929, Zakavia, together with similar organizations in the Soviet republics, was merged into Dobrolyot USSR, a predecessor of Aeroflot.
