= Aluminium: The Thirteenth Element =

Russian encyclopedia

Aluminium. Thirteenth Element. Encyclopedia
- The front cover of the English edition
- Editor: Elena Shanina
- Author: Andrey Drozdov
- Original title: Алюминий. Тринадцатый элемент. Энциклопедия
- Translator: Brian Droitcour; Daniil Dynin; Julia Melnikova; Anton Nesterov; Ekaterina Pruss; David Riff; Boris Shubick
- Illustrator: Arseny Meshcheryakov (Art Director)
- Language: English, Russian
- Subject: Aluminium
- Genre: Reference book
- Publisher: The RUSAL Library
- Publication date: 2007
- Publication place: Russia
- English publication date: 2007
- Media type: Print
- Pages: 232 p. (English); 240 с. (Russian)
- ISBN: 978-5-91523-002-5 (Russian: ISBN 978-5-91523-001-8)
- Dewey Decimal: 503
- LC Class: QD
- Original text: Алюминий. Тринадцатый элемент. Энциклопедия at RUSAL
- Translation: Aluminium. Thirteenth Element. Encyclopedia at RUSAL

Aluminium: The Thirteenth Element (Russian: Алюминий. Тринадцатый элемент) is a Russian encyclopedia completely devoted to aluminium. The encyclopedia is published by United Company RUSAL, at the end of 2007, in both Russian and English. Four thousand copies were printed (240 pages).

The encyclopedia covers various areas of aluminium application, starting from car engineering and architecture to jewellery and fashion, recounts how this metal was discovered, and describes technologies of its production, its properties and benefits for various spheres of life.

The book consists of 9 chapters, with an index/glossary and name index enclosed at the end. The encyclopedia contains diversified illustrative materials stemming from Russia and from overseas photo archives, museums and private collections.

== Contents ==
- Chapter 1. The History of Aluminium Before the 19th Century. Historical background of aluminium in ancient times; archeological findings containing aluminium; first historic mentions of aluminium articles; information about 'alum' – compound substances with chemical structures containing aluminium; production technologies alum and areas of their application in the Ancient Times and Middle Ages.
- Chapter 2. How the Metal Was Discovered. Scientists and technologies associated with the first attempts to produce pure aluminium; the beginning of the industrial production of the metal and birth of aluminium manufacturing in different countries of the world; use of cryolite; deployment of aluminium in the 19th century; first machine-made aluminium products.
- Chapter 3. A Precious Metal Becomes Industrial. Versatile methods of metals production starting from the 19th century, pioneering scientists (with examples, cuttings and illustrations from their patents) in this sphere and the role of electric current in reduction and decomposition of metals; aluminium applications in the late XIX — early 20th century, use of aluminium alloys in different spheres of life back in those times.
- Chapter 4. Aluminium Production in Russia and the USSR: the Late 19th and Early 20th Centuries. Development of aluminium smelting technologies in Russia, first domestically produced metal and its applications in the Soviet times.
- Chapter 5. The Modern aluminium smelter. Contemporary aluminium production sites in different countries: used raw materials, cutting-edge methods, technologies and stages in production of aluminium; world's aluminium consumption structure and output; aluminium production process profile as exemplified by operation of modern potrooms at aluminium smelters, recycling and secondary use of aluminium in the world.
- Chapter 6. A Metal Resembling Tin in Color and Luster. Basic data on the structure of aluminium atoms; different compounds containing aluminium; chemical and physical properties; different reactions involving aluminium.
- Chapter 7. The Earth and Beyond (Aluminium Minerals). Most important aluminium minerals (oxide, sulfate, hydroxide, aluminosilicates, etc.); extraction, manufacture and use of precious stones made of aluminium minerals (like ruby, sapphire, etc.).
- Chapter 8. Aluminium around us. Various aluminium applications from packaging and kitchenware through to use in various industries (like aviation, space technology, car manufacturing, electrical engineering, railway, chemical and fuel industries); deployment of the metal in construction; aluminium in the human body.
- Chapter 9. Aluminium and art. Use of aluminium in architecture, sculpture, furniture production, design, jewellery and fashion.
- On the Threshold of the Aluminium Age. Role of the metal in evolution and the future of aluminium in the 21st century.
