= Konstantin Kalinin =

World War I aviator and Soviet aircraft designer (1889–1938/1940)

Konstantin Alekseevich Kalinin
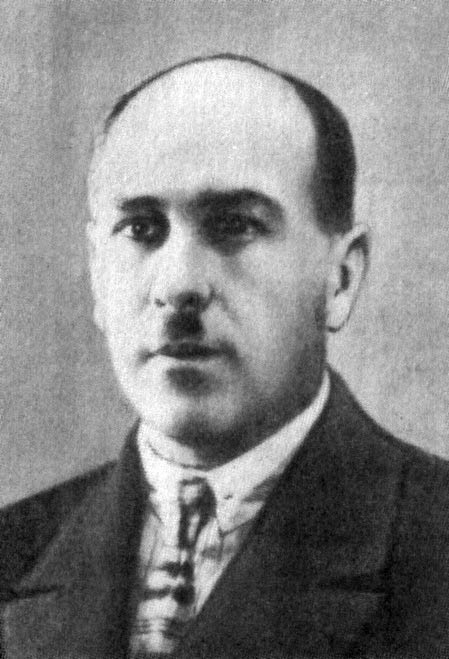
- Born: 24 January 1887; Warsaw
- Died: 24 October 1938 (aged 51) Voronezh
- Allegiance: Ukrainian State; Ukrainian People's Republic
- Branch: Ukrainian People's Republic Air Fleet
- Service years: 1917–1920
- Rank: Staff captain
- Known for: Aircraft industry
- Education: Igor Sikorsky Kyiv Polytechnic Institute (Ukraine)

Konstantin Alekseevich Kalinin (Russian: Калинин Константин Алексеевич, Ukrainian: Костянтин Олексійович Калінін, Polish: Konstantin Kalinin; born 17 December (29) 1889 in Warsaw, Russian Empire; died 1938 or 21 April 1940 in Voronezh) was a World War I aviator and Soviet aircraft designer.

He was born to a Russian family in Warsaw, Russian Empire. Kalinin graduated from the Odessa Military School in 1912, the Gatchina Military Aviation School in 1916 and the Kyiv Polytechnic Institute in 1925. After the Treaty of Brest-Litovsk, he became a pilot and commanding officer of Ukrainian People's Army under the Hetmanate and Ukrainian Directory Government, which later became one of the reason for his purge by Stalin's government. In this capacity he commanded the 1st Volhynian Aerial Division of Ukrainian People's Republic Air Fleet.

After the fall of Ukrainian People Republic he studied in Kyiv Polytechnic Institute. In 1926, he organized and headed an aviation design bureau in Ukrpovitroshliakh repair factory in Kharkiv. There, he designed the Kalinin K-4, Kalinin K-5, Kalinin K-7 and Kalinin K-12 aircraft. He was a member of the All-Union Communist Party (bolsheviks) since 1927.

Kalinin was arrested on 1 April 1938 in Voronezh during the Great Purge. While in prison, he designed the K-15 delta-wing rocket fighter. Seven months after his arrest on 22 October, at a closed court hearing of the Military Collegium of the Supreme Court of the Soviet Union, which lasted 10 minutes without defense or witnesses, Kalinin was accused of anti-Soviet activities and espionage and sentenced to death.

The same day (according to some sources the next day, 23 October), Kalinin was executed in the basement of the NKVD prison in Voronezh. According to Soviet records, he died in 1940.

Kalinin was rehabilitated posthumously on 10 August 1955.

Kalinin was one of the founders and first teachers of the Kharkiv Aviation Institute. He was awarded the Order of the Red Banner of Labour.

== Products ==
- K-1, three-passenger airliner (1924)
- K-2, four-passenger airliner developed from the K-1 (1925)
- K-3, air ambulance version of K-2 (1927)
- K-4, multipurpose transport (1928)
- K-5, eight-passenger airliner (1929). Was the backbone of Aeroflot's fleet in the 1930s.
- K-6, prototype mailplane derivative of the K-5 (1930). Only one built.
- K-7, experimental large seven-engine bomber/airliner (1933). Only one built.
- K-9, liaison/sport aircraft (1930). Only one built.
- K-10, trainer/liaison/agricultural aircraft (1932). Only one built.
- K-11, twin-engine, twin-boom transport project (1933)
- K-12/BS-2, prototype twin-engine tailless bomber (1936). Also known as Zhar-Ptitsa (Firebird).
- K-13, long-range, twin-engine bomber (1933). Cancelled as it was inferior to the Ilyushin DB-3.
- K-14, airliner version of the K-13 (1934)
- K-15, delta-wing rocket (or jet) bomber design (early 1930s)
- K-16, high-altitude reconnaissance aircraft
- K-17, four-engine, long-range tailless bomber
