= HAZ =

Haz or HAZ may refer to:

== People ==
- Haz Al-Din (born 1996), American political commentator and activist
- Hamzah Haz (1940-2024), Indonesian journalist and politician, ninth Vice President of Indonesia
- Mark Hazinski (born 1985), American table tennis player

== Other uses ==
- Haz, Yemen
- Hannoversche Allgemeine Zeitung, a German newspaper
- Hazaragi dialect of Persian spoken in Afghanistan
- Hazardous material
- Hazel Grove railway station, in England
- Hazlehurst station, in Mississippi, United States
- Heat-affected zone in welding
