= Sevuralboksitruda =

This is a Bauxite mining company in Severouralsk Oblast whose parent company is RUSAL

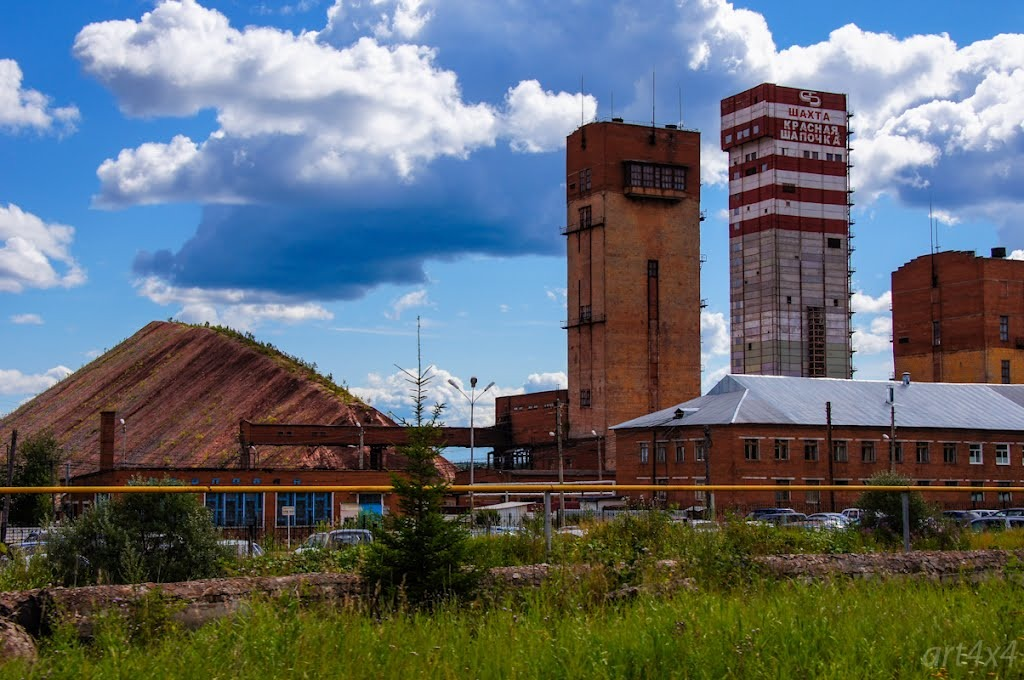
Krasnaya Shapochka Bauxite Mine, 2016

The Sevuralboksitruda (SUBR) (split up as 'Sev. Ural Boksit Ruda', meaning 'North Urals Bauxite Ore Deposit') is a Russian bauxite-mining concern operated by RUSAL. It is based in the town of Severouralsk in Sverdlovsk Oblast, and works bauxite deposits in Cheryomukhovsky, Kalyinsky and Novokalyinsky, including the "Krasnaya shapochka" ('little red riding hood') deposit which was discovered in 1934.

It extracted more than 3.8 million tons of bauxite in 2000, which were processed at the Bogoslovsky and Urals aluminium plants.

== See also ==
- Environmental issues in Russia
