= Severouralsk Airport =

- IATA: none; ICAO: USSE

Summary
- Airport type: Public
- Location: Severouralsk
- Elevation AMSL: 604 ft / 184 m
- Coordinates: 60°18′6″N 60°4′30″E
- Interactive map of Severouralsk Airport

Runways
Direction	Length		Surface
Direction	ft	m	Surface
03/21	4,718	1,438	Concrete

Severouralsk Airport (Russian: Аэропорт Североуральск) (ICAO: USSE) is an airport in Russia located 6 km southeast of Severouralsk. It handles small transport and passenger aircraft (An-24, Tu-134, Yak-40).

The airport has been disused since the early 1990s, but its infrastructure is in satisfactory condition.

== See also ==
- List of airports in Russia
