= Kalinin K-9 =

K-9
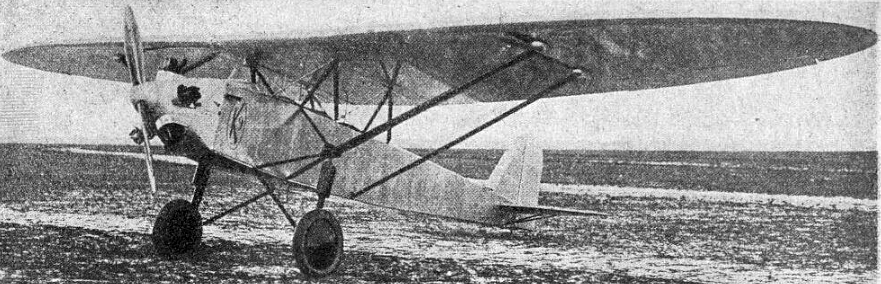

General information
- Type: Liaison / sport aircraft
- National origin: USSR
- Manufacturer: GROSS
- Designer: Konstantin Alekseyevich Kalinin
- Number built: 1

History
- First flight: 1932

The Kalinin K-9 was a liaison/sport aircraft designed by Konstantin Alekseevič Kalinin. It had a parasol wing, only one was built in 1932. The prototype was evaluated during some test flights, but development was never carried out. The tests revealed that the K-9 was too large and too heavy in relation to the installed engine, (60 hp (45 kW) Walter NZ 60, 17.165 kg/kW (28.219 lb/hp)).

== Specifications (K-9) ==
Data from The Osprey Encyclopedia of Russian Aircraft 1875–1995

General characteristics

- Crew: 2
- Length: 7.1 m (23 ft 4 in)
- Wingspan: 9.8 m (32 ft 2 in)
- Wing area: 18.1 m^{2} (195 sq ft)
- Empty weight: 550 kg (1,213 lb)
- Gross weight: 770 kg (1,698 lb)
- Fuel capacity: 60 kg (130 lb) fuel and oil
- Powerplant: 1 × Walter NZ 60 5-cylinder air-cooled radial piston engine, 45 kW (60 hp)

Performance

- Maximum speed: 120 km/h (75 mph, 65 kn)
- Landing speed: 60 km/h (37 mph; 32 kn)
- Endurance: 3 hours
- Power/mass: 17.165 kg/kW (28.219 lb/hp)
