= Kubikenborg Aluminium =

Aluminium metal producer and recycler in Sweden

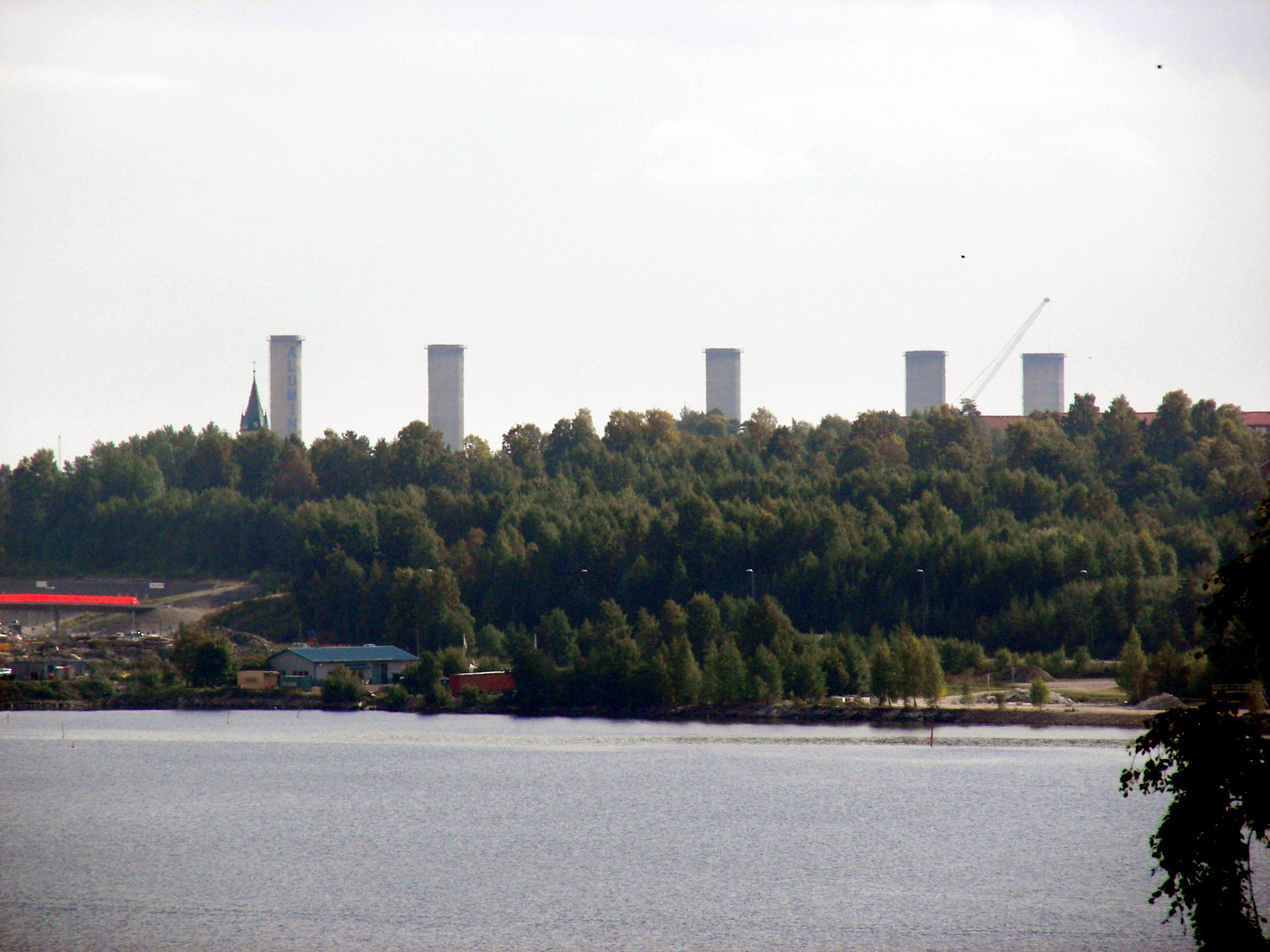
- A view of the factory in 2013
- Built: 1942
- Location: Sundsvall, Västernorrland County, Sweden
- Coordinates: 62.3765445°N 17.3639482°E
- Industry: Melting plant
- Products: Aluminium
- Employees: 450
- Owner: Rusal
- Website: rusal.ru

Kubikenborg Aluminium AB (KUBAL) is an aluminium metal melting and recycling factory situated in Sundsvall, Västernorrland County in Sweden. It is Sweden's only producer of primary aluminium, producing around 100,000–134,000 tons annually. Being the largest employer in Sundsvall and Västernorrland it employs around 450–470 employees.

The factory is owned by Rusal, a Russian aluminium company headquartered in Moscow.

== History ==
The melting plant was built in 1942 by the Swedish Aluminium Company (SAKO), a subsidiary of Svenska Metallverken. From 1969 to 2007 it was owned by Gränges AB before it was sold to Rusal.

== Controversies ==
The refinery is associated with severe environmental problems affecting the local area. Various strikes have been held in the city against the refinery due to its excessive smoke emissions.

Founder of Rusal and partial owner Oleg Deripaska has been sanctioned by various countries due to their ties to the Russian government and supplying materials used by the Russian military. In 2018 the KUBAL was threatened with sanctions and Deripaska was forced to reduce its ownership of the refinery. Since 2024 the Swedish Centre Party has called for the nationalization of the refinery.

On March 26, 2026, two KUBAL executives were arrested over breaching sanctions.

== See also ==
- Aughinish Alumina
- International sanctions during the Russo-Ukrainian war
- Russian shadow fleet
