= Kharkiv KhAZ-30 =

ViS-3 KhAZ-30
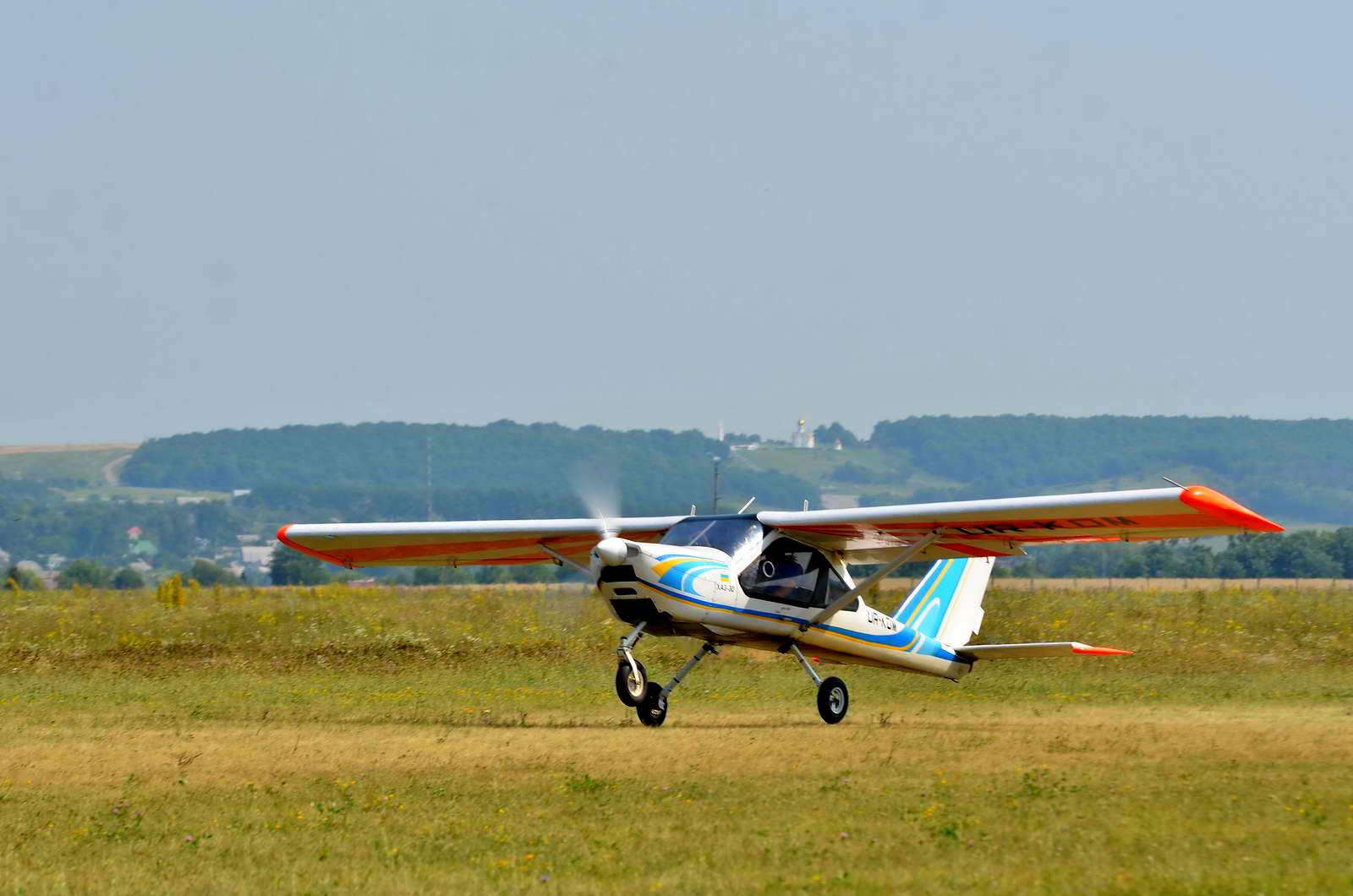

General information
- Type: Two-seat ultralight
- National origin: Ukraine
- Manufacturer: Kharkiv State Aviation Plant
- Designer: Viacheslav and Svitlana Shkurenko

History
- First flight: 8 October 2006

The ViS ViS-3 is a high wing, single-engine ultralight, designed and built in Ukraine. The production version is designated as KhAZ-30 (ХАЗ-30).

== Design and development ==
The ViS-3 is a two-seat, side by side, conventionally laid out ultralight high-wing monoplane. It first flew on 8 October 2006 and its flight test programme led through the revised ViS-5 to the Kharkiv State Aviation Plant built KhAZ-30 (ХАЗ-30) production aircraft, which first appeared in public on 22 May 2012. The development programme has brought small but significant changes to the design, chiefly in the removal of forward sweep and the addition of dihedral and flaps. It is mostly of metal construction, though with fabric-covered wings. These have straight edges and constant chord and are braced by a single streamlined strut on each side, forward leaning from the lower fuselage to the wing.

The fuselage is noticeably shallow, with a long cabin glazed ahead and behind the wing, both above and to the sides. A 73.5 kW (99 hp) Rotax 912 ULS flat four engine in the nose drives a three-blade propeller. The rectangular tailplane is set well back; the ViS-3 had mass balanced elevators, developed on the ViS-5 to include aerodynamic (horn) balances and slightly increased in span. There is a tall fin and rudder, also straight-edged but swept; the rudder has a prominent trim tab. A fixed tricycle undercarriage has spring cantilever main legs and cantilever-mounted, castoring nosewheel.

== Variants ==
Data from Jane's All the World's Aircraft 2013–14, p. 656-7

ViS-3
First prototype, flown 8 October 2006.
ViS-5
Production prototype. Unswept wings with flaps and span 75 mm (3 in) less than ViS-3, length 145 mm (6 in) greater.
KhAZ-30 (ХАЗ-30)
Designation of production aircraft. 80 kg (176 lb) heavier empty, 16% greater fuel capacity than ViS-3. Public debut 22 May 2012.

== Specifications (ViS-3) ==

Data from Jane's All the World's Aircraft 2013-14, p.656-7

General characteristics

- Capacity: Two
- Length: 6.32 m (20 ft 9 in)
- Wingspan: 8.956 m (29 ft 5 in)
- Height: 2.225 m (7 ft 4 in)
- Wing area: 12.40 m^{2} (133.5 sq ft) gross
- Empty weight: 315 kg (694 lb)
- Max takeoff weight: 540 kg (1,190 lb)
- Fuel capacity: 60 L (13.2 Imp gal; 15.8 US gal); 43kg (94 lb)
- Powerplant: 1 × Rotax 912 ULS liquid cooled flat four, 73.5 kW (98.6 hp)
- Propellers: 3-bladed P.103.5, 1.75 m (5 ft 9 in) diameter

Performance

- Maximum speed: 180 km/h (110 mph, 97 kn)
- Cruise speed: 150 km/h (93 mph, 81 kn)
- g limits: +4/-2
- Rate of climb: 6.0 m/s (1,180 ft/min) maximum, at sea level
