= Khaz-e Bahari =

Khaz-e Bahari خازبهاري
- Village
- Location within Iran
- Coordinates: 28°40′31″N 60°51′37″E
- Country: Iran
- Province: Sistan and Baluchestan
- County: Khash
- Bakhsh: Nukabad
- Rural District: Eskelabad

Population (2006)
  - Total: 10
- Time zone: UTC+3:30 (IRST)
  - Summer (DST): UTC+4:30 (IRDT)

Khaz-e Bahari (Persian: خازبهاري, also Romanized as Khāz-e Bahārī) is a village in Eskelabad Rural District, Nukabad District, Khash County, Sistan and Baluchestan Province, Iran. At the 2006 census, its population was 10, in 7 families.
