= Khazaliyeh =

Khazaliyeh خزعليه
- Village
- Location within Iran
- Coordinates: 30°49′55″N 48°41′11″E
- Country: Iran
- Province: Khuzestan
- County: Shadegan
- Bakhsh: Central
- Rural District: Hoseyni

Population (2006)
  - Total: 69
- Time zone: UTC+3:30 (IRST)
  - Summer (DST): UTC+4:30 (IRDT)

Khazaliyeh (Persian: خزعليه, also Romanized as Khaz‘alīyeh; also known as Khaz‘alīā, Khaz-e Bālā, and Khaz-e-’Olya) is a village in Hoseyni Rural District, in the Central District of Shadegan County, Khuzestan Province, Iran. At the 2006 census, its population was 69, in 15 families.
