= Kalinin K-7 =

1933 heavy experimental aircraft by Konstantin Kalinin

K-7
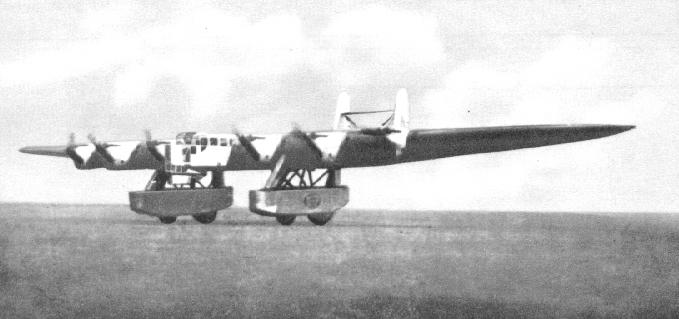

General information
- Type: Heavy bomber/Civilian transport
- National origin: Soviet Union
- Designer: Konstantin Kalinin
- Status: Destroyed in crash
- Number built: 1

History
- First flight: 11 August 1933

The Kalinin K-7 (Russian: Калинин К-7) was a heavy experimental aircraft designed and tested in the Soviet Union in the early 1930s. It was of unusual configuration, with twin booms and large underwing pods housing fixed landing gear and machine gun turrets. In the passenger version, seats were arranged inside the 2.3-meter thick (7 ft 7 in) wings. The airframe was welded from KhMA chrome-molybdenum steel. The original design called for six engines in the wing leading edge, but when the projected loaded weight was exceeded, two more engines were added to the trailing edges of the wing, one left and one right of the central passenger pod. Nemecek states in his book that at first only one further pusher engine was added.

== Design ==
The K-7 was designed by World War I aviator and Soviet aircraft designer Konstantin Kalinin at the aviation design bureau he headed in Kharkiv, Ukraine, It was one of the biggest aircraft built before the jet age. It featured an unusual arrangement of six tractor engines on the wing leading edge and a single engine in pusher configuration at the rear.

The K-7 design had an intended capacity of 120 passengers and 7,000 kg (15,000 lb) of mail, or 112 fully equipped paratroopers when configured for military transport. In bomber configuration it was planned to be armed with 8 × 20 mm autocannons, 8 × 7.62 mm machine guns and up to 9,600 kg (21,200 lb) of bombs.

== Development ==
The K-7 was built in two years in Kharkiv, starting in 1931.

The K-7 first flew on 11 August 1933. The very brief first flight showed instability and serious vibration caused by the airframe resonating at the engine frequency. The solution to this was thought to be to shorten and strengthen the tail booms, little being known then about the natural frequencies of structures and their response to vibration. The aircraft completed seven test flights before a crash due to structural failure of one of the tail booms on 21 November 1933.

The existence of the aircraft had only recently been announced by Pravda, which declared it was "victory of the utmost political importance", since it had been built with Soviet, rather than imported, steel.

The accident killed 14 people aboard and one on the ground. Flight speculated that sabotage was suspected, as the investigating committee had representation by the state security organization, the Joint State Political Directorate (OGPU).

However, there appeared recently some speculation in the Russian aviation press about the role of politics and the competing design office of Andrei Tupolev, suggesting possible sabotage. Although two more prototypes were ordered in 1933, the project was cancelled in 1935 before they could be completed.

== Specifications (K-7) ==
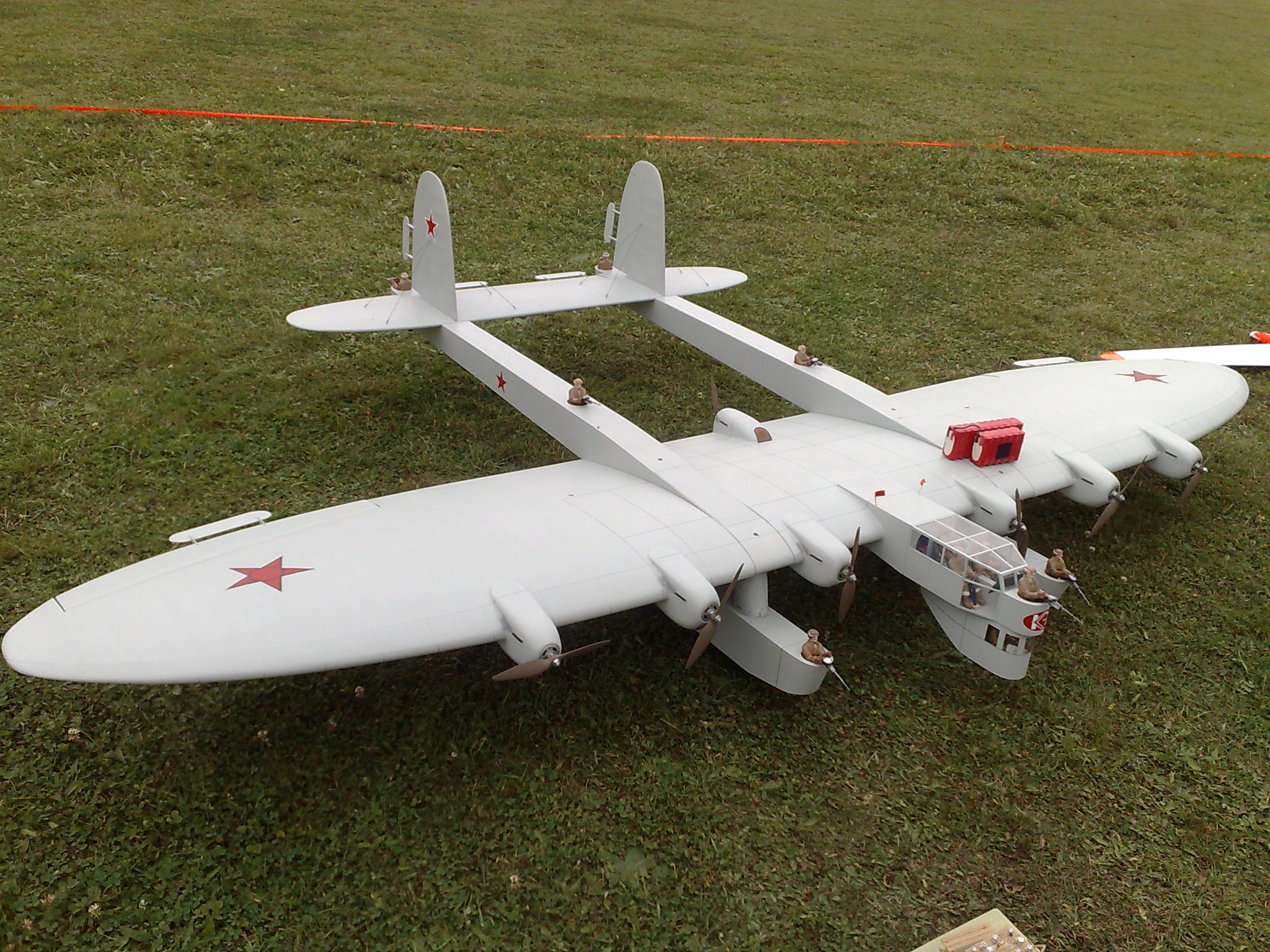
A detailed scale model of the K-7

Data from Istoriya konstruktskii samoletov v SSSR do 1938 g. (3 izd.), The Osprey Encyclopedia of Russian Aircraft 1875-1995

General characteristics

- Crew: 11 (2 pilots, navigator/bombardier, radio operator/gunner (nose 20 mm cannon), flight engineer, 4 gunners (twin DA machine-guns in four gondola positions), 2 gunners (20 mm cannon in tail boom tips)
- Capacity: (120 passengers / 7,000 kg (15,432 lb) cargo, in civilian configuration)
- Length: 28 m (91 ft 10 in)
- Wingspan: 53 m (173 ft 11 in)
- Height: 12.4 m (40 ft 8 in) (estimated to top of engine nacelle)
- Wing area: 454 m^{2} (4,890 sq ft)
- Aspect ratio: 6.2
- Airfoil: root: TsAGI R-II (22%); tip: TsAGI R-II (19%)
- Empty weight: 24,400 kg (53,793 lb)
- Gross weight: 38,000 kg (83,776 lb) normal; 42,400 kg (93,500 lb) maximum bombload
- Max takeoff weight: 46,500 kg (102,515 lb)
- Fuel capacity: 9,130 L (2,410 US gal; 2,010 imp gal) in wing tanks
- Powerplant: 7 × Mikulin AM-34F V-12 liquid-cooled piston engines, 560 kW (750 hp) each
- Propellers: 2-bladed fixed-pitch propellers

Performance

- Maximum speed: 225 km/h (140 mph, 121 kn)
- Cruise speed: 180 km/h (110 mph, 97 kn)
- Range: 1,600 km (990 mi, 860 nmi)
- Service ceiling: 4,000 m (13,000 ft)
- Wing loading: 84 kg/m^{2} (17 lb/sq ft)
- Power/mass: 0.084 kW/kg (0.051 hp/lb)

Armament

- Guns:
  3× 20 mm (0.79 in) cannon (at least)
  8× 7.62 mm (0.30 in) machine guns (at least)
- Bombs: maximum 19,000 kg (42,000 lb) of bombs

== See also ==
- Tupolev ANT-20
