= Khakas Aluminium Smelter =

Aluminium Smelter in Russia

Coordinates: 53°12′03″N 91°26′18″E

Khakas Aluminium Smelter Хака́сский алюми́ниевый заво́д
- Industry: Mining; Metallurgy
- Headquarters: Sayanogorsk
- Products: Aluminium; Aluminium alloys
- Revenue: Russia (2008)
- Owner: RUSAL

Khakas Aluminium Smelter (Russian: Хака́сский алюми́ниевый заво́д, Khakasskiy Alyuminiyevy Zavod) or KhAZ (Russian: ХАЗ) is an aluminium smelter located near Sayanogorsk, Russia. Owned by the Russian aluminium industry champion RUSAL, it is one of the largest companies in the Russia's Republic of Khakassia. It was the first major aluminium plant opened in post-Soviet Russia.

The construction began in 2004. The first metal was produced in December 2006, and the project capacity of 300,000 tons of aluminium per year was achieved in October 2007. Total investment in the project reached $750 million.
