= Aughinish Alumina =

Alumina refinery in Ireland

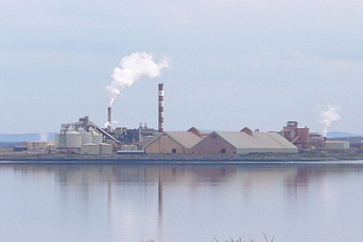
- View of the refinery in 2010
- Built: 1978–1983
- Operated: Since September 1983; 43 years ago
- Location: Aughinish, County Limerick, Ireland
- Coordinates: 52.626389°N 9.064722°W
- Industry: Refining
- Products: Alumina
- Employees: 460
- Area: 222 ha (550 acres)
- Owner: Rusal
- Website: rusal.ru

Aughinish Alumina is an alumina refinery situated on the Shannon Estuary in Aughinish, County Limerick, Ireland. It is the largest alumina refinery in Europe, and is owned by Rusal, a Russian aluminium company headquartered in Moscow. The plant imports bauxite by sea, refines it into alumina using the Bayer process, stores resulting waste in an on-site disposal area, and exports the finished alumina by ship for use in aluminium production. By the end of 2024, about 460 people were employed at the plant.

The refinery has been the centre of several controversies, including for environmental concerns since at least the 1980s, and the continued export of alumina to Russia since its invasion of Ukraine in 2022.

== History ==
The refinery was established by the Alcan Aluminum (Alcan) company in the early 1970s when Ireland had a lack of raw materials, including aluminium, with the worldwide aluminium industry increasing and Ireland joining the European Economic Community (EEC) in 1973. In 1999 the plant was sold to the Swiss group Glencore, which merged in 2007 with the Russian companies SUAL Group and Rusal putting the refinery under Russian ownership.

In March 2022, Taoiseach Micheál Martin rejected a request from the Ukrainian ambassador to Ireland, Larysa Gerasko, to shut down the facility due to its links to the Russian government; he cited its importance as an employer and major producer of alumina in Europe.

=== Controversies ===
==== Environmental issues ====
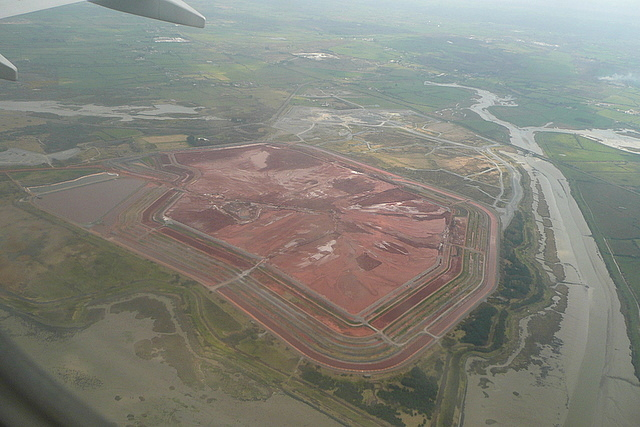
Aerial view of the bauxite residue waste disposal area in 2010

Aughinish Alumina has faced opposition from environmental groups and local farmers due to its on-site storage of red mud, a byproduct of bauxite processing.

The plant, which was built in the late 1970s, attracted attention during the 1980s as environmental and farmers groups raised concerns about increased deaths and health impacts on livestock in the area. By the 1990s, the environmental concerns had grown to become a governmental issue involving Greenpeace Ireland, local residents and farmers. It was also reported that the plant's operators had breached planning laws by "releasing massive quantities of sulphur dioxide gas into the atmosphere in the mid-[19]90s".

In 2002, the Environmental Protection Agency reportedly sued the plant's operators for failing to inform the agency about accidental effluent discharges at the site. As of 2021, the plant's waste storage facility consisted of a 183 hectare disposal area for bauxite residue. Although the High Court quashed the planning permission granted for an expansion of the bauxite waste dump in 2022, and despite continued objections from local farmers and environmental groups, a revised application to expand the disposal area was approved in 2025.

In 2026, The Irish Times reported that ground water at the site contained arsenic levels that were 133 times above the levels legally allowed and that some other contaminants were 4,700 times more that the legal safe thresholds.

==== Exports to Russia since 2022 ====
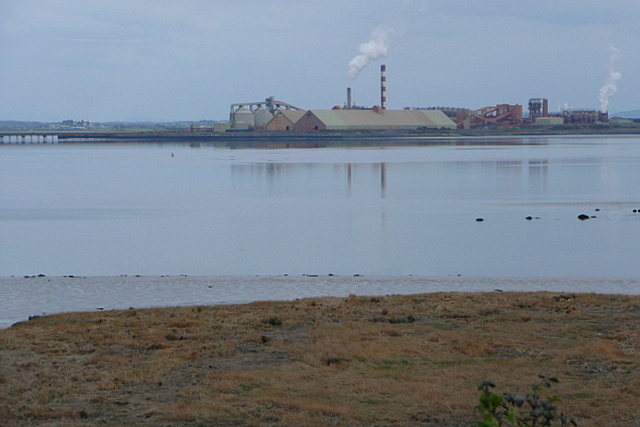
The Aughinish plant, located on the Shannon Estuary, imports raw materials and exports processed alumina by ship

In March 2026, an investigation carried out by the Organized Crime and Corruption Reporting Project (OCCRP) and its partners found that the refinery indirectly supplies materials to sanctioned Russian arms manufacturers. Following the investigation, Taoiseach Micheál Martin said that the findings would be reviewed and expressed his concern about the reports of materials from Aughinish Alumina being used to supply Russia's war effort, but defended the refinery's continued operation and stressed the importance of its exports to the European Union's supply chain, and he stated that alumina was not covered by sanctions.

The refinery's links to the Russian military supply chain faced renewed criticism in early May, with the Irish Government coming under pressure from dozens of MEPs in the European Parliament to prevent exports to Russia; vice-president of the European Parliament, Pina Picierno wrote that "It is unacceptable that, while the EU funds Ukraine's defence, a Russian-owned company operates undisturbed within a member state, supplying the Kremlin’s military industry". David O'Sullivan, the chief sanctions envoy of the EU, and a former Irish diplomat, stated that the European Commission would restrict access to "to commodities that could be processed and then used for the production of military equipment" by Russia. The Taoiseach said on 29 May that the Government was not contemplating nationalising the refinery, and said that sanctioning the plant would harm the EU more than it would Russia, describing the proposition as “self-defeating”.

In early June Minister for Enterprise Peter Burke contradicted figures from the Central Statistics Office (CSO) which showed that 83% of Aughinish Alumina’s total exports (200,619 tonnes) were sent to Russia in the first quarter of 2026. He said that the true figure was around 45% and that his department had discovered the discrepancy during its investigation into the refinery's exports. The original inaccuate figures had been provided to the CSO by Aughinish Alumina; the company later blamed this on a clerical error. The following day the Ukrainian embassy in Ireland issued a statement expressing their "serious concern" over the plant's continued export of alumina to Russia; however, Irish Minister of State Niall Collins defended the Government's handling of the issue.

The Taoiseach also expressed concern that products from the plant would be “used to assist Russia in waging its brutal war against Ukraine”, and said that "the details" of an investigation being undertaken by the Department of Enterprise into the export of alumina from the refinery would be published; however, he did not provide a timeline for the completion of the investigation. Irish MEPs and politicians urged the Government to expedite the investigation, with Fine Gael's four MEPs issuing a joint statement voicing their concern that the plant could be supporting Russia's invasion of Ukraine.

On 5 June, The Irish Times reported that according to a confidential report by Swedish tax authorities, the sanctioned Russian oligarch Oleg Deripaska still holds a controlling share of Rusal, the owner of the refinery. This coincided with the arrest of the chief executive of the Kubal aluminium smelter in Sundsvall, another facility owned by Rusal, by Sweden’s special forces police in May. Taoiseach Micheál Martin said he was unaware of links to the Russian military supply chain; however, this was contradicted by records showing that he had been shown a briefing document regarding the connection while serving as Tánaiste and Minister for Foreign Affairs in 2023.

During a visit to Dublin to meet the Irish Government, in which she met both Taoiseach Micheál Martin and Minister for Foreign Affairs Helen McEntee, the EU High Representative for Foreign Affairs Kaja Kallas said that it was important that the Government clarified whether Aughinish Alumina was supplying the Russian arms manufacturers. Kallas said that while alumina exports to Russia were not currently covered under sanctions that "Europe must close all loopholes"; she also said that the European Commission trusted Ireland to conduct the investigation into the refinery. McEntee stated that the Government expected its investigation to receive findings by the end of the month, and that if material from the plant was found to be entering the Russian military supply chain that Ireland would support restrictions on its exports. During a debate in the Dáil the Taoiseach said the Government would work with the European Commission, but said there was "no magical solution" and that any sanctions were ultimately a "European competency". The next day Tánaiste and Minister for Finance Simon Harris said that Ireland would not support any measures that assist the Russian military industry, and that it could not "cherry-pick" when it comes to further sanctions. Both he and the Taoiseach also said that it was important to allow the investigation by the Department of Enterprise to be completed. On 8 July 2026, the European Parliament, including several Irish MEPs, voted to ban alumina exports to Russia.

== See also ==
- International sanctions during the Russo-Ukrainian war
- Russia in the European energy sector
- Russian shadow fleet
