= Kalinin K-3 =

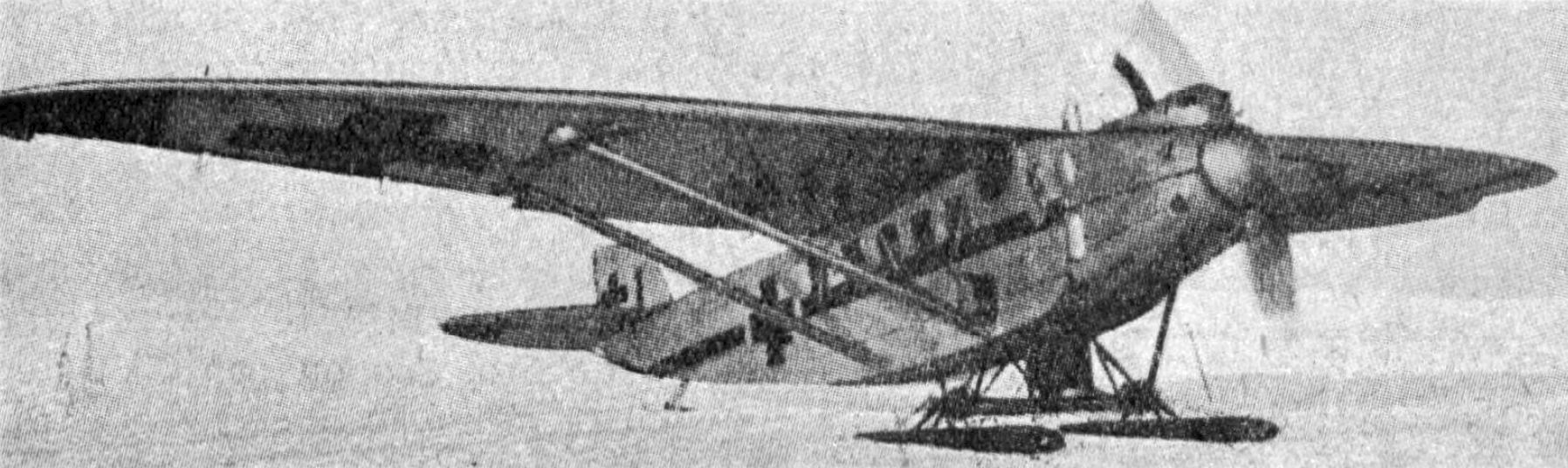

General information
- Type: Air ambulance
- National origin: Soviet Union

The Kalinin K-3 was a Soviet air ambulance monoplane designed by Konstantin Kalinin. The K-3 was based, in part, on both the Kalinin K-1 and K-2 and was powered by a BMW IV engine. It had a metal airframe and an enclosed cabin, holding four passengers or two stretchers. A large hatch allowed stretchers to be easily loaded and unloaded. Production of the K-3 began in 1927.

== Operators ==
Soviet Union

- Soviet Air Force

== Specifications ==
General characteristics

- Crew: 1
- Capacity: 4 passengers, 740kg
- Length: 11.25 m (36 ft 11 in)
- Wingspan: 16.76 m (55 ft 0 in)
- Wing area: 40 m^{2} (430 sq ft)
- Empty weight: 1,560 kg (3,439 lb)
- Max takeoff weight: 2,300 kg (5,071 lb)
- Powerplant: 1 × BMW IV inline engine, 180 kW (240 hp)

Performance

- Maximum speed: 170 km/h (110 mph, 92 kn)
- Cruise speed: 140 km/h (87 mph, 76 kn)
- Range: 730 km (450 mi, 390 nmi)
- Service ceiling: 3,880 m (12,730 ft)
