= Rusal =

Russian aluminium company

United Company RUSAL, IPJSC
- Type: Open joint-stock company
- Traded as: SEHK: 486; MCX: RUAL
- Industry: Aluminium
- Founded: 2000
- Headquarters: Moscow, Russia
- Key people: Evgenii Nikitin (CEO); Bernard Zonneveld (Chairman)
- Products: Aluminium; Aluminium alloys; Bauxite; Alumina
- Revenue: $14.8 billion (2025)
- Operating income: $126 million (2025)
- Net income: $−455 million (2025)
- Total assets: $25.1 billion (2025)
- Total equity: $11.7 billion (2025)
- Number of employees: 64,000
- Website: rusal.com

United Company Rusal (Russian: МКПАО «ОК РУСАЛ») is a Russian aluminum company. It was the world's largest primaty aluminium producer, until overtaken by China Hongqiao Group in 2016. Rusal accounts for almost 9% of the world's primary aluminium output and 9% of the world's alumina production. Rusal was founded by major Russian industrialist Oleg Deripaska.

The United Company was formed by the merger of Rusal, SUAL, and the alumina assets of Glencore, completed in March 2007.

The company is incorporated in Jersey, where it has its financial centre, but its headquarters are in Moscow, Russian Federation. UC Rusal is a public limited company and its shares are traded on the Moscow and Hong Kong stock exchanges. Since 25 September 2020, the company changed its place of registration from Jersey to Kaliningrad, Russia. In 2021 Rusal announced a proposal to demerge its high carbon assets and change its name to AL+.

== Company history ==
=== Predecessor companies 1991–2000 ===
UC Rusal's roots lie in the business activities of Russian businessman Oleg Deripaska, who entered the metals industry as a commodities agent and broker at the Moscow Trade Stock Exchange (Moskovskaya Tovarnaya Birzha (MTB)) and then at the Russian Commodities and Raw Materials Exchange (Rossiyskaya Tovarno-Syryevaya Birzha (RTSB)). As a broker, Deripaska dealt in a wide range of commodities, including aluminium. His work also included trading with major Russian aluminium smelters.

Between 1991 and 1994, companies set up by Deripaska with the backing of industrialist and entrepreneur Michael Cherney started investing in the shares of Sayanogorsk Aluminum Smelter (SAZ), one of the newest and most modern aluminium plants built in Soviet times (1980–1985). In 1994, Deripaska was elected the General Director of SAZ.

In 1997, the companies controlled by Deripaska underwent a general restructuring, resulting in the creation of Sibirsky Aluminium to manage the aluminium and alumina assets acquired by Deripaska's companies. By 2000, Sibirsky Aluminium managed, among other aluminium-related assets, majority interests in the Sayanogorsk aluminium smelter, the Sayanal foil mill, a fabricating plant in Samara, Russia, and a minority interest in the Nikolaev alumina refinery in Ukraine.

=== Founding of Rusal and company expansion 2000–2007 ===
Gradual strategic acquisitions and growth projects eventually led to the creation of one of the world's largest aluminium and alumina producers. Rusal has historically opted to integrate its assets under centralized operational and management control fully. The company has achieved increased production and efficiency in most of its acquired facilities through production "creep" (improvements achieved through targeted improvements to key processes), as well as by undertaking key modernization and expansion projects.

Rusal was founded in 2000 after Sibirsky Aluminium and Millhouse Capital, owned by Roman Abramovich, agreed to merge their aluminium and alumina assets.

By 2002, Sibirsky Aluminium and Millhouse Capital were managing controlling stakes in the Armenal foil mill in Armenia and the Belaya Kalitva metallurgical plant and Novokuznetsk aluminium smelter in Russia, and also took under management the Friguia bauxite and alumina complex and Bauxite of Kindia Company in Guinea to secure bauxite and alumina supply for its Russian smelters. In 2002, Rusal also established the Engineering and Technology Center in Krasnoyarsk, which has since become the foundation of the company's internal R&D projects.

In 2003, Millhouse Capital sold its 50% stake in Rusal to Basic Element, which held the remaining half of the shares and belongs to Deripaska. In Ukraine, RUSAL increased its share in the Nikolaev alumina refinery to 98%.

In 2004, Rusal made the strategic decision to focus on its upstream business and began disposing of its downstream assets, including the sale of its fabricating division to Alcoa in January 2005. The divestiture process was largely completed in 2006 with the distribution of certain aluminium construction plants and other non-core assets to companies controlled by RUSAL's beneficial owner. In 2004, Rusal obtained a licence to develop bauxite mines in Guyana, and the Bauxite Company of Guyana was subsequently founded.

From 2004 to 2006, RUSAL acquired several strategically important assets worldwide. In 2004, RUSAL acquired a 90% interest in the Boxitogorsk alumina refinery in Russia and increased its holding in the Nikolaev alumina refinery to 100%.

In 2005, RUSAL bought a 50% stake in the Komi alumina project from SUAL and became its partner in the project, which involved the construction of an integrated bauxite and alumina complex in Russia's Komi Republic.

Also in 2005, RUSAL completed the acquisition of a 20% equity interest in one of the world's largest alumina refineries in terms of production capacity, Queensland Alumina Limited, located in Queensland, Australia.

Furthermore, Rusal purchased assets of a cathode plant in Lingshi County of Shanxi Province, China. In April 2008, the company acquired assets of another cathode plant in Taigu County of Shanxi Province, China, which have been integrated into the existing cathode plant in Lingshi.

In 2006, Rusal acquired assets of the state-owned Aroaima Mining Company in Guyana, acquired the remaining equity interest in the Friguia bauxite and alumina complex in Guinea, completed an extensive retrofit of the Armenal foil mill and commissioned the Khakas aluminium smelter in Russia, one of the most advanced aluminium production facilities in the world. Rusal also acquired a 56.16% equity interest in the Sardinian alumina refinery, Eurallumina.

In May 2006, Rusal and RusHydro signed a cooperation agreement for the construction of the Boguchanskaya hydropower station (HPP) and the Boguchansky aluminium smelter. Rusal increased ownership in the Bratsk, Krasnoyarsk, Sayanogorsk, and Novokuznetsk aluminium smelters, the Achinsk and Boksitogorsk alumina refineries, and the Russian National Aluminium and Magnesium Institute (VAMI) to 100% in November 2006, and in Sayanogorsk in June 2007.

To stay competitive, the VAMI and SibVAMI aluminium and magnesium research institutes became the backbone for engineering and technology centres involved in the development of new, unique production technologies, including the RA-300 and RA-400 reduction cells for Rusal. The new technologies allowed for large-scale greenfield and brownfield projects. In 2005, Rusal created its own engineering and construction subsidiary, Rusal-Engineering Development Limited, responsible for modernization and construction projects.

In December 2006, Rusal acquired through a privatisation process a 77.5% equity interest in the Aluminium Smelter Company of Nigeria (ALSCON). The Group acquired a further 7.5% equity interest in ALSCON from MAN Ferrostaal AG in January 2008.

== UC Rusal ==
In late March 2007, the merger between Rusal, its domestic competitor SUAL, as well as the bauxite and alumina assets of Swiss commodities trading group Glencore, created UC Rusal. The merger created the world's largest aluminium company at the time, with assets in 17 countries across five continents, including 16 aluminium smelters, 12 alumina refineries, eight bauxite mines, three powder metallurgy plants, three silicon smelters, three secondary aluminium plants, three aluminium foil mills, two cryolite plants, and one cathode plant. The merger was completed in March 2007, at which time the newly formed company was estimated to have pro forma sales of $12 billion and production capacity of approximately four million tonnes of aluminum and 11 million tonnes of alumina.

=== Company consolidation and expansion projects ===
In November 2007, Rusal signed a cooperation agreement with Samruk-Energo, a subsidiary of Samruk-Kazyna, on the creation of a 50/50 joint venture to operate the Bogatyr Komir LLP, the largest coal mining company in Kazakhstan.

Because of a string of mergers and acquisitions, particularly that of Norilsk Nickel, UC Rusal had a high level of debt, which was exacerbated by the 2008 financial crisis. To be able to retain its stake in Norilsk Nickel, and to avoid having to float the stake to foreign lenders, UC Rusal received a $4.5 billion loan from Russian state bank Vnesheconombank to repay debts to foreign creditors. As part of its debt consolidation efforts in 2009, UC Rusal reduced the costs of its operations by 25%. In December 2009, a final agreement between the company and 72 Russian and international lenders to refinance $17 billion of debt was reached.

In January 2009, Oleg Deripaska was appointed CEO of Rusal, replacing Alexander Bulygin, who had held the position for three years.

In January 2010, UC RUSAL was listed on the Hong Kong Stock Exchange with its IPO price of HK$10.8 per share and capital raising of US$2.2 billion. The IPO attracted investors such as Nathaniel Rothschild, Robert Kuok, Paulson & Co, John Paulson and Vnesheconombank. Rusal also traded global depository receipts on the NYSE Euronext in Paris until voluntarily delisted on 7 May 2018. The Moscow Stock Exchange admitted Rusal common stock on 23 March 2015.

August 2011 saw Rusal reach an agreement with Sberbank to extend the maturity of debts until 2016, thereby cancelling VEB's loan used to repay debts to lenders.

In October 2011, UC Rusal announced that it had completed the refinancing of all outstanding debt payments worth $11.4 billion. As a result, the company was freed from all investment and dividend payment restrictions, and announced new investments into the modernisation of old smelters and construction of new smelters in Siberia.

With Chinese aluminium demand growing due to rapid urbanization and industrialization, UC Rusal signed a joint venture agreement with China North Industries Corporation (NORINCO) in April 2012. Rusal also signed a memorandum of understanding with one of its main competitors, Shandong Xinfa Group, on the study of future potential cooperation areas, such as joint ventures.

In March 2014, UC Rusal entered into a 50/50 joint venture with Israeli automotive component manufacturer Omen High Pressure Die Casting to produce automotive components.

Resulting from massive overcapacity in the aluminium market due to China increasing its output of primary aluminium, global aluminium prices fell in the years 2007 to 2013, leading Rusal to report a loss of US$3.2bn in 2014. The company asked creditors to agree to delay payments on part of its US$10bn net debt pile. In August that year, national and international lenders agreed to allow the restructuring of its debt.

In November 2014, Vladislav Solovyov was appointed as Rusal's CEO, while Deripaska assumed the role of company president.

In 2016, UC Rusal signed another joint venture agreement with Hebei Joy Sense Cable Co. (HJSC), a Chinese firm, to produce aluminum cable for electrical applications.

In 2017, Rusal issued two Eurobonds to finance its debts. The first one, worth US$600 million, was issued in February, followed by a second one in April, worth US$500 million. Also in February, plans were announced to sell 10 billion yuan worth of seven-year onshore bonds to finance purchases in China, making Rusal the first foreign company to offer panda bonds on the Shanghai Stock Exchange. The company also agreed on a pre-export finance mechanism with international lenders worth US$1.7 billion for debt refinancing.

In April 2017, Rusal signed a joint venture with Indian firm Runaya Metsource for producing aluminum paste and powder, with commercial activities set to commence in 2018. In 2021, the company's revenue amounted to 596 billion rubles.

In April 2022, Rusal America Corporation was sold to former executives Brian Hesse and Andrey Donets and subsequently renamed PerenniAL.

In October 2023, Rusal acquired a 30% stake in China's Hebei Wenfeng New Materials (HWNM) for 1.91 billion yuan ($261.6 million).

== Company structure and activities ==
As of 2016, UC Rusal's most significant shareholders are En+ Group with a controlling stake of 48.13%, along with Onexim Group (13.7%) and SUAL (15,80%). Amokenga Holdings owns 8.75%, and Toni Shterev owns 0.1% of the shares in Rusal.a wholly owned subsidiary of Glencore. The remaining 13.37% accounts for the public float, and shareholding by the company management (0.25%).

It was announced on 11 August that Onexim agreed to sell 7% of its Rusal stake to SUAL. In February, Onexim had already sold 3.3% to SUAL. Once the sale is approved, Onexim will retain a 6.7% stake in Rusal, while SUAL's will increase to 22.80%.

As of 2023, UC Rusal's biggest shareholders are En+ Group with a controlling stake of 56.88% and SUAL (25.52%); the company's free-float stands at 17.6%. The company's revenue in Russia for 2021 amounted to more than 6 billion euros.

Financial performance
Year ended 31 December (in USD million)	2020	2019	2018	2017	2016	2015	2014	2013	2012	2011	2010	2009
Revenue	8,566	9,711	10,280	9,969	7,983	8,680	9,357	9,760	10,891	12,291	10,979	8,165
Net profit	759	960	1,698	1,222	1,179	558	91	3,322	337	237	2,867	821
Total assets	17,378	17,814	15,777	15,774	14,452	12,809	14,857	20,480	25,401	25,345	26,525	23,886

Product output (in million tonnes)
	2020	2019	2018	2017	2016	2015	2014	2013	2012	2011	2010	2009
Aluminium	3.8	3.8	3.8	3.7	3.7	3.6	3.6	3.9	4.2	4.1	4.1	3.9
Alumina	8.2	7.9	7.8	7.8	7.5	7.4	7.3	7.3	7.5	8.2	7.8	7.3

=== Operations ===
As of the end of 2020, UC Rusal owned nine aluminium smelters, nine alumina refineries, seven bauxite mines worldwide, and four domestic foil rolling mills.

==== Smelters ====
Aluminum production ('000 tonnes)
	2025	2024	2023	2022	2021	2020	2019	2018	2017	2016	2015	2014	2013	2012	2011	2010	2009
Siberia
Bratsk	939	1,002	1,005	1,005	1,009	1,004	1,008	1,009	1,008	1,005	1,005	1,005	1,002	995	988	978	986
Krasnoyarsk	959	1,015	1,014	1,017	1,019	1,020	1,018	1,015	1,019	1,024	1,013	1,005	1,002	1,000	995	979	952
Sayanogorsk	521	531	538	539	536	529	539	536	533	530	525	514	513	541	499	537	530
Novokuznetsk	184	196	204	213	215	215	215	215	215	213	209	207	248	291	286	270	230
Irkutsk	402	423	425	424	424	422	422	419	419	415	410	394	392	413	403	394	349
Taishet	393	288	112	78													2
Khakas	288	307	304	306	303	308	294	291	292	293	289	287	279	295	293	296	297
Western Russia
Bogoslovsk													41	103	124	113	117
Volgograd	69	68	69	70	70	70	69	64	13				112	168	168	155	145
Urals													32	71	77	72	82
Nadvoitsy								6	12	12	12	12	29	60	75	71	57
Kandalaksha	54	54	57	64	63	70	72	72	72	69	66	64	66	71	68	64	56
Volkhov													8	16	16	18	12
World
Zaporozhye															7	25	50
KUBAL	108	109	119	120	124	117	120	125	123	124	116	113	131	129	111	93	70
Alscon													2	22	15	18	11
Total	3,918	3,992	3,848	3,835	3,764	3,755	3,757	3,753	3,707	3,685	3,645	3,601	3,857	4,173	4,123	4,083	3,946

===== Russia =====
Rusal owns and operates eight aluminium smelters, four alumina refineries and three foil rolling mills in Russia:

- Bratsk Aluminium Smelter, Bratsk (56.13°N 101.45°E
- Irkutsk Aluminium Smelter, Shelekhov
- Krasnoyarsk Aluminium Smelter, Krasnoyarsk (56.095°N 93.013°E)
  - First hot metal was produced on 30 April 1964.
- Kandalaksha Aluminium Smelter
- Novokuznetsk Aluminium Smelter, Novokuznetsk
- Nadvoitsy Aluminium Smelter
- Sayanogorsk Aluminium Smelter, Sayanogorsk
- Khakas Aluminium Smelter, Sayanogorsk
- Volgograd Aluminium Smelter
- Urals Aluminium Smelter
- Boguchany Aluminium Smelter
- Bogoslovsk Aluminium Smelter
- Taishet (55.99°N 98.12°E)

===== Ukraine =====
When the smelter was shut down in 2011, Ukraine ceased to produce any primary aluminum. The nationalization of 68% of the stock of PJSC Zaporoshye Aluminium Combine (ZALK) took effect on 9 June 2015 making the Ukraine State Property Fund controlling owner. The remaining 29.5% of Rusals 97.6% holding were confiscated in February 2023.

===== Sweden =====
- Kubal, one of the largest industrial facilities in Central Sweden and the only primary aluminium producer in the country.

===== Nigeria =====
- Aluminium Smelter Company of Nigeria (ALSCON) – Smelter in Akwa Ibom state of Nigeria (4.57°N 7.577°E)

==== Refineries ====
===== Russia =====
- Achinsk Aluminium Refinery (56.23°N 90.416°E)
- Boksitgorsk (59.46°N 33.822°E)
- Bogoslovsk
- Urals
- Pikalyovo (59.524°N 34.161°E)

===== Guinea =====
- Alumina Company of Guinea (100% acquired in 2002-2006; shut down in 2012 and restarted in 2018)

===== Australia =====
- Queensland Alumina Limited – minority ownership

===== Italy =====
- Eurallumina Alumina Refinery

===== Ireland =====
- Aughinish Alumina, Europe's largest bauxite refinery.

===== Jamaica =====
- WINDALCO (93% acquired in 2001 by Glencore, 100% acquired in 2014)
  - Kirkvine Works mothballed since 2009
  - Ewarton Works shut down in 2009 and reopened in 2010
- Alpart (65% acquired in 2004 by Glencore, shut down in 2009, 100% acquired in 2011, 100% sold in 2016)

===== Ukraine =====
- Nikolaev Alumina Refinery (46.77°N 31.95°E)
  - The original 1,000 ktpa plant was commissioned (on 28 July) 1980 and acquired by Rusal in 2000. The bauxite came exclusively from overseas. The plant had the capacity to produce 13 tonnes of high purity Gallium per year (20% of world demand). There was a natural gas captive power plant, but two thirds of electrical energy was supplied by the grid (all figures as of 2009). Production was halted following the Invasion of Ukraine. Employment was 5,000 before the war and was reduced to 400 for continued maintenance. The plant was seized in July 2022 and the seizure was legally finalized on 20 March 2024 making the State Property Fund of Ukraine the owner, who has since been trying to privatize the plant.

==== Bauxite mines ====
===== Russia =====
- Timan
- North Urals
- Sevuralboksitruda

===== Guinea =====
- Compagnie des Bauxites de Kindia
- deposits in the vicinity of the alumina plant at Fria
- Dian-Dian Project, world's largest bauxite deposit with 564 million tonnes proven reserves. Rusal's 3 million tonne per year operation started shipments on 19 June 2018.

===== Guyana =====
- Bauxite Company of Guyana

===== Jamaica =====
All of Rusal's refineries were built in proximity to the deposits.

==== Foil mills ====
- Sayanal
- Ural Foil
- Armenal
- Sayanskaya Folga

=== Joint ventures ===
- UC Rusal – RusHydro, 2005
- UC Rusal – China North Industries Corporation (NORINCO), April 2012
- UC Rusal – Omen High Pressure Die Casting, March 2014
- UC Rusal – Hebei Joy Sense Cable Co. (HJSC), July 2016
- UC Rusal – Runaya Metsource, April 2017
- UC Rusal – SKAD, April 2017
- UC Rusal - Braidy Industries Inc., April 2019

== 2018 U.S. sanctions ==
In April 2018, the United States imposed sanctions against Oleg Deripaska and his business enterprises, including Rusal, along with 23 other Russian nationals and entities in their control. According to The Washington Post, the Trump administration imposed those sanctions because of "Russia's 'malign activity'". The United States Department of the Treasury issued a statement declaring that Deripaska was accused of illegal wiretapping, threatening the lives of business rivals, extortion and racketeering. Other allegations included that Deripaska ordered the murder of a businessman and had links to a Russian organized crime group. On 23 April, however, the U.S. government gave subsidiary Rusal America Corporation's customers "more time to comply with sanctions", even saying it would "consider lifting them if United Company Rusal Plc's major shareholder, Russian tycoon Oleg Deripaska, ceded control of the company." The Department of the Treasury gave these clients until 23 October 2018 to comply with (wind down business) the Rusal sanctions.

In May 2018, the company announced the resignation of CEO Alexandra Bouriko and seven board members to avoid U.S. sanctions against Oleg Deripaska.

In January 2019, the U.S. lifted sanctions after Deripaska reduced his stake in the company to less than 50% and his voting rights to less than 35%. U.S. Senate majority leader Mitch McConnell among others argued that this would maintain pressure on Deripaska without disrupting aluminum markets. In April 2019, the company announced a project in Greenup, Kentucky that would produce flat-rolled aluminum products for the U.S. automotive industry.

== Sustainability ==
In 2017, UC Rusal publicly stated its goal to cover all the energy required to power its aluminium smelters via clean energy by 2020, particularly using hydropower. In 2017, the company's energy mix included 90% renewables. The announcement was in line with UC Rusal's 2015 pledge to support the sustainable production of aluminium upon joining the Aluminium Stewardship Initiative.

As a response to increased demand for sustainably produced aluminium from major downstream industries – particularly the motor, packaging and electronics sectors – Rusal introduced Allow, a low-carbon aluminium brand, in November 2017. According to Reuters, Allow covers roughly 80% of Rusal's total output.

In 2017, Deripaska expressed support for introducing steep carbon taxation to force other firms away from using coal power and reduce the industry's carbon footprint.

Rusal signed an agreement in September 2021 with the UK's Budweiser Brewing Group to produce five million ultra-low carbon beer cans. The cans will be 440 ml in size and come from Rusal's Krasnoyarsk plant in Siberia, which uses hydropower as an energy source.

Rusal reported total CO_{2}eq emissions (direct and indirect) for the twelve months ending 31 December 2020 at 28,604 Kt (+490/+1.7% y-o-y). The growth has slowed compared to the trend since Q4 2018 (CAGR +3.4%).

Rusal's annual total CO2e emissions (direct and indirect) (in kilotonnes)
Dec 2018	Dec 2019	Dec 2020
25,860	28,114	28,604

== Corporate social responsibility ==
=== 2011 Japan earthquake ===
Following the 2011 Tōhoku earthquake and tsunami, UC Rusal donated $600,000 to Japanese children's and cultural heritage foundations. These included the Ashinaga Foundation providing financial and educational support to children; the Yul Foundation supporting the learning process and psychological rehabilitation of pupils; and donations to the Ishinomori Mangattan Museum in Miyagi Prefecture for the city's reconstruction of cultural attractions.

=== 2012 Cholera outbreak in Sierra Leone ===
In 2012, Rusal donated 25 tonnes of medical supplies to Sierra Leone to control the outbreak of cholera in the country as part of its commitment to corporate social responsibility.

=== 2013 Nigeria fresh water projects ===
In 2013, Rusal, in cooperation with Alscon, commissioned the construction of 14 fresh water facilities in Nigeria to provide potable water to more than 10,000 people in the Ikot Abasi region.

=== 2014 Ebola outbreak ===
During the 2014 Ebola outbreak in West Africa, UC Rusal provided logistical support to the international relief efforts. In 2015, the company invested $10 million to build the "Centre for epidemic and microbiological research and treatment" in Guinea to fight the spread of the virus. It also donated medication, as well as sanitary equipment to the Guinean Health Ministry, and was involved in setting up a mobile hospital containing 200 beds. Field trials for a Russian Ebola vaccine were carried out at the centre, and the vaccine was officially launched in August 2017 in Kindia, where the centre is located.

== See also ==
- Aluminium: The Thirteenth Element
- Aluminium in Africa
- List of alumina refineries
