= Kalinin K-12 =

1936 Soviet experimental aircraft

K-12
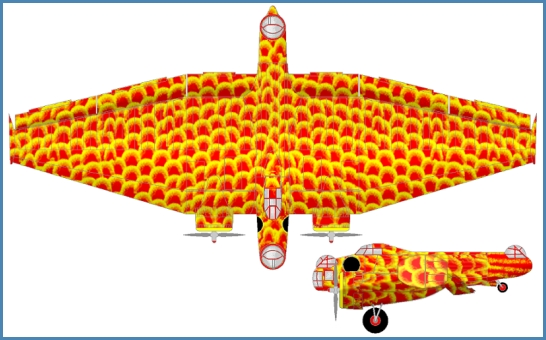

General information
- Type: Tailless bomber
- National origin: Soviet Union
- Manufacturer: OKB Kalinin
- Number built: 1 (10 incomplete production aircraft)

History
- First flight: July 1936

The Kalinin K-12 was a proof-of-concept aircraft developed by the Kalinin Design Bureau in the 1930s.

== Design and development ==
The K-12 was intended as a tailless bomber aircraft. Also called the Kalinin BS-2 or the Zhar-Ptitsa ("Firebird"), it featured welded steel-tube construction with fabric covering, as well as a dummy nose and tail turrets. The K-12 was painted in a garish colour scheme representing a bird. A subscale glider to test the K-12's features flew in 1934, piloted by V.O. Borisov. The K-12 flew in autumn 1936 and was demonstrated at Tushino in August 1937. The full-size K-12, however, was cancelled after Konstantin Kalinin was arrested and executed as an enemy of the state.

== Specifications ==
Data from Rose.

General characteristics

- Crew: 3
- Length: 8 m (26 ft 3 in)
- Wingspan: 18 m (59 ft 1 in)
- Wing area: 72.75 m^{2} (783.1 sq ft)
- Empty weight: 3,070 kg (6,768 lb)
- Gross weight: 4,200 kg (9,259 lb)
- Powerplant: 2 × Shvetsov M-22 9-cylinder air cooled radial engine, 324 kW (435 hp) each
- Propellers: 2-bladed metal variable-pitch propeller

Performance

- Maximum speed: 240 km/h (150 mph, 130 kn) at 3,000 m (9,800 ft)
- Service ceiling: 7,170 m (23,520 ft)
- Take-off distance: 700 m (2,300 ft)
- Landing distance: 300 m (980 ft)

Armament

- Guns: 2 x 7.62 mm (0.300 in) ShKAS machine guns in nose and tail turrets.
- Bombs: 500 kg (1,100 lb) bomb load in a vertical rack
