= Dobrolyot =

Early Soviet aviation company, precursor of Aeroflot

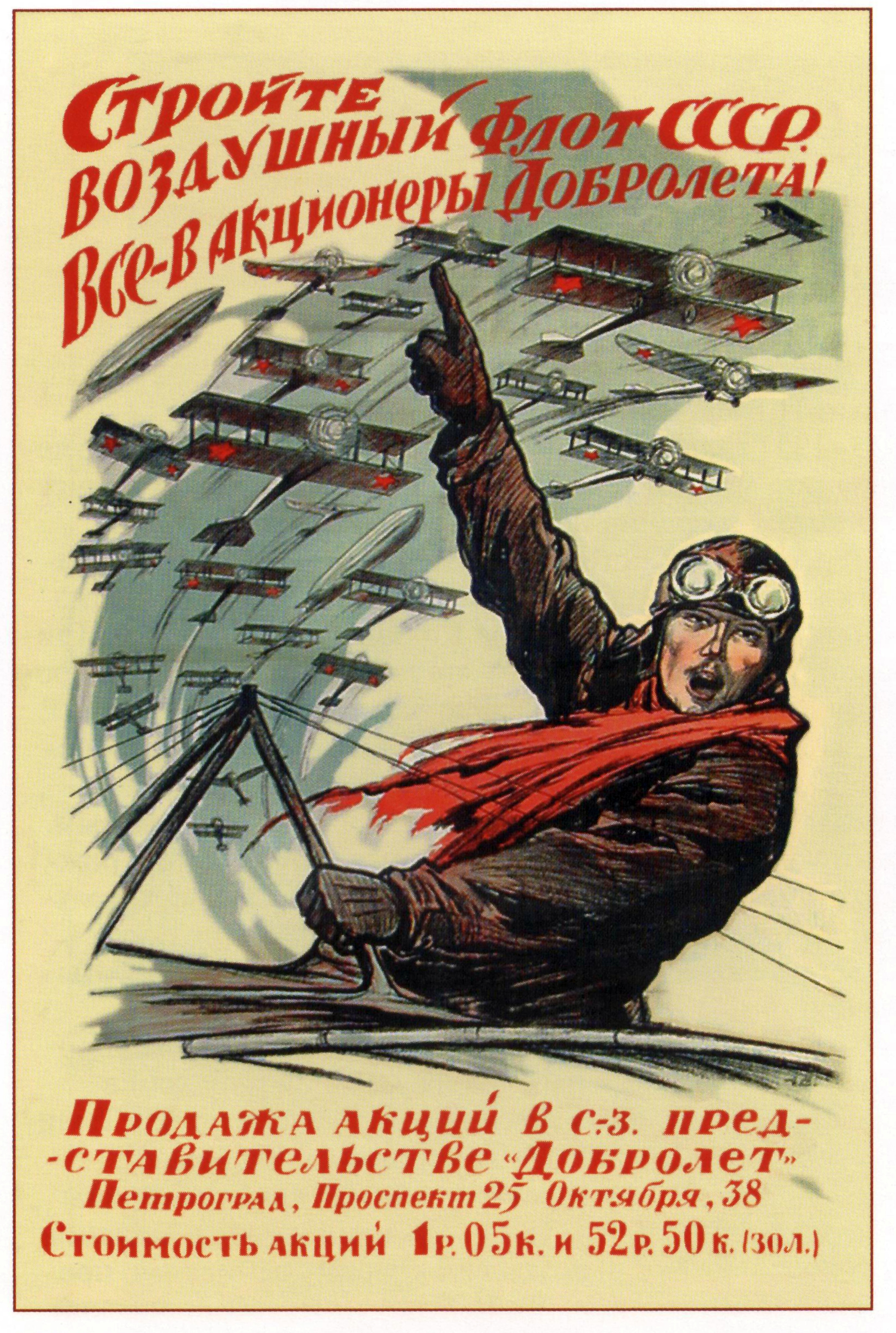
A poster calling on citizens to buy stock in Dobrolyot.

Dobrolyot (Russian: Добролёт), sometimes Dobrolet, officially Russian (Joint-stock) Society of Volunteer Air Fleet (Российское (акционерное) общество добровольного воздушного флота), was an airline that operated from 1923 to 1930 in the Soviet Union. In 1932, it became Aeroflot.

== History ==
=== Early history of Soviet civil aviation (1921–23) ===
On 17 January 1921, the Sovnarkom of the Russian Soviet Federative Socialist Republic published "About Air Transportation". The document signed by its chair Vladimir Lenin set out the basic regulations on air transport over the territory of the RSFSR. The document was significant as it was the first time that a Russian state had declared sovereignty over its airspace. In addition, the document defined rules for the operation of foreign aircraft over the Soviet Union's airspace and territory. After Lenin issued an order, a State Commission was formed on 31 January 1921 for the purpose of civil aviation planning in the Soviet Union.

As a result of the commission's plans, Glavvozdukhflot (Russian: Главвоздухфлот (Главное управление воздушного флота), Chief Administration of the Civil Air Fleet) was established, and it began mail and passenger flights on the Moscow-Oryol-Kursk-Kharkov route on 1 May 1921 using Sikorsky Ilya Muromets aircraft. This was followed by the formation of Deruluft in Berlin on 11 November 1921, as a joint venture between the Soviet Union and Germany. The company, whose aircraft were registered in both Germany and the Soviet Union, began operations on 1 May 1922 with a Fokker F.III flying between Königsberg and Moscow. The service was initially operated twice a week and restricted to the carriage of mail.

On 3 February 1923, Sovnarkom approved plans for the expansion of the Red Air Fleet, and it is this date which was officially recognised as the beginning of civil aviation in the Soviet Union. On 9 February 1923, the Council of Labour and Defence passed a resolution to create the Civil Air Fleet of the USSR. After a resolution of the Central Committee of the Communist Party of the Soviet Union, the Enterprise for Friends of the Air Fleet (ODVF) was founded on 8 March 1923.

=== Dobrolyot (1923–32) ===
In February and March 1923, resolutions of the Council of Labour and Defence and the Central Committee of the Communist Party of the Soviet Union created civil aviation services in the Soviet Union, including the formation of 3 airlines: Dobrolyot in March 1923, Ukrvozdukhput in April 1923, based in Kharkov, and Zakavia in May 1923, based in Tiflis. Dobrolyot was formed in imitation of the Russian Merchant Navy Volunteer Fleet, Dobroflot, formed in 1878. According to its charter, it was formed "for the development of the civil air fleet within the USSR by organizing air lines for the transportation of passengers, mail and cargo, aerial photography and other areas of air fleet application based on the domestic aviation industry". The idea to create the airline was of Leon Trotsky. The basic objectives were the organisation of airmail, cargo and passenger lines, aviation related solutions of national economic problems (for example, aerial photography of localities) and also the development of the domestic aircraft industry. Dobrolyot constructed airports and weather stations.

Artist Alexander Rodchenko developed the corporate identity and advertising strategy of the company. He designed posters encouraging citizens to buy stock in Dobrolet and also designed the "Winged Hammer and Sickle" logo.

A capital of 2 million gold rubles was authorised to fund its early projects and this was later augmented by funds derived from the issuance of shares, which were initially offered to Soviet enterprises at the cost of one gold ruble each. Those who bought 25,000 shares were given the right to use a plane from its fleet. Within a year, capital expanded from 2 million rubles to 5 million rubles.

The airline primarily used aircraft made by Junkers.

Regular flights by Dobrolyot from Moscow to Nizhniy Novgorod commenced on 15 July 1923. In 1923, an agreement was signed establishing a subdivision of Dobrolyot based in Tashkent, operating to points in Soviet Central Asia. Services between Tashkent and Alma Ata began on 27 April 1924, and by the end of 1924 the subdivision had carried 480 passengers and 500 kilograms (1,100 lb) of mail and freight, on a total of 210 flights.

In March 1924, Dobrolyot began operating flights from Sevastopol to Yalta and Yevpatoriya in Crimea. Dobrolyot's route network was extended during the 1925–1927 period to include Kazan and regular flights between Moscow and Kharkov were inaugurated. Dobrolyot flights to Kharkov connected with Ukrvozdukhput services to Kiev, Odessa and Rostov-on-Don. In 1925, Dobrolyot operated 2,000 flights over a distance of 1,000,000 kilometres (620,000 mi), carrying 14,000 passengers and 127,500 kilograms (281,100 lb) of freight, on a route network extending to 5,000 kilometres (3,100 mi).

Ukrvozdukhput merged with Zakavia in 1925. Dobrolyot was transformed from a Russian to an all-Union enterprise on 21 September 1926 as a result of Sovnarkom resolutions, and in 1928 Dobrolyot was merged with Ukrvozdukhput, making it the only civil aviation airline in the Soviet Union.

In 1932, its name was changed to Transaviatsia. Responsibility for all civil aviation activities in the Soviet Union came under the control of the Chief Directorate of the Grazhdansky Vozdushny Flot (Civil Air Fleet) on 25 February 1932, and on 25 March 1932 the name "Aeroflot" was officially adopted for the entire Soviet Civil Air Fleet.

== See also ==
- Dobroflot
