= Salmson B.9 =

B.9
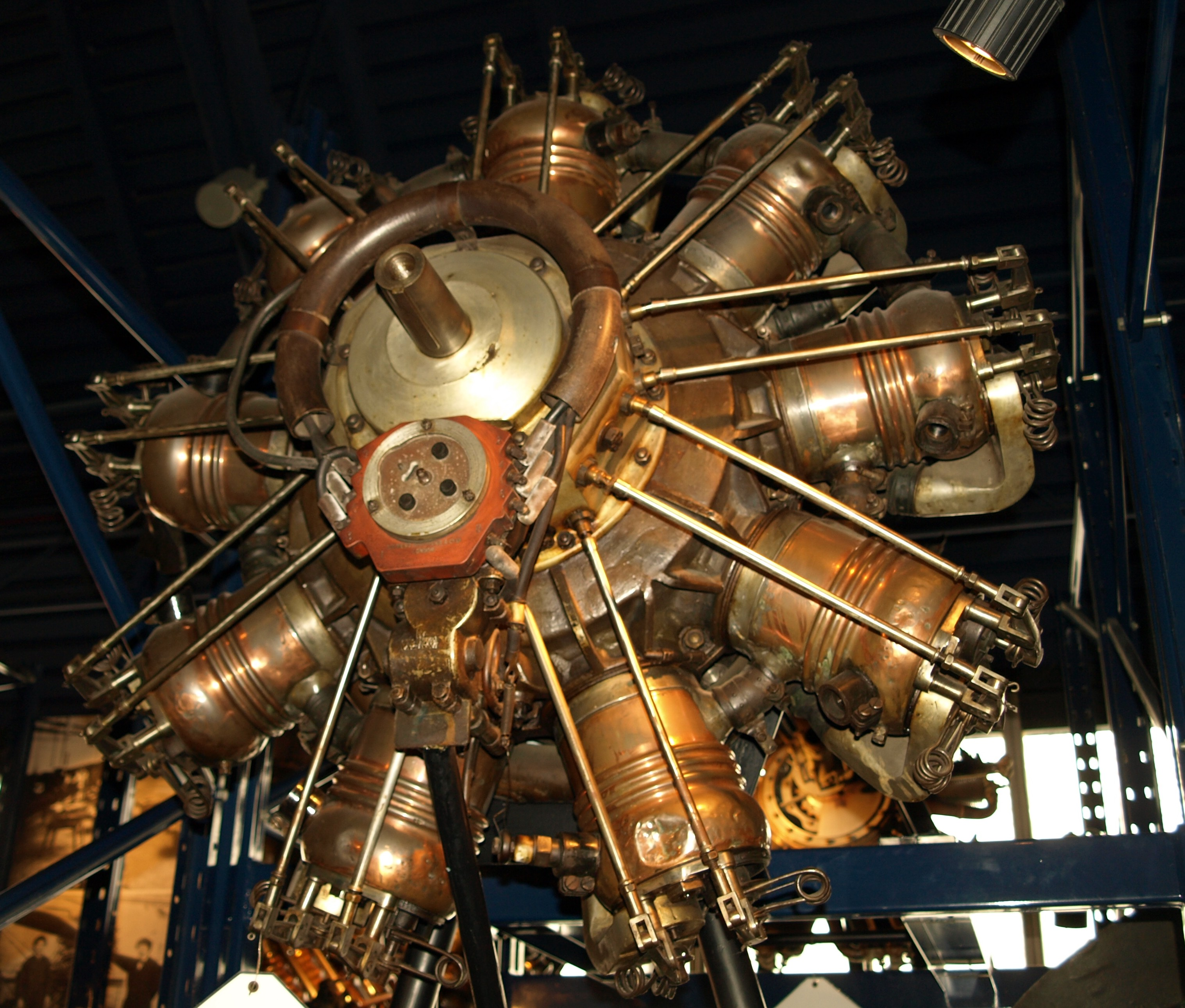
- Nine-cylinder Salmson on display at the London Science Museum
- Type: Radial engine
- Manufacturer: British Salmson
- First run: 1913
- Number built: 106

The Salmson B.9 was a French designed, nine-cylinder, water-cooled radial aero engine that was produced under license in Britain. The engine was produced between August 1914 and December 1918. The French version was designated 9B with a slightly increased capacity variant known as the R.9 or 9R. A further variant known as the M.9 or 9M unusually drove the propeller through a 90-degree gear train.

== Variants ==
Salmson B.9 (Salmson 9B)
140 horsepower (104 kW)
Salmson M.9 (Salmson 9M)
120 horsepower (89 kW), 90-degree propeller drive
Salmson R.9 (Salmson 9R)
160 horsepower (119 kW, increased bore to 140 mm.

== Applications ==
Salmson B.9

- Farman F.27
- Short Admiralty Type 135
- Short Type C
- Short 830
- Voisin LA.S

Salmson M.9

- Blackburn Type L
- Breguet U2
- Voisin LA

Salmson R.9

- Farman F.27

== Engines on display ==
- A watercooled, nine-cylinder Salmson engine is on public display at the London Science Museum.

== Specifications (B.9) ==
Data from Lumsden.

=== General characteristics ===
- Type: Nine-cylinder, single-row, water-cooled radial engine
- Bore: 122 mm (4.3 in)
- Stroke: 140 mm (5.5 in)

=== Components ===
- Valvetrain: Two overhead valves per cylinder
- Cooling system: Water-cooled
- Reduction gear: Direct drive, left hand tractor, right hand pusher

=== Performance ===
- Power output: 104 kW (140 hp) at 1,250 rpm
- Compression ratio: 5.16:1

== See also ==
- Salmson

Comparable engines

- ABC Dragonfly

Related lists

- List of aircraft engines
