= Kalinin K-15 =

Planned rocket fighter

The Kalinin K-15 was a planned rocket fighter designed by Konstantin Kalinin in the early 1930s. The armament most likely would have been two 20mm ShVAK cannons in the wing roots. The aircraft never left the design stage due to Kalinin's arrest while the aircraft was being designed.

The aircraft was designed in a tailless delta-wing configuration, similar to modern delta-wings.

== See also ==
- List of rocket aircraft
