= Haz, Yemen =

Haz حاز
- Village
- Location in Yemen
- Coordinates: 15.51634°N 44.00246°E
- Country: Yemen
- Governorate: Sanaa
- District: Hamdan
- Elevation: 8,500 ft (2,590 m)
- Time zone: UTC+3 (Yemen Standard Time)

Haz (Arabic: حاز Ḥāz) is a large village in Hamdan District of Sanaa Governorate, Yemen. It is an old settlement, with archaeological remains dating back to the pre-Islamic period, and it is also mentioned by name in pre-Islamic inscriptions. During that period, it was the capital of the tribe of Humlan. It was described by the 10th-century writer al-Hamdani, but it had a relatively uneventful history during the middle ages and is absent from most historical narratives from the period.
