= Ukrpovitroshliakh =

Airline of the Soviet Union

Ukrvozdukhput (Ukrpovitroshliakh)
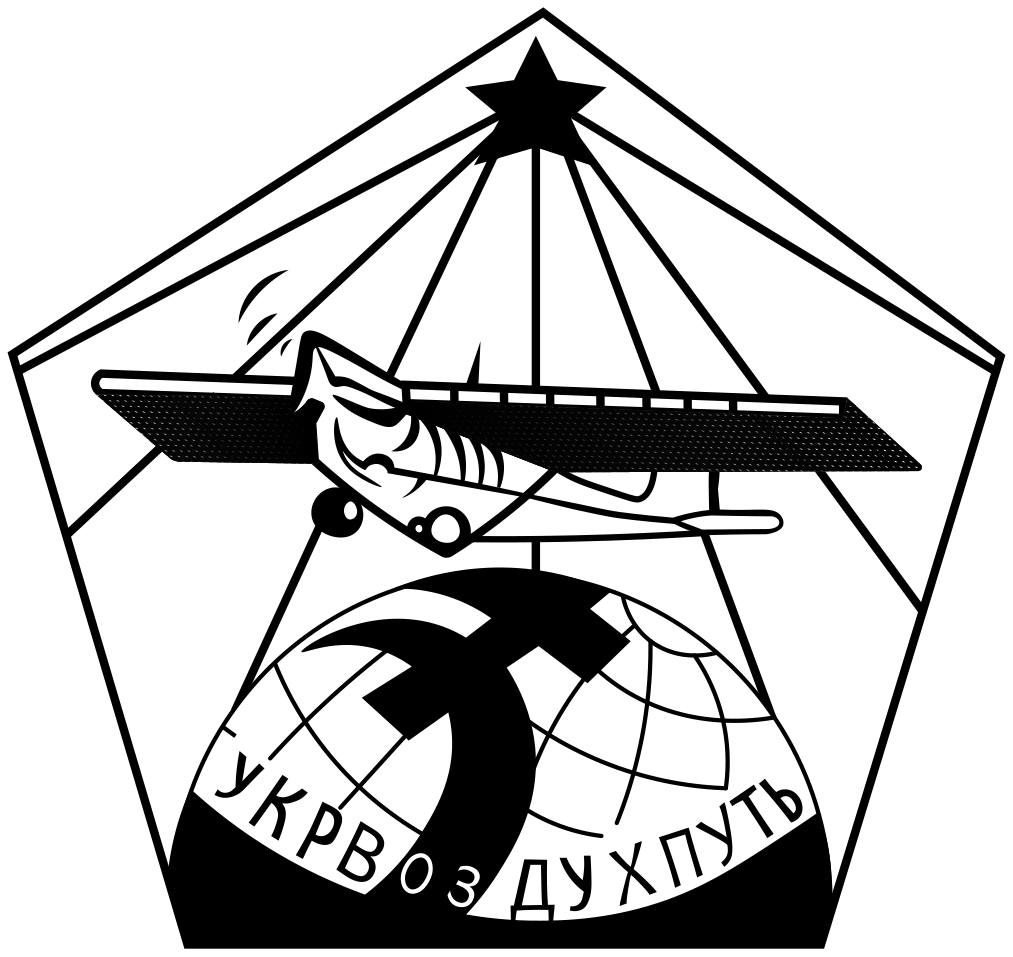
- Founded: 1 June 1923
- Ceased operations: 1929 (merged into Dobrolet)
- Hubs: Kharkiv Airport
- Destinations: Odesa, Kyiv, Moscow and Rostov-on-Don
- Headquarters: Kharkiv, Ukrainian SSR

Ukrpovitroshliakh (Ukrvozdukhput, Ukrainian Society of Airways, Ukrainian: Ukrains'kyi povitrianyi shliakh, lit. 'Ukrainian Air Way') was an airline based in Kharkiv, Ukrainian SSR during the interbellum. It operated scheduled domestic (USSR) services. It was the first civil aviation company of Ukraine.

== History ==
The airline was founded on 1 June 1923. Ukrpovitroshliakh began operating on 15 April 1925, offering service from Kharkiv to Odesa and Kyiv. From 15 June 1925, the company also offered flights to Moscow and Rostov-on-Don, completing its network centered in Kharkiv.

In 1926, Konstantin Kalinin became a Chief Designer.

By 1928, Ukrpovitroshliakh was carrying more than 3,000 passengers a year. But the Soviet central government's "Five-Year Plan" called for all air service in the Soviet Union to be controlled by one government agency. In 1929, Ukrpovitroshliakh was absorbed into the newly formed national airline Aeroflot along with the other Soviet operators -- Zakavia and Deruluft.

== Fleet ==
- Dornier Komet
- Kalinin K-4

== Accidents and incidents ==
On 12 September 1929, Dornier Merkur CCCP-211 crashed while returning to Sukhumi due to loss of control following engine problems, killing both pilots. The aircraft was being tested following repairs from a previous accident two months earlier at the same airport.

== Bibliography ==
- Cooksley, Peter (September–October 1996). "Celestial Coaches: Dornier's Record Breaking Komet and Merkur". Air Enthusiast (65): 20–24. ISSN 0143-5450.
