= List of Lockheed aircraft =

This is a list of aircraft produced or proposed by the Lockheed Aircraft Corporation from its founding as the Lockheed Aircraft Company in 1926 to its merging with Martin Marietta to form the Lockheed Martin Corporation in 1995.

Ordered by model number, Lockheed gave most of its aircraft astronomical names, from the first Vega to the C-5 Galaxy. Aircraft models listed in italics and with higher numbers – 780 following 80 and preceding 81, for example – are variants or developments of the base model.

Model	Name	First flight	Remarks
1	Vega	Jul 4, 1927	Six-passenger monoplane, original Vega model
2	Vega		Upgraded Vega with 300 hp (220 kW) Wright J-6 Whirlwind
3	Air Express	Apr 1928	Modified Vega for Western Air Express
4	Explorer	1928	Low-wing aircraft designed for trans-pacific flight between the United States and Japan
5	Vega	1929	Modified Vega with Wasp radial engine
6	Y1C-17		"Speed Vega" derivative modified by the United States Army Air Corps
7	Explorer Special		Modified Lockheed Explorer with wing dihedral
8	Sirius	1929	Single-engine, two-seat, long-range, high-performance aircraft
8A	Altair	Sep 1930	Modified Sirius with a retractable undercarriage
8D	Altair	1930	Upgraded Altair
9	Orion	Apr 1931	High speed wooden Six-passenger monoplane
10	Electra	Feb 23, 1934	Twin-engine all-metal transport
11	XFM-2		Proposed heavy fighter
12	Electra Junior	Jun 27, 1936	Six-passenger transport, scaled-down version of Model 10
212	L-212		Bomber trainer version
14	Super Electra	Jul 29, 1937	Passenger transport, scaled-up version of Model 10
15	PV-1 Ventura	Jul 31, 1941	Naval patrol bomber
16			Unbuilt derivative of Lockheed Model 10 Electra
18	Lodestar	Sep 21, 1939	Passenger transport (military version, C-60 cargo transport), stretched Model 14
19			Unbuilt fourteen-seat derivative of Model 14
20	XP-58 Chain Lightning	Jun 6, 1944	Long-range interceptor version of the P-38 Lightning
21	Ventura		Twin-engine World War II patrol bomber
22	P-38 Lightning	Jan 27, 1939	Twin-engine World War II fighter
122	P-38 Lightning	1941	YP-38 through P-38D
222	P-38 Lightning		P-38E through P-38H
322	P-322 Lightning		Export variant, impressed into U.S. service at war's outbreak
422	P-38 Lightning		P-38J through P-38M
522	XP-49	Nov 11, 1942	Advanced fighter prototype, based on P-38
622	XP-38A Lightning	Jun 6, 1944	Pressurized conversion of a P-38
822	P-38 Lightning		Navalized P-38 proposal
23	XP-49	Nov 11, 1942	Advanced P-38 derivative with pressurization and heavier weaponry
24			Proposed naval version of P-38 Lightning
26	P-2 Neptune	May 17, 1945	Patrol bomber and anti-submarine warfare aircraft
27			Proposed twin-engine canard transport
29			Proposed twin-engine bomber
30			Proposed twin-engine canard bomber
31			Proposed export version of Model 29
32			Proposed reconnaissance version of Model 18
33	Little Dipper	Aug 1944	Single seat light aircraft
34	Big Dipper	Dec 10, 1945	Twin seat light aircraft
35			Military trainer design derived from the North American NA-35
37	Ventura		Twin engine World War II patrol bomber
137	B-34		
437	B-37		
40	Model 40		Aerial target
41			Aerial target proposal
42			Aerial target proposal
44	Excalibur		Unbuilt four-engine predecessor to Constellation
45			Proposed radio control vehicle
49	Constellation	Jan 9, 1943	four-engine airliner
049	Constellation	Jan 9, 1943	Original passenger version
149	Constellation		Extra wing fuel tanks
249	XB-30		Redesignation of XB-30 (model 051); cancelled in favor of the B-29 and B-32
349	C-69 Constellation		Unbuilt C-69B long range troop/cargo transport
449	Constellation		Unknown airliner proposal
549	C-69 Constellation		C-69C VIP transport
649	Constellation	Oct 18, 1946	Improved passenger version
749	Constellation	Mar 14, 1947	Longer range version of model 649
849	Constellation		Unbuilt turbo-compound R-3350 powered version of model 749
949	Constellation		Unbuilt passenger/cargo convertible version of model 849
1049	Super Constellation	Oct 13, 1950	Improved Constellation
1149	Super Constellation		Unbuilt Allison turboprop powered version of the model 1049
1249	Super Constellation	Sep 1, 1954	Experimental turboprop military transport version
1449	Super Constellation		Proposed stretched turbine powered version of model 1049 with larger wings
1549	Super Constellation		Proposed further stretched version of model 1449
1649	Starliner	Oct 11, 1956	Final production version of the Constellation
50			Proposed single-engine liaison aircraft
51	XB-30		Proposed bomber version of Constellation, later redesignated model 249
52			Proposed single-seat fighter
60			Proposed twin-engine trainer
61			Proposed twin-engine trainer
62			Proposed twin-engine trainer
75	Saturn	Jun 17, 1947	Prototype small passenger airplane
80	P-80 Shooting Star	Jun 10, 1944	United States' first operational jet fighter
080	P-80 Shooting Star		YP-80A-P-80C
380	P-80 Shooting Star		Unbuilt naval proposal
480	P-80 Shooting Star		Unbuilt naval proposal
580	T-33 Shooting Star	Mar 22, 1948	Trainer; originally designated TP-80C and TF-80C
680	F-80D Shooting Star		Unbuilt version with engine upgrade
780	F-94 Starfire	Apr 16, 1949	All-weather jet fighter
880	F-94C Starfire		Redesigned tail & wing with rocket pods
980	YF-94D Starfire		Unbuilt ground attack version
1080	T2V-1 SeaStar	Dec 15, 1953	Naval trainer variant
81	XFV-1	Jun 16, 1954	Prototype tailsitter VTOL convoy protection fighter
82	C-130 Hercules	Aug 23, 1954	Four-engine medium transport
182	C-130 Hercules		All early models, including mission-specific variants
282	C-130 Hercules		C-130B and later, including variants
382	C-130 Hercules, L-100		Later models, including variants and -30 stretch
83	F-104 Starfighter	Feb 28, 1954	Supersonic Mach 2 interceptor
84	W2V-1		turboprop WV (EC-121 Warning Star) variant; contract cancelled
85	P-3 Orion	Apr 15, 1961	military patrol aircraft developed from the Electra (88/188)
520			Proposed P-3 AEW&C variant
87	AH-56A Cheyenne	Sep 21, 1967	Cancelled attack helicopter
88	L-188 Electra	Dec 6, 1957	Turboprop airliner
89	R6O/R6V Constitution	Nov 9, 1946	Large transport prototype
189			Civil version of Constitution
389			Unbuilt airliner version
489			Unbuilt airliner version
92			Proposed civil helicopter
93	L-1011 Tristar	Nov 16, 1970	Tri-engine, widebody airliner
99			Cancelled USAF interceptor
104	L-104		Temporary designation for redesigned Excalibur; later officially became Model 49
105	L-105		Temporary designation for Excalibur
129	Model X		1941 high-altitude bomber project competing for Type Specification XC-124 against B-27 and B-28
133	L-133		Cancelled jet fighter aircraft
136			Enlarged Constellation project, 1944; evolved into the Model 89/R6V
140	XP-80 Shooting Star	Jan 8, 1944	Experimental jet fighter
141	XP-80A Shooting Star		Experimental jet fighter
144			Enlarged variant of Excalibur
145			Commercial transport proposal (DC-3 replacement)
147			Small commercial transport proposals
151			Unbuilt airliner project
152			Medium-size turboprop/turbojet commercial aircraft proposals
153	XP-90/XF-90	Jun 3, 1949	Jet bomber escort prototype; cancelled in favor of the XF-88
155			Commercial jet-engined transport proposals
168			Heavy cargo/troop transport aircraft proposal
170			series of projects leading to TP-80/T-33A Shooting Star
171	X-7	Apr 26, 1951	Unmanned test bed for ramjet engines and missile guidance
182			Projected ASW version of Constitution
183			OS-113 interceptor fighter proposals; became XF3H-1
185			Commercial aircraft proposals (DC-3 replacement)
186			Jet-engined commercial transport proposals
187			OS-111 long-range carrier-based bomber proposal; became XA3D-1
188			Several projected modifications of the F-97 (later F-94C)
190			USAF interceptor proposals
191			Strategic turbojet bomber system
192			OS-117 ASW aircraft proposals; became XS2F-1
193	L-193 Constellation II		Jetliner/aerial tanker concept
195			Nuclear engine-powered aircraft proposals
197			ASW helicopter proposals
199	VG-Starfire		All-weather trainer project
200			Original proposal of XFV-1; later officially became Model 81
201			Commercial transport aircraft proposals (DC-3 replacement)
202			Day fighter proposals
203			VTOL liaison aircraft proposal
204			Several project variants of F-94C
206			pre-Hercules development of L-168 with removable cargo pod
207			Commercial transport proposal (DC-3 replacement)
208			AMC XC-Heavy Transport and Parasite/Missile carrier aircraft proposal
209			Parasite bomber proposal
210			Ground attack fighter proposals
212			Nuclear engine-powered aircraft proposals
227			Series of pre-Starfighter projects
242			Series of pre-Starfighter projects
245	L-245		Converted T-33 used by the company for development of the T2V-1 (model 1080)
246	XF-104	Mar 4, 1954	Interceptor prototype, led to the F-104
288	CL-288		F-104 based interceptor concept with wing mounted engines
295	CL-295		Design studies for a 'tail-sitting' VTOL fighter
300	C-141 Starlifter	Dec 17, 1963	Strategic airlifter
301	L-301		Proposed hypersonic research project; sometimes called X-24C
320	CL-320		Intermediate long-range high-speed interceptor project
325	CL-325		Reconnaissance aircraft project, predecessor to CL-400 Suntan design
329	JetStar	Sep 4, 1957	Business jet
1329	JetStar		Business jet
2329	JetStar II		Business jet
330			Projected T2V variant
330	XV-4/XV-10 Hummingbird	Jul 7, 1962	VTOL prototype
346	CL-346		Proposals for supersonic VTOL fighters, based on the F-104
351	U-2	Aug 4, 1955	CL-282, high-altitude spyplane
352	CL-352		Carrier-based interceptor
379	CL-379		Tilt-wing research aircraft project
400	CL-400 Suntan		Proposal for Mach 2.5 reconnaissance aircraft, liquid hydrogen fueled
400	L-400 Twin Hercules		Proposed twin-engine version of C-130
402	CL-402		Aermacchi AL-60 built under license
407	CL-407		Proposals for supersonic VTOL attack and reconnaissance aircraft
414	Hudson	Dec 10, 1938	Bomber and reconnaissance aircraft
475	CL-475		Prototype helicopter
500	C-5 Galaxy	Jun 30, 1968	Large jet transport
595	XH-51A	Sep 29, 1962	Attack helicopter prototype (Model 186)
645	F-22 Raptor	Sep 7, 1997	Air superiority stealth fighter
090P			Lockheed submission for the ATF (Advanced Tactical Fighter) Demonstration/Validation phase
1132	YF-22A Lightning II	Sep 29, 1990	Technology demonstrator (632 is the associated design iteration that evolved into EMD submission)
645	F-22A Raptor	Sep 7, 1997	EMD and operational production aircraft
760	CL-760		Lockheed proposal for the LARA (Light Armed Reconnaissance Aircraft), competition won by the OV-10 Bronco
823	CL-823		Designs for SST (Super Sonic Transport)
840	AH-56		Cancelled attack helicopter
901	CL-901	Sep 1966	Converted F-104 for advanced air superiority
934	CL-934		Interceptor variant of the F-104
977-16	CL-977-16		Composite helicopter
981	CL-981		Enlarged variant of the F-104, developed into the CL-1200
984	CL-984		Strike variant of the F-104
985	CL-985B		development of the CL-984 for Belgium
995	S-3A Viking	Jan 21, 1972	Twin-engine naval ASW aircraft
1026	CL-1026		designs for a commercial helicopter, using the rigid-rotor system from the Cheyenne.
1195	CL-1195		designs for fighter, proposal for the "Free World Fighter" program circa 1969
1200	CL-1200 Lancer		development of the F-104. became CL-1600 / X-27
1201	Lockheed CL-1201		Design study for 6,000 ton nuclear powered transport
1800	CL-1800		helicopter project
2000	L-2000		Proposed supersonic transport (SST)
2016	CL-2016		Submission for the Advanced Tactical Fighter initial request for information
	XFM-2	1930s	heavy fighter, bomber destroyer, cancelled
	YP-24	1931	fighter, ground-attack aircraft
	XC-35	May 9, 1935	experimental aircraft
	X-27 Lancer		CL-1600, cancelled replacement of F-104 Starfighter; never flown
	TR-1/U-2R	Aug 1, 1981	advanced U-2
	ER-2/U-2ER		NASA U-2
	A-12	Apr 26, 1962	CIA supersonic spyplane
	YF-12 Blackbird	Aug 7, 1963	supersonic interceptor prototype
	SR-71 Blackbird	Dec 22, 1964	USAF supersonic spyplane
	YO-3A Quiet Star	1966	Reconnaissance
	LASA-60	Sep 15, 1959	Light Utility Sport Aircraft
	X-26B		
	Have Blue (XST)	Dec 1977	stealth technology testbed
	F-117 Nighthawk	Jun 18, 1981	stealth attack aircraft
	Flatbed	1980s	military transport aircraft project, cancelled
	P-7	1980s	maritime-patrol aircraft project, cancelled

== Unmanned Aerial Vehicles ==
- Lockheed Aequare
- Lockheed AQM-60 Kingfisher
- Lockheed MQM-105 Aquila
- Lockheed D-21
- Lockheed X-7

== See also ==
- Vega Aircraft Corporation
- Lockheed Constellation variants

== Sources ==
- Breffort, Dominique. Lockheed Constellation: from Excalibur to Starliner Civilian and Military Variants. Paris: Histoire and Collecions, 2006. Print. ISBN 2-915239-62-2
- US Warplanes – C-69/C-121 Retrieved 10/9/11
- US Warplanes – P-38 Retrieved 10/9/11
- US Warplanes – Shooting Star Series
- Boyne, Walter J, Beyond the Horizons: The Lockheed Story. St. Martin's Press: New York, 1998.
- Lockheed-Martin products
- Pace, Steve, Lockheed Skunk Works. Motorbooks International: Osceola, WI, 1992.
- Royal Air Force Museum Aircraft Thesaurus
- Yenne, Bill, Lockheed. Crescent Books, 1987.
- Lockheed – Manufacturers, Builders and Designers – 1000 Aircraft Photos.com
