= Lockheed Orion =

Lockheed Orion or Lockheed Martin Orion may refer to:

- Lockheed Model 9 Orion (1931), a single engine airliner
- Lockheed P-3 Orion (1959), a maritime patrol aircraft, with several variants
- Orion (spacecraft), a crewed spacecraft in NASA's Artemis program, co-developed by Lockheed Martin
