= Bowen Air Lines =

US airline

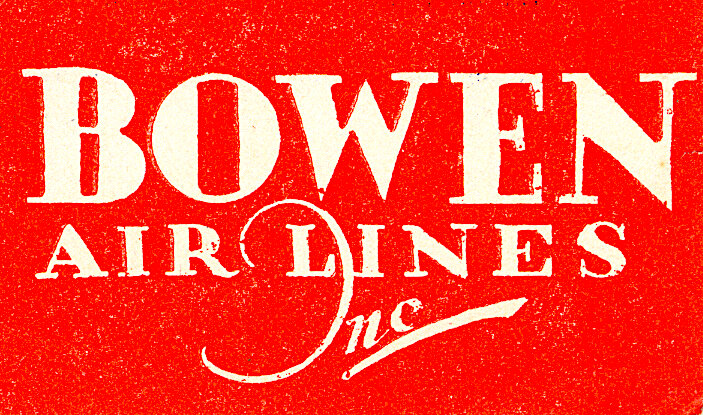

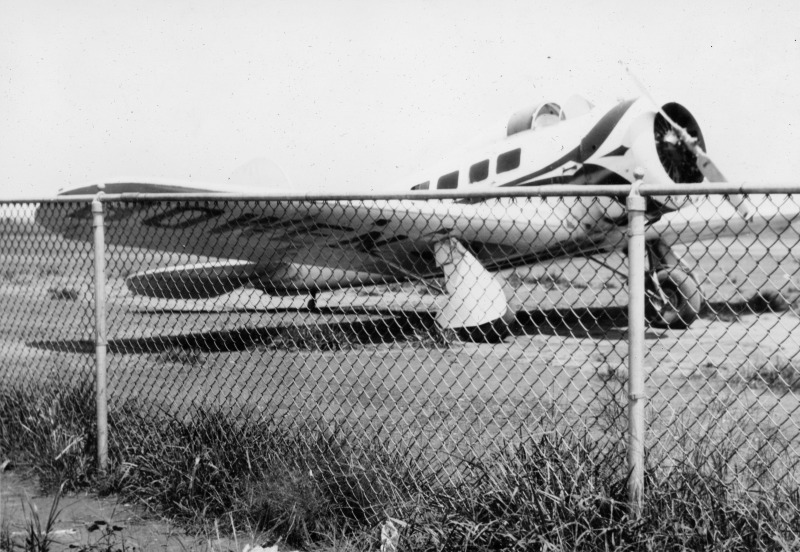
- Founded: 1 October 1930; 95 years ago
- Commenced operations: 1 October 1930; 95 years ago
- Ceased operations: 15 February 1936; 90 years ago

Bowen Air Lines was an airline that operated from 1 September 1930 until 15 February 1936. Founded in Fort Worth, Texas, by Temple Bowen, it flew passengers and express packages to select destinations between Chicago, Illinois, and Brownsville, Texas. Starting initially with a fleet of five Lockheed Vega aircraft, the airline additionally acquired a Lockheed Sirius, two Lockheed Model 9 Orion aircraft (including the prototype), and two Vultee V-1 aircraft. Despite having flown over 4,000,000 miles and having carried 45,000 passengers, the company ceased operations on 15 February 1936 due to its inability to procure an airmail contract from the United States Post Office Department. With the exception of the Vultee aircraft that were sold to American Airlines, the rest of the company's assets were purchased by Braniff Airways.
