= FM2 =

FM2 may refer to:

- Socket FM2, an APU socket for AMD processors
- Nikon FM2, an SLR camera
- FM-2 Wildcat, a fighter aircraft
- Lockheed XFM-2, a fighter aircraft
- FM2, an album by Foster & McElroy
- Farm to Market Road 2, a state-maintained highway in the U.S. state of Texas
- FM2 (radio station), a radio station in the Philippines
- Front Mission 2, a tactical role-playing game
- Forza Motorsport 2, a racing video game
