= Lockheed Explorer =

Series of pioneering aircraft

Explorer
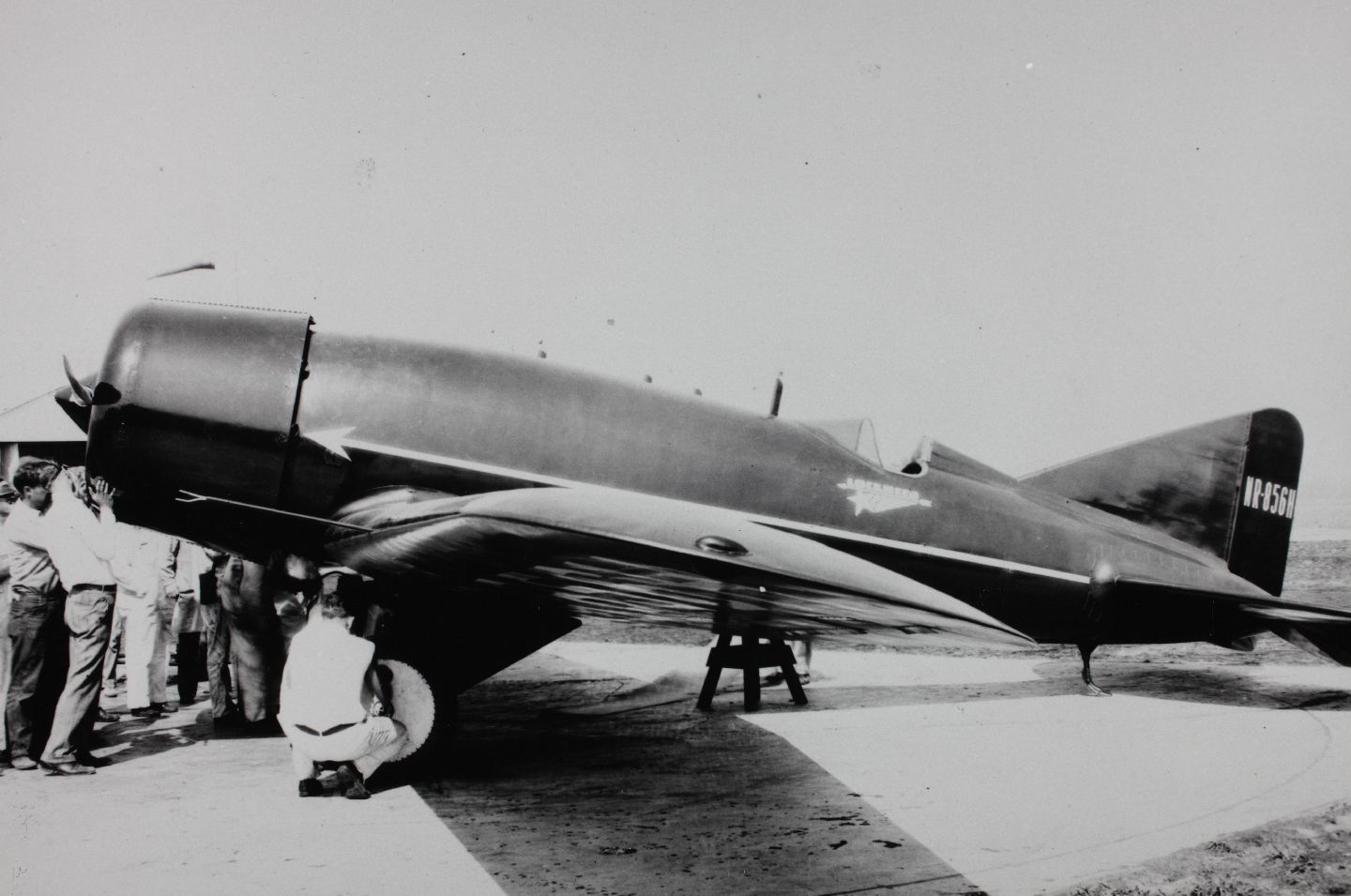

General information
- Type: Exploration
- National origin: United States of America
- Manufacturer: Lockheed
- Number built: 4

History
- Developed from: Lockheed Vega

The Lockheed Explorer was the least successful wooden airplane design produced by the Lockheed Aircraft Company. The Vega fuselage was combined with a cantilevered low wing. Seating for a single pilot was provided in an open cockpit behind the wings.

== Design and development ==
Work on the Explorer was commenced in 1927 for Sir Hubert Wilkins as an aircraft for use in exploration of Antarctica. However, this configuration was judged impractical, and Wilkins opted to use a Vega equipped with floats instead. The incomplete aircraft was brought out of storage to make an attempt at a nonstop flight between Japan and the United States, funded by lumber dealer John Buffelen and members of the Tacoma Chamber of Commerce. Named City of Tacoma, the first Pacific crossing attempt ended in disaster when overfilled fuel tanks spilled over on takeoff. Two subsequent attempts in newer Explorers also met with failure.

The wing of a wrecked Explorer was fitted to the fuselage of an Orion by aviator Wiley Post, resulting in an Orion-Explorer hybrid variously referred to as 'Wiley's Bastard' and 'Aurora', though Post himself referred to the aircraft only by its serial number. The aircraft, nose-heavy, crashed after its engine failed shortly after takeoff near Point Barrow, Alaska on August 15, 1935, taking the lives of Post and humorist Will Rogers.

Lockheed built a total of four Explorers, all of which were destroyed in crashes.

== Variants ==
4 Explorer
Single-seat single-engined aircraft, powered by a 450-hp (336-kW) Pratt & Whitney Wasp radial piston engine. Built for a non-stop trans-Pacific flight between Japan and the united States; two built.
7 Explorer
Improved version of the 4 Explorer, powered by a Pratt & Whitney Wasp C radial piston engine; two built.

== Specifications (Explorer 4) ==
Data from Lockheed Aircraft since 1913

General characteristics

- Crew: 1
- Length: 27 ft 6 in (8.38 m)
- Wingspan: 48 ft 6 in (14.78 m)
- Height: 8 ft 2 in (2.49 m)
- Wing area: 313 sq ft (29.08 m^{2})
- Empty weight: 3,075 lb (1,395 kg)
- Gross weight: 9,008 lb (4,086 kg)
- Powerplant: 1 × Pratt & Whitney Wasp , 450 hp (336 kW)

Performance

- Maximum speed: 165 mph (265 km/h, 143 kn)
- Range: 5,500 mi (8,850 km, 4,800 nmi)
- Rate of climb: 1,200 ft/min (6.1 m/s)
- Wing loading: 28.8 lb/sq ft (140.5 kg/m^{2})

== See also ==
Related development

- Lockheed Vega
- Lockheed Air Express
- Lockheed Sirius
- Lockheed Altair
- Lockheed Orion

Related lists

- List of Lockheed aircraft
