= Laura Ingalls (aviator) =

American aviator and Nazi agent (1893–1967)

Laura Houghtaling Ingalls
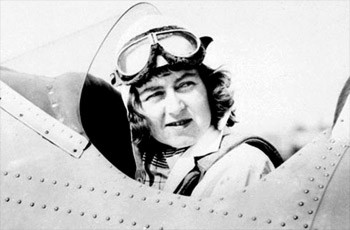
- Born: December 14, 1893; Brooklyn, New York, U.S.
- Died: January 10, 1967 (aged 73); Burbank, California, U.S.
- Known for: Harmon Trophy; Nazi sympathizer
- Parent(s): Francis Abbott Ingalls I Martha Houghtaling
- Relatives: Francis Abbott Ingalls II

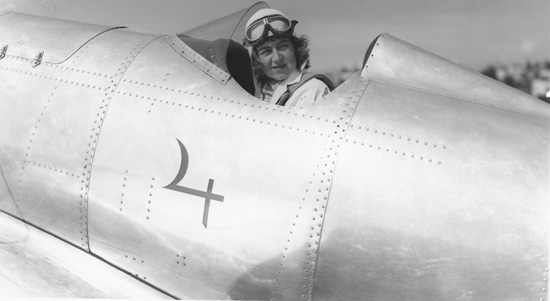

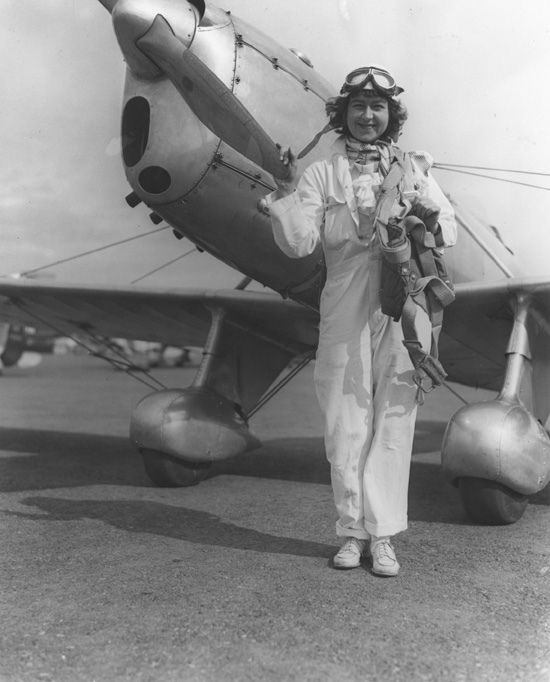

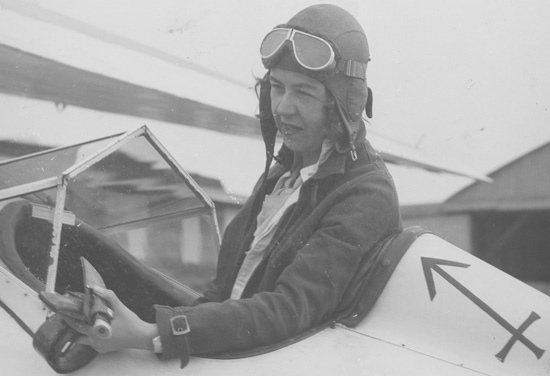

Laura Houghtaling Ingalls (December 14, 1893 – January 10, 1967) was an American pilot who won the Harmon Trophy.

She was arrested in December 1941 and convicted of failing to register as a paid Nazi agent, and served 20 months in prison. The Nazis had encouraged her to speak at events of the America First Committee.

== Early life ==
Ingalls was born in Brooklyn, New York, on December 14, 1893, to Francis Abbott Ingalls I and Martha Houghtaling. Martha was the daughter of David Harrison Houghtaling of Kingston, New York, who was a descendant of Jan Willemsen Hoogteling, who arrived in New Amsterdam on May 9, 1661. Laura wrote of her mother:

My mother, partly through ill health, was extremely emotional and without adequate self-discipline; spoiled by her parents who thought she was wonderful and could do anything. Brilliant along certain lines, she possessed the trait I find most exciting in the American character, viz. the ability to hurdle difficulties and achieve the reputedly impossible. I grew up under such influence.

She attended private schools in New York, and also studied in Vienna and Paris. She studied nursing at the Presbyterian Hospital Training School in New York. Quitting nursing, she danced in ballet and vaudeville.

== Personal life ==
Laura Houghtaling Ingalls was a distant cousin of Little House on the Prairie's Laura Ingalls Wilder, and became a friend of her daughter Rose Wilder Lane.

== Aviation ==
She learned to fly in 1928 at Roosevelt Field near Mineola, New York, and then continued at Parks Air College in St. Louis. By 1930 she was setting records in acrobatic flying.

Her best-known flights were made in 1934 and earned her a Harmon Trophy. Ingalls flew in a Lockheed Air Express from Mexico to Chile, over the Andes Mountains to Rio de Janeiro, to Cuba and then to Floyd Bennett Field in New York, marking the first flight over the Andes by an American woman, the first solo flight around South America in a landplane, the first flight by a woman from North America to South America, and setting a woman's distance record of 17,000 miles.

=== Aviation records ===
- Longest solo flight by a woman (17,000 miles)
- First solo flight by a woman from North to South America
- First solo flight around South America by man or woman
- First complete flight by a land plane around South America by a man or woman
- First American woman to fly the Andes solo

== Activities as a Nazi agent ==
In late September 1939, Ingalls flew over Washington, D.C., in her Lockheed Orion monoplane, dropping anti-intervention pamphlets. She was arrested for violating White House airspace, but was released within hours. Following the defeat of France in 1940, she approached Baron (Freiherr) Ulrich von Gienanth, the head of the Gestapo in the US, and, officially, second secretary of the German Embassy. She suggested that she make a solo flight to Europe, where she would continue her campaign to promote the Nazi cause. Von Gienanth told her to stay in America to work with the America First Committee.

Ingalls gave speeches for the Committee in which she derided America's "lousy democracy" and gave Nazi salutes. Von Gienanth praised her oratorical skills. She had made a careful study of Mein Kampf, on which she based many of her speeches, as well as pamphlets by Hitler such as My New Order and Germany and the Jewish Question, and Elizabeth Dilling's books The Roosevelt Red Record and The Octopus. She expected Hitler to win the war; in April 1941, she wrote to a German official, "Some day I will shout my triumph to a great leader and a great people... Heil Hitler!" After the German declaration of war on December 11, 1941, she went straight to Washington to receive a list of contacts from von Gienanth, and was arrested a week later.

Ingalls was charged with failing to register with the government as a paid Nazi agent, in violation of the Foreign Agents Registration Act of 1938. She had been receiving approximately $300 a month from von Gienanth. During the trial it came out that von Gienanth had encouraged Ingalls's participation in the America First Committee, a significant embarrassment for that organization.

The FBI testified that they had kept her under surveillance for several months. Ingalls was convicted, and sentenced to eight months to two years in prison on February 20, 1942. She was transferred from the District of Columbia jail to the U.S. federal women's prison in Alderson, West Virginia, on July 14, 1943, after fighting with another inmate. She was released from prison on October 5, 1943, after serving 20 months.

Prison had not altered her views, however. A few months after her release, she stated her opinion of the Normandy landings:

This whole invasion is a power lust, blood drunk orgy in a war which is unholy and for which the U.S. will be called to terrible accounting... They [the Nazis] fight the common enemy. They fight for independence of Europe—independence from the Jews. Bravo!

After her probation ended, in July 1944 Ingalls was arrested at the Mexican border. Her suitcase contained seditious materials, including notes she had made of Japanese and German short-wave radio broadcasts. She was prevented from entering Mexico, but was not prosecuted. Ingalls applied for a presidential pardon in 1950, but her application for clemency was rejected by two successive Pardon Attorneys. On the latter occasion, the reply stated that Ingalls had been of "special value of the Nazi propaganda machine".

She died on January 10, 1967, in Burbank, California, aged 73.
