= Lockheed CL-1200 Lancer =

American fighter proposal

CL-1200 Lancer / X-27
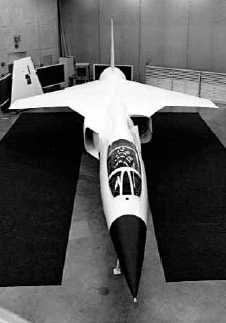
- X-27 mock-up in a Lockheed Corporation hangar

General information
- Type: Interceptor
- National origin: United States
- Manufacturer: Lockheed Corporation
- Status: Cancelled at mock-up stage

History
- Developed from: Lockheed F-104 Starfighter

The Lockheed CL-1200 Lancer was a late 1960s company-funded proposal for a fighter aircraft based on the Lockheed F-104 Starfighter. The CL-1200 was conceived and marketed mainly for and to non-US military services, as an export product. As such it would have competed with combat-proven designs like the Dassault Mirage III, McDonnell Douglas F-4 Phantom II, Mikoyan-Gurevich MiG-21, and Northrop F-5E Tiger II. The CL-1200 competed unsuccessfully against proposed fourth generation designs, under the US government's Lightweight Fighter program, which would eventually result in the General Dynamics F-16 and Northrop F-17 Cobra (precursor of the McDonnell Douglas F/A-18).

Lockheed sought to capitalize on its F-104 production experience, and commonality of parts and systems. It could minimize expenses by reusing tooling, jigs and existing facilities. Lockheed was also experienced in consortium production and further hoped to continue this arrangement with the CL-1200. It was projected that CL-1200 deliveries could begin in 1972.

Borrowing heavily from the F-104 design the new type featured a new high-mounted, increased span wing and low-mounted, enlarged tailplanes. Both features were to improve flight handling characteristics and short-field performance. The CL1200-1 would use an uprated version of the F-104 engine, the General Electric J79 with a later variant known as the CL1200-2 to be powered by a Pratt & Whitney TF30 turbofan.

The CL-1200-1 was entered in the International Fighter Aircraft competition. Since the Northrop F-5 was named the winner in November 1970, the primary market for the Lancer was lost, and the project was terminated with no aircraft completed.

The X-27 was an experimental designation assigned by the USAF to a proposed high-performance research aircraft derived from the CL-1200 Lancer project. The X-27 was to have tested advanced technology high-performance engines and equipment. Again, the X-27 project did not proceed beyond the mock-up stage.

The CL-1200-2 (sometimes referred to as the CL-1600) was a proposed development of the X-27 for entry into the Lightweight Fighter Competition in 1972. The CL-1200-2 was not proceeded with when General Dynamics and Northrop designs were given contracts for the YF-16 and YF-17. The design was similar to the X-27 but had round intakes with shock cones and a different fin.

A further variant proposed for the United States Navy was designated the CL-1400 or CL-1400N. It was based on the forward fuselage, intake and wing of the CL-1200-2 with the rear fuselage of the X-27.

== Design ==
Intended as a successor to the F-104, the Lancer was another product from Lockheed's Skunk Works. Clarence L "Kelly" Johnson headed the department during this period, while Skunk Works designers carried out all aerodynamic studies and wind tunnel testing on the type.

=== Airframe ===
The CL-1200 would use the basic F-104 fuselage structure, increased in length to provide 46% extra internal fuel capacity. The fuselage extension consisted of a 30 in (76 cm) plug between the standard F-104 front and center fuselage sections. Unlike the F-104, the rear fuselage section was to be constructed using titanium alloy for the frames, longerons and skinning around the jet exhaust. The major revision of the design was a shoulder-mounted wing of 53% larger area which was also moved further aft. The new wing had a span of 29 ft (8.8 m) and still featured leading and trailing edge flaps but gained new leading edge extensions, while the 10° anhedral of the Starfighter was retained. The flap system was designed to be either manual or automatic in operation. The system configured them as required for load factor, airspeed and altitude. The new inner wing panels featured an additional trailing edge flap which doubled the area in comparison to the F-104. This would have improved short-field performance and reduced landing speed. The boundary layer control system of the F-104 was deemed unnecessary due to the increased flap area, and was omitted. The outer wing panels were virtually identical to those of the F-104.

The tailplane was increased in area, split into two separate surfaces, and moved from atop the vertical fin to the lower rear fuselage to avoid the downwash effects from the high-set wing at high angles of attack which could have resulted in a deep stall condition. The repositioning of the tailplane was also a measure to eliminate the Starfighter's known pitch-up problems. For commonality the landing gear, hydraulic and electrical systems remained essentially identical to the F-104. The strengthened windshield from the F-104S was to be used to withstand the aerodynamic heating of flight at higher Mach numbers. A two-seat trainer version was planned, as was a reconnaissance and all-weather interceptor version. This would have been achieved by using the existing forward fuselage sections and avionics from the TF-104G, RF-104G and F-104S.

=== Powerplant ===
The initial variant of the Lancer was to be the CL-1200-1, powered by a single J79-GE-19 turbojet which was an uprated version of the engine used in the F-104. The second, more advanced variant, the CL-1200-2, was to have redesigned center and rear fuselage sections that could accommodate a modern turbofan engine as an improvement on the J79 turbojet. This turbofan engine was to be the Pratt & Whitney TF30-P-100 as used in the F-111F. The TF-30-P-100 would have provided a 60 percent increase in thrust at maximum power. The air intakes were located in the same position as on the F-104, but they were to employ variable shock cones with four-inch movement in place of the F-104's fixed cones to optimize engine performance over a wide speed range.

=== Armament ===
The Lancer was intended to retain the 20 mm General Electric M61A1 cannon as its primary armament, although a 30 mm DEFA gun could be fitted as an alternative. For the ground-attack role nine weapons stations were provided: one under the fuselage, three under each wing, and one at each wingtip. Two Nord Aviation AS-30 missiles could be carried on the inner underwing pylons, while up to 12,000 lb (5,450 kg) of ordnance could be carried on short-range ground-attack missions. Air-to-air missiles designed to be carried were AIM-7 Sparrow (maximum of four) and AIM-9 Sidewinder (typically, six to be carried with a maximum of 10 possible). External fuel tanks of the same type and capacity as the F-104 could be carried on the wing tips and on underwing pylons to increase ferry range.

=== Performance ===
The estimated gross weight was 35,000 lb (16,000 kg) with maximum external load, and a top speed of 1,700 mph (2,720 km/h, Mach 2.5) at 35,000 ft (10,700 m) was envisaged. The takeoff run was estimated to be 1,450 ft (440 m) in the intercept configuration; only 52% of that required for the F-104G with a similar improvement on landing performance due to the slower approach speed. Lockheed's chief designer "Kelly" Johnson projected that the CL-1200-2 would be superior in air-to-air combat to any known fighter.

=== Cost ===
Lockheed carried out a comprehensive survey and believed that there was a worldwide market for an advanced design, low-price fighter aircraft over the decade of the 1970s. Other aircraft manufacturers also recognized the opportunity and this was the reason for the fierce competition for sales at the time. Lockheed calculations showed that even a 10% share of this market (750 aircraft) would be a worthwhile venture. They further reasoned that development costs for the Lancer would be approximately 70.5 million US Dollars (1970). Unit costs depended on the size of the production run with $2.7 million being quoted in the case of a production run of 500 aircraft and $2.4 million for twice this number.

Lockheed researched operating costs for the first 10 years of operation. This included the provision of spares, ground equipment, technical manuals, and both maintenance and flight training. For a production run of 500 aircraft, the support cost over 10 years was given as $330 million, reducing to $180 million if 1,000 Lancers were built.

Operating costs over 10 years were also calculated. By adding the total of all these costs Lockheed claimed that their product offered significant savings over both the Dassault Mirage F-1 and the F-4F Phantom when their equivalent costs were shown.

== Project cancellations ==
=== CL-1200-1 ===
In November 1970 the Northrop F-5-21 was named the winner of the International Fighter Aircraft competition. After that, no interest was shown in the CL-1200 by existing F-104 operators and the project was terminated.

=== CL-704 VTOL ===
Another cancelled Starfighter derivative, pre-dating the CL-1200 Lancer by eight years and not directly related, was the CL-704 VTOL strike and reconnaissance aircraft originally proposed in 1962 as a joint venture between Lockheed and Short Brothers and Harland Ltd. Designed purely for VTOL operations, it would have seven vertically mounted Rolls-Royce RB181 lift engines in each of the enlarged wingtip pods. The main forward propulsion was provided by a Rolls-Royce RB.168R mounted in the fuselage. The project was cancelled due to the numerous complexities involved and the highly advanced development of the Hawker P.1127.

A larger-winged F-104 variant was proposed as an alternative to the MRCA (Multi-Role Combat Aircraft) then being designed as a multi-national European project. Nothing ever emerged, and the MRCA eventually became the Panavia Tornado.

== X-27 development ==
The USAF planned to buy at least one experimental Lancer under the designation X-27 (called the CL-1600 by Lockheed) for Mach 2.6 testing. The X-27 was to be similar in overall configuration to the Lancer, but was to feature modified engine air intakes of rectangular form. The X-27 program received almost no U.S. Congressional or Air Force support. Due to the lack of funding, no flight-capable aircraft were built. One full-scale mockup was built, and up to three fuselages had been converted before project termination.

== Specifications (CL-1200-2 / X-27) ==
Data from NB: These are estimated figures given by Lockheed as neither type flew.

General characteristics

- Crew: One
- Length: 57 ft 3 in or 53 ft 2 in (17.45 or 16.2 m)
- Wingspan: 29 ft 2 in or 28 ft 7 in (8.89 or 8.7 m)
- Height: 17 ft 2 in or 16 ft 1 in (5.23 or 4.9 m)
- Wing area: 300 sq ft (28 m^{2})
- Airfoil: Bi-convex
- Empty weight: 17,885 or 17,250 lb (8,112 or 7,800 kg)
- Gross weight: 24,385 or 32,500 lb (11,061 or 14,700 kg)
- Max takeoff weight: 35,000 lb (15,900 kg)
- Powerplant: 1 × Pratt & Whitney TF30-P-100 turbofan, 15,000 lbf (67 kN) thrust dry, 25,000 lbf (110 kN) with afterburner

Performance

- Maximum speed: 1,477 or 1,260 kn (1,690 or 1,450 mph, 2,720 or 2,330 km/h) at 35,000 ft (11,000 m)
- Maximum speed: Mach 2.57 or 2.19
- Range: 1,800 nmi (2,100 mi, 3,400 km)
- Combat range: 367 nmi (422 mi, 680 km) with 4,000 lb (1,814 kg) bombload
- Service ceiling: 60,000 ft (18,000 m)
- Rate of climb: 60,000 ft/min (300 m/s)
- Takeoff run: 1,450 ft (440 m)
- Landing run: 2,060 ft (930 m)

Armament
CL-1200-2 only:

- 1 × 20 mm General Electric M61 Vulcan cannon with 725 rounds, or
- 1 × 30 mm DEFA cannon with 400 rounds
- Up to 12,000 pounds (5,400 kg) ordnance

== See also ==
Related development

- Lockheed F-104 Starfighter

Aircraft of comparable role, configuration, and era

- Dassault Mirage F1

Related lists

- List of experimental aircraft
- List of Lockheed aircraft
