= Lockheed Model 9 Orion =

1931 transport aircraft family

Model 9 Orion
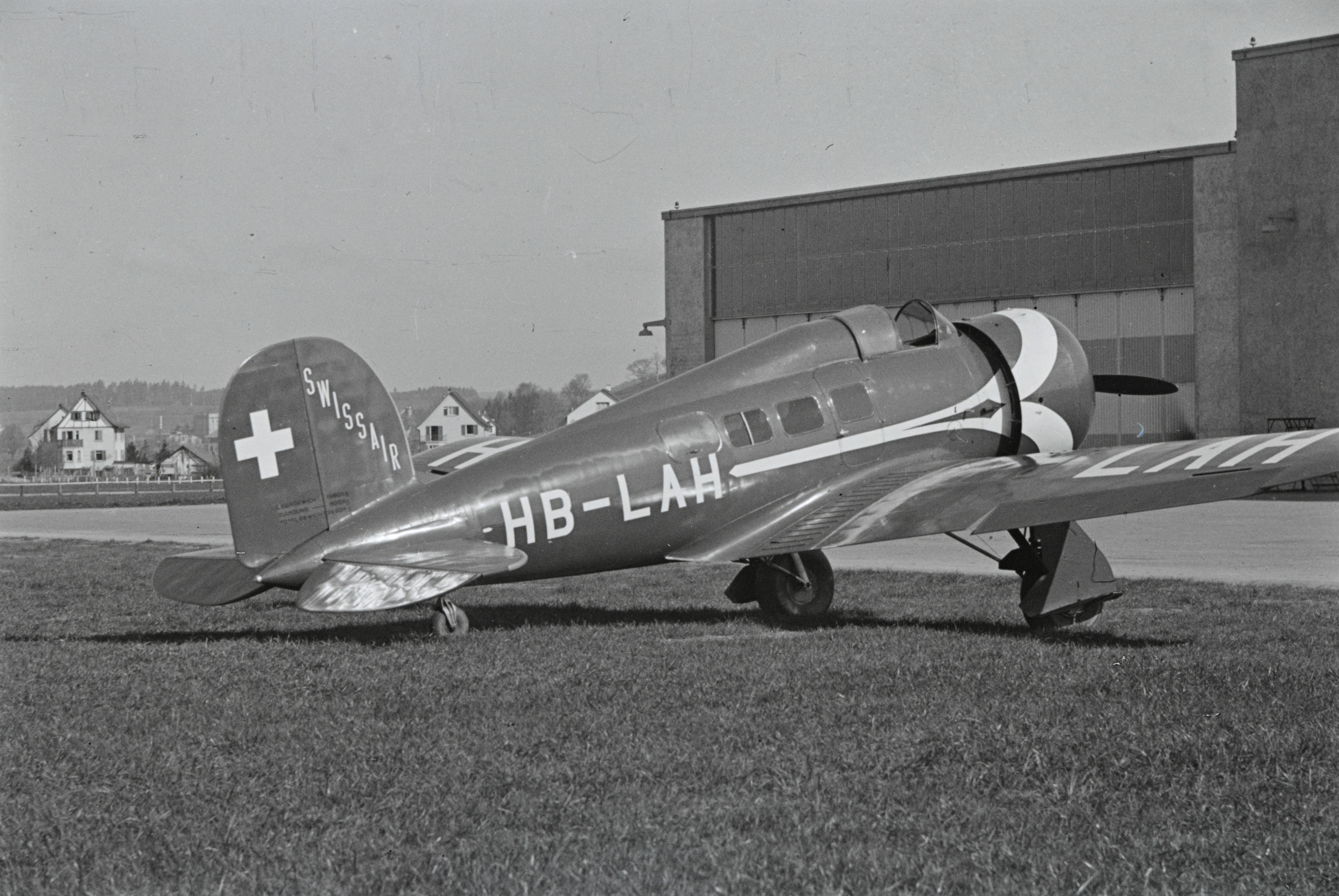
- Swissair Orion Model 9B HB-LAH

General information
- Type: Airliner
- National origin: US
- Manufacturer: Lockheed Aircraft Limited
- Designer: Richard A. von Hake
- Number built: 36

History
- Introduction date: 1931
- First flight: 1931
- Developed from: Lockheed Altair

The Lockheed Model 9 Orion is a single-engined passenger aircraft built in 1931 for commercial airlines. It was faster than any American military aircraft of that time. Designed by Richard A. von Hake, it was the last wood aircraft produced by the Lockheed Aircraft Corporation.

== Design ==
The Orion was the last design using many identical elements from the Lockheed designs preceding it. It primarily used all the elements of the Altair, but included a forward top cockpit similar to the Vega, plus the NACA cowling introduced in the Air Express. Lockheed used the same basic fuselage mold and wing for all these wooden designs (the Explorer wing was unique), hence the close similarities between them. The Orion featured an enclosed cabin with seating for six passengers. The Orion received its Approved Type Certificate on 6 May 1931.

Gerard F. Vultee was Lockheed's chief engineer in 1928 through 1931 and was involved in the designs of all the Lockheed variants of that time and specifically designed Charles Lindbergh's Sirius.

== Operational history ==
Although designed with the passenger market in mind, its speed made it a natural for air races. The first Bendix race of 1931 had a showing of two Orions, three Altairs and one Vega in a race that had only nine aircraft competing. On 11 July 1935, Laura H. Ingalls flew a Lockheed Orion, powered by a Pratt & Whitney Wasp engine, from Floyd Bennett Field to Burbank, California, establishing an East-West record for women. Two months later she flew it back to set a West-East record.

The first Orion entered service with Bowen Air Lines at Fort Worth, Texas, in May 1931. Northwest Airways, later renamed to Northwest Airlines, operated it from 1933 to 1935. American Airways, later renamed as American Airlines in 1934, operated several 9D Orions. Many safe miles were flown in airline service and the headlines for speed records proved the advanced design and reliability. Airline use as a passenger transport was curtailed, however. In 1934, the Civil Aeronautics Authority restricted use of single-engine aircraft from scheduled commercial passenger flights when flown in instrument flight conditions or over terrain that precluded safe emergency landings. It also became mandatory to have a copilot on aircraft fitted with both retractable undercarriage and flaps (which were fitted to some Orions) which therefore needed a larger two-seat cockpit. The requirements brought an end to the Orion as a passenger-carrying airliner in the US.

The crash of a wooden-winged Fokker F.10 in 1931 due to rot in the wooden wing structure also resulted in additional and onerous inspections that pushed the industry toward all metal designs, and led to the construction of one all-metal Orion, converted from a DL-2A Altair.

They were then used for mail or general cargo or sold for private use and charter. At least 12 used "Orions" were purchased for service in the Spanish Civil War and destroyed in use.

In 1935, a single Model 9 Orion was modified by Lockheed as a news camera plane for the Detroit News. A pod was built into the front leading edge of the right wing about eight feet out from the fuselage and mounted a camera behind a glass dome. To aim the camera the pilot was provided with a primitive grid gunsight on the windshield.

The Orion Explorer was a modified 9E. It had a damaged wing replaced with the wing of the Explorer 7 after a crash, and was fitted with a 600 hp (450 kW) Pratt & Whitney Wasp S3H1 engine. Fixed landing gear and later floats were also fitted. It was used by Wiley Post and Will Rogers for a round-the-world flight attempt, but both men died when the aircraft crashed in Alaska on 15 August 1935.

== Variants ==
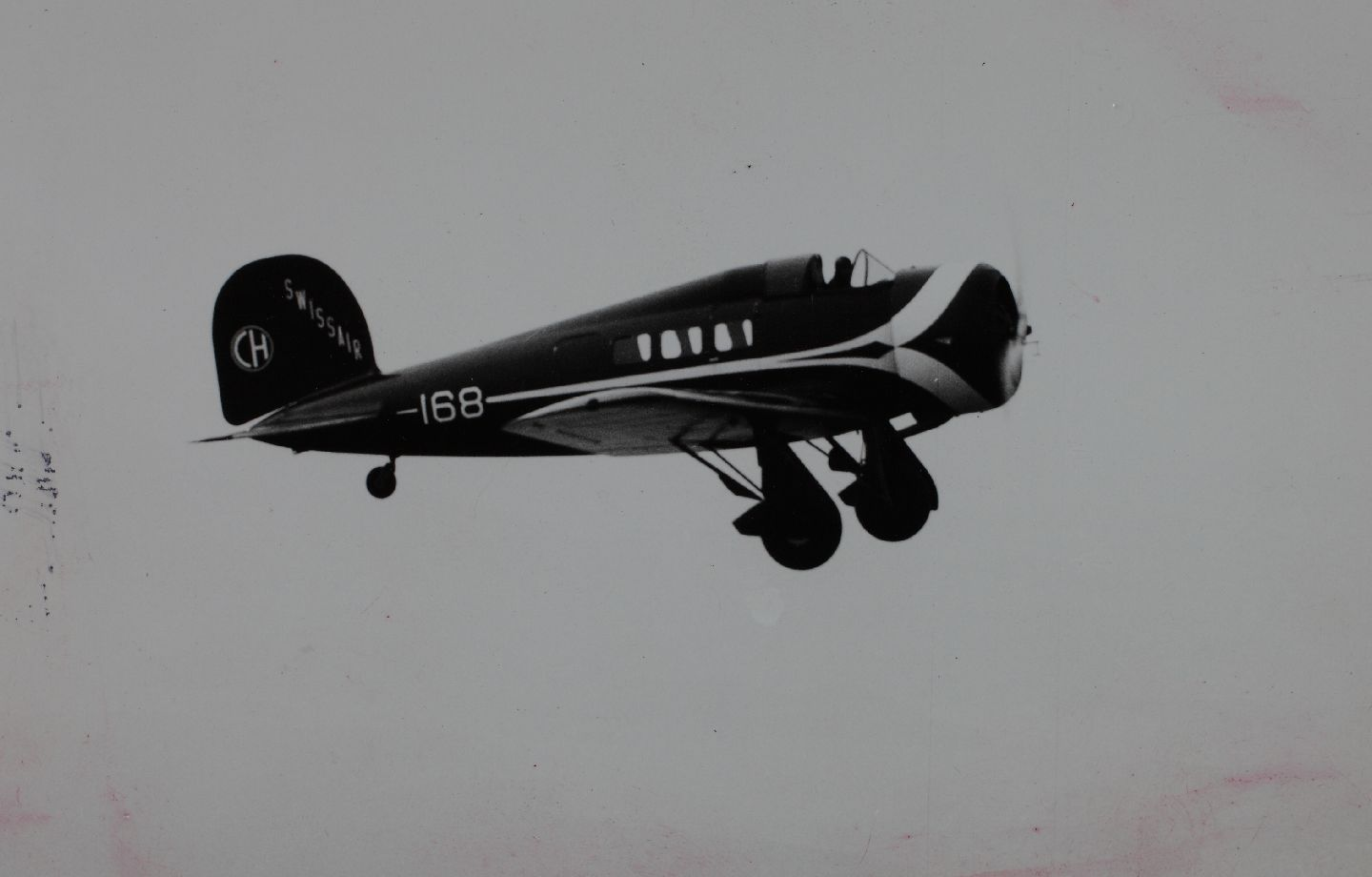
A Swissair Orion undergoes flight tests

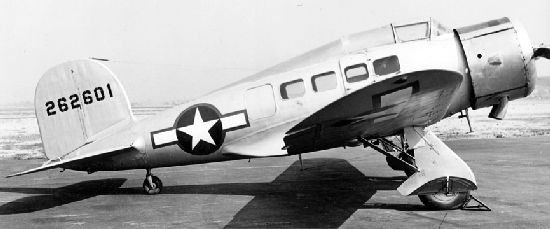
UC-85 in 1943

Orion 9
14 built, 410 hp (310 kW) Pratt & Whitney Wasp A or 420 hp (310 kW) Pratt & Whitney Wasp C
Orion 9A Special
one aircraft built for Hal Roach Studios with 450 hp (340 kW) Pratt & Whitney Wasp SC engine
Orion 9B
two aircraft supplied to Swissair, 575 hp (429 kW) Wright R-1820-E engine
Orion 9C
redesignated Altair DL-2A for Shell Oil, named Shelllightning. (See Surviving Aircraft)
Orion 9D
11 built, 6 originally for American Airways, 3 for Northwest Airlines, all but last, NC230Y fitted with wing flaps.
Orion 9D-1
two built, one for Michel Detroyat and registered in France as F-AKHC, and one for the Texas Oilman and philanthropist John E Mabee.
Orion 9E
three aircraft built for TWA with 450 hp (340 kW) Pratt & Whitney Wasp SC-1 engine
Orion 9F
one executive aircraft with a 645 hp (481 kW) Wright R-1820-F2 engine
Orion 9F-1
one executive aircraft built for Phillips Petroleum Company with a 650 hp (480 kW) Wright R-1820-F2 engine
UC-85
one Orion 9D to USAAF in June 1942
Orion-Explorer
modified Orion 9E with Explorer wing, 600 hp (450 kW) Pratt & Whitney Wasp S3H1 engine

== Surviving aircraft ==
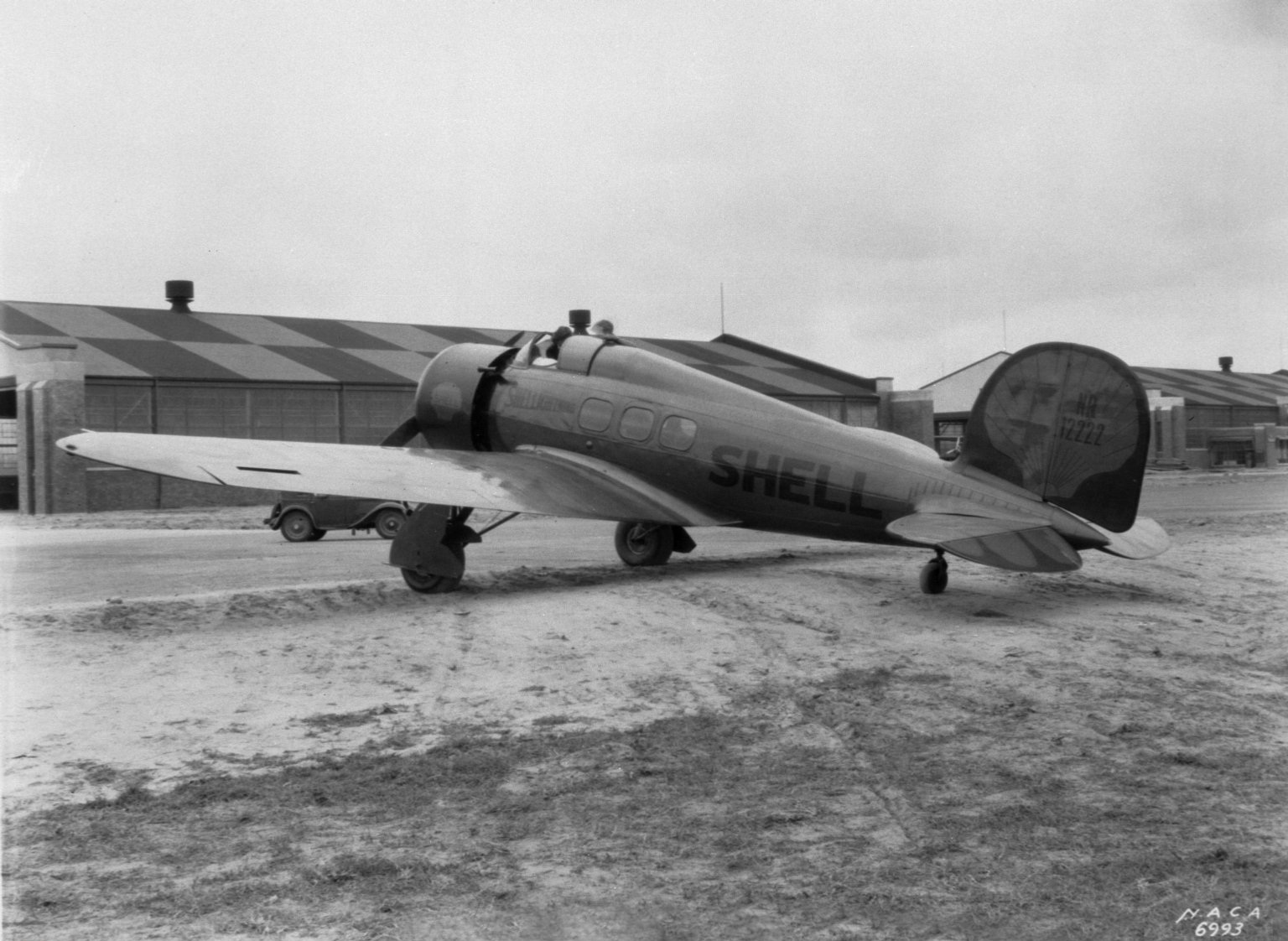
The Shellightning in October 1932

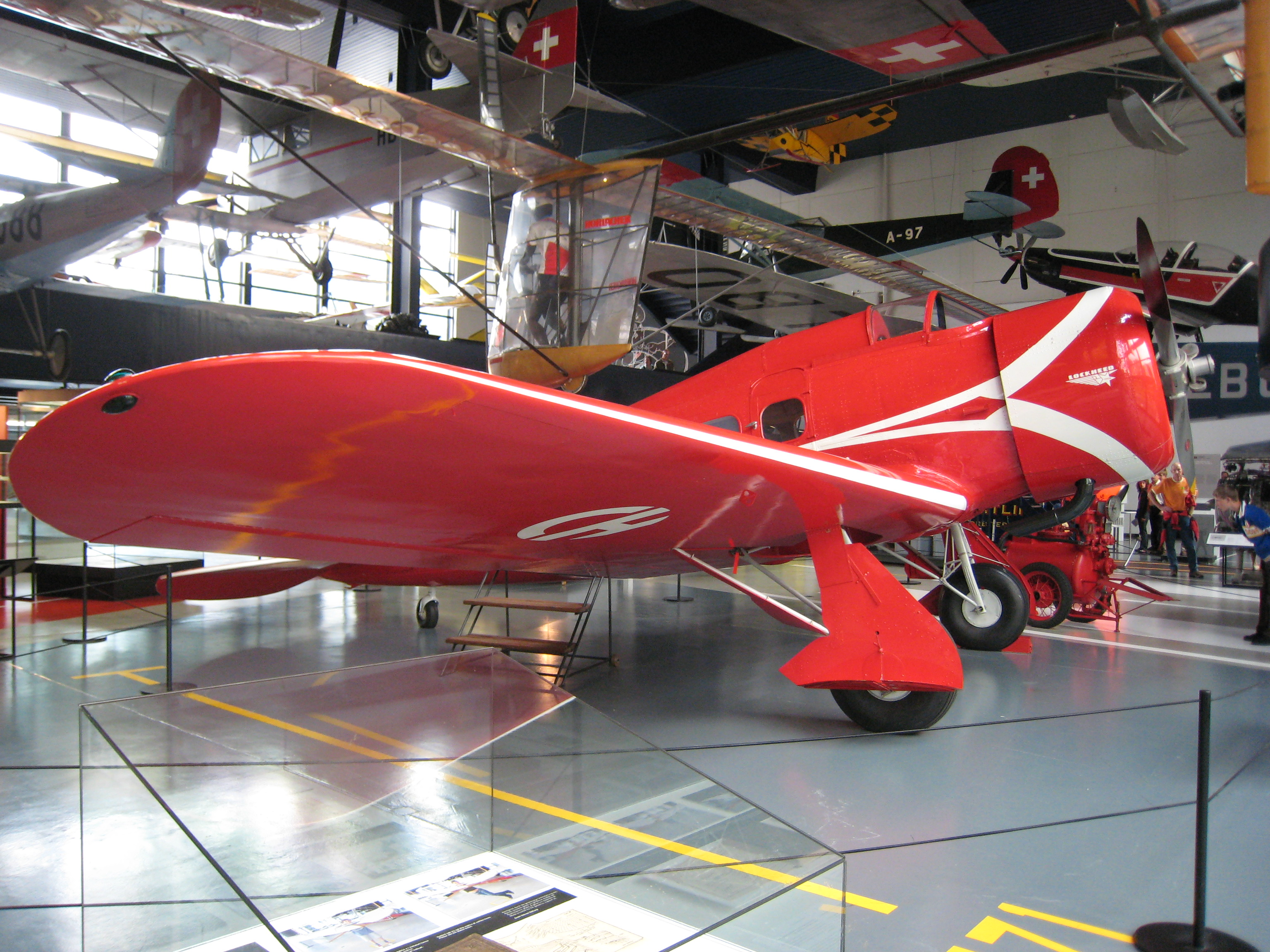
The only surviving Orion, Swiss Transport Museum, Lucerne

In all, Lockheed built a total of 35 Orions costing US$25,000 each new (equivalent to US$529,267 in 2025). The lone remaining Orion was originally built as an experimental Altair with a metal fuselage. This Altair (built in 1931) was damaged in a belly landing accident in Columbus, Ohio, in 1933. It was returned to Lockheed where it was converted in 1934 to an Orion 9C configuration by the original designer of the Orion, Richard A. von Hake, and others who worked for free during a slow period when the Lockheed factory was going into bankruptcy.

It was sold to Shell Aviation Corp., painted yellow-orange and red and named "Shellightning." It was used by Shell's aviation manager, James H. Doolittle, on cross-county and exhibition flights. Jimmy Doolittle made hundreds of trips in this Lockheed, and the aircraft was very much in evidence at air shows, airport dedications, and business meetings across the territories of all three Shell companies in the United States.

In 1936, "Shellightning" was again involved in an accident, in St. Louis, and was stored there. Two years later, Paul Mantz caught the racing bug in addition to his aeronautical movie work. He bought the damaged "Shellightning" and had it rebuilt at Parks Air College in St. Louis, Missouri with a more powerful Wright Cyclone engine and some streamlining to add to its speed. It was repainted red with white trim and Mantz flew the plane in the Bendix Races in 1938 and 1939, coming in third both times. In 1943, he sold the plane and it went through a series of owners until Mantz bought it back in 1955. He retained ownership until selling it to TallMantz Aviation, Inc. in 1962.

In 1964, the plane was sitting out in the open on the flightline at Orange County Airport, now John Wayne Airport, in blue-and-white American Airways trim. Some time in the 1960s it was purchased by Swiss Air and rebuilt to flying status by the famous "Fokker" restoration team and is on display at the Swiss Transport Museum in Lucerne, Switzerland in the livery of the original Swiss Air Orion.

== Operators ==
Mexico

- Lineas Aereas Occidentales

Switzerland

- Swissair

Spain

- Spanish Republican Air Force from LAPE, two from Swissair in 1935/1936.

United States

- Alaska Star Airlines
- American Airways
- Air Express Corporation
- Bowen Air Lines
- Detroit News
- Hal Roach Studios
- Northwest Airways
- Paul Mantz
- Transcontinental and Western Air/TWA
- United States Army Air Forces
- Shell Oil
- Varney Speed Lines
- Wyoming Air Service

== Specifications (Orion 9D) ==
Data from The Complete Encyclopedia of World Aircraft

General characteristics

- Crew: 1
- Capacity: 6 pax
- Length: 28 ft 4 in (8.64 m)
- Wingspan: 42 ft 9.25 in (13.0366 m)
- Height: 9 ft 8 in (2.95 m)
- Wing area: 294.1 sq ft (27.32 m^{2})
- Airfoil: root: Clark Y (18%); tip: Clark Y (9.47%)
- Empty weight: 3,540 lb (1,606 kg)
- Max takeoff weight: 5,200 lb (2,359 kg)
- Powerplant: 1 × Pratt & Whitney R-1340-S1D1 Wasp 9-cylinder air-cooled radial piston engine, 550 hp (410 kW)
- Propellers: 2-bladed fixed-pitch metal propeller

Performance

- Maximum speed: 220 mph (350 km/h, 190 kn)
- Cruise speed: 205 mph (330 km/h, 178 kn)
- Range: 652 mi (1,049 km, 567 nmi)
- Service ceiling: 22,000 ft (6,700 m)

== See also ==
Related development

- Lockheed Model 1, 2 & 5 Vega (high wing)
- Lockheed Model 3 Air Express (parasol wing)
- Lockheed Model 4 & 7 Explorer (low-wing single-seater)
- Lockheed Model 8 Altair (low-wing fixed undercarriage)
- Lockheed Model 8 Sirius (low-wing retractable undercarriage)

Aircraft of comparable role, configuration, and era

- Airspeed Envoy
- General Aviation GA-43
- Heinkel He 70
- Junkers Ju 60
- Kharkiv KhAI-1
- Manshū Hayabusa
- Polikarpov/Rafaelyants PR-12
- Tairov OKO-1
- Vultee V-1
- Northrop Delta

Related lists

- List of aircraft of the Spanish Republican Air Force
- List of aircraft of World War II
- List of Lockheed aircraft
