= Lockheed Air Express =

American passenger and mail aircraft

Air Express
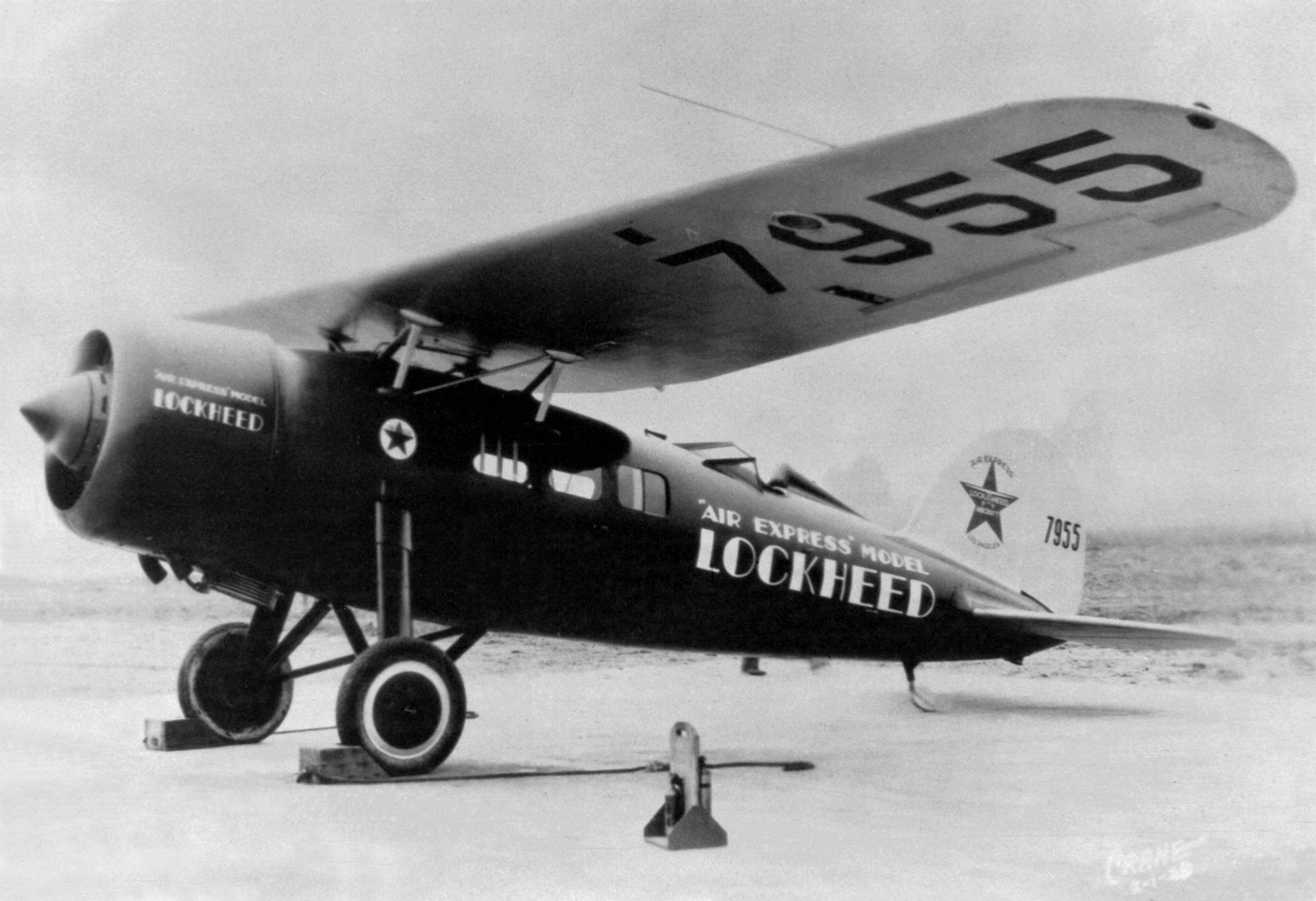

General information
- Type: Passenger and Mail transport
- National origin: United States
- Manufacturer: Lockheed
- Number built: 8

History
- First flight: April 1928
- Developed from: Lockheed Vega

The Lockheed Air Express was the second aircraft design created by the Lockheed Aircraft Company after its founding in 1927; the type first flew in April 1928.

== Description ==
The Air Express design incorporated the original fuselage of the Vega, but in order to meet the requirements of Western Air Express, the wing was raised to a parasol configuration above the fuselage and the cockpit was moved behind the wing, while a more powerful Pratt & Whitney Wasp engine was fitted to ease operations over the Sierra Nevada mountains. The design was a commercial success for the company although only seven were built, plus one Air Express Special.

No Air Expresses have survived to the present day. One, registered NR3057, was flown by Roscoe Turner.

== Variants ==
Lockheed 3 Air Express
Single-engined passenger and mail transport aircraft, seating between four and six passengers in an enclosed cabin, able to carry up to 1,000-lb (454-kg) of mail, powered by a 410-hp (306-kW) Pratt & Whitney Wasp radial piston engine; seven built.
Air Express Special
One-off version built for Laura Ingalls, for a non-stop trans-Atlantic flight in 1931; one built.

== Operators ==
Brazil

- Panair do Brasil

United States

- American Airways
- New York, Rio, and Buenos Aires Line
- Pan American Airways
- Texas Air Transport
- Western Air Express

== Specifications ==
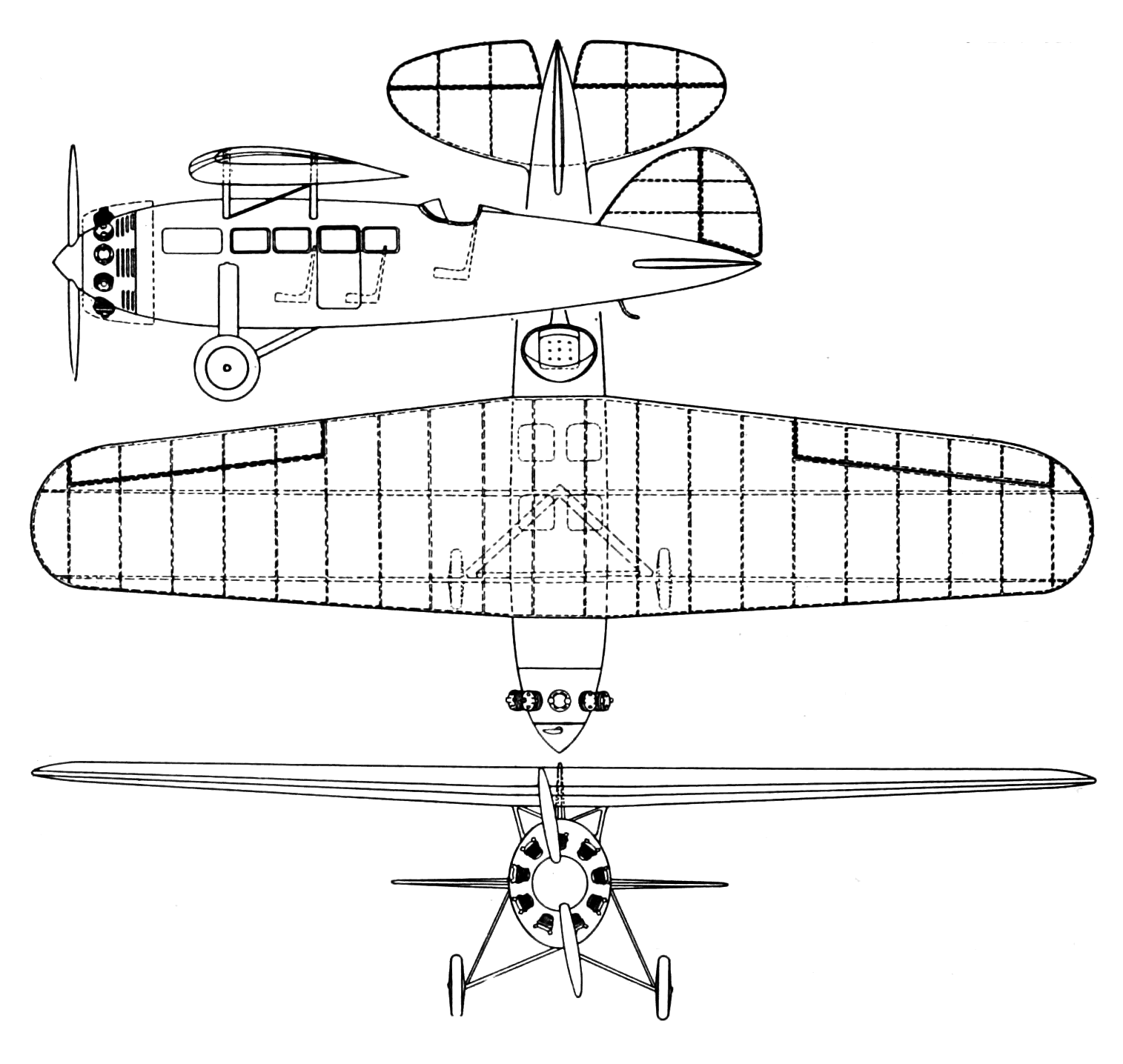
Lockheed Air Express 3-view drawing from Aero Digest March 1929

Data from Lockheed Aircraft since 1913

General characteristics

- Crew: 1
- Capacity: 4 passengers or 100 cu ft (2.8m³) mail
- Length: 27 ft 6 in (8.38 m)
- Wingspan: 42 ft 6 in (12.95 m)
- Height: 8 ft 4.5 in (2.553 m)
- Wing area: 288 sq ft (26.8 m^{2})
- Empty weight: 2,533 lb (1,149 kg)
- Gross weight: 4,375 lb (1,984 kg)
- Powerplant: 1 × Pratt & Whitney Wasp C , 420 hp (310 kW)

Performance

- Maximum speed: 176 mph (283 km/h, 153 kn) (with NACA cowling)
- Cruise speed: 151 mph (243 km/h, 131 kn)
- Range: 750 mi (1,210 km, 650 nmi)
- Service ceiling: 17,250 ft (5,260 m)
- Rate of climb: 1,460 ft/min (7.4 m/s)

== See also ==
Related development

- Lockheed Vega
- Lockheed Explorer
- Lockheed Sirius
- Lockheed Altair

Related lists

- List of Lockheed aircraft
