= Lockheed Vega =

Utility transport aircraft by Lockheed

Vega
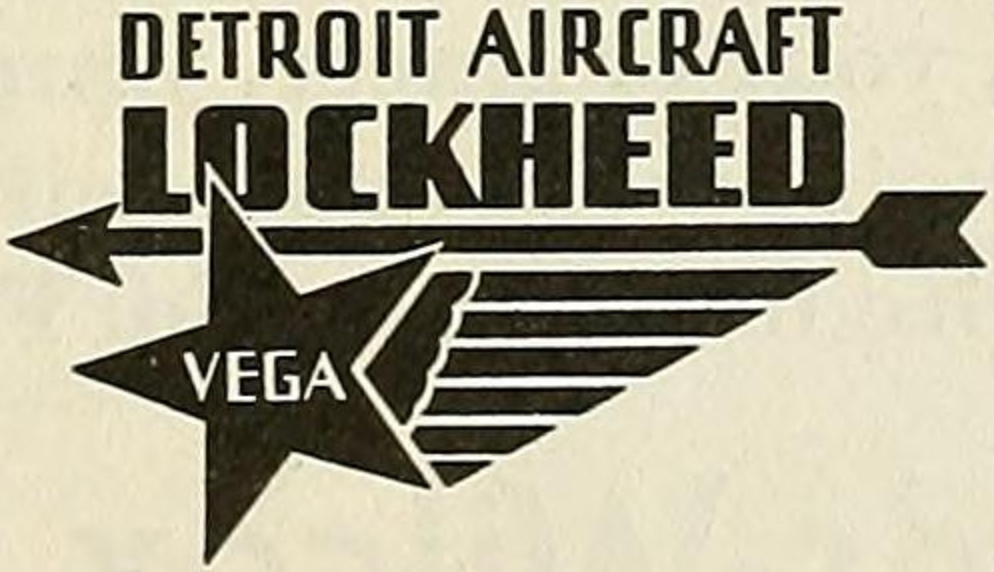

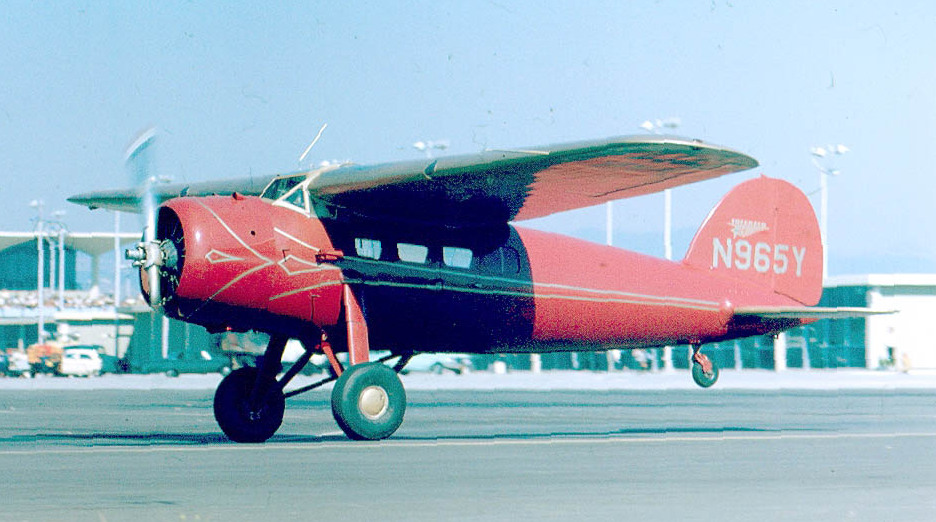

General information
- Type: Transport
- National origin: United States
- Manufacturer: Lockheed Aircraft Limited
- Designer: John Knudsen Northrop and Gerald Vultee
- Status: Retired
- Primary user: Commercial air carriers
- Number built: 132

History
- Introduction date: 1928
- First flight: July 4, 1927

The Lockheed Vega is an American five- to seven-seat high-wing monoplane airliner built by the Lockheed Corporation starting in 1927. It became famous for its use by a number of record-breaking pilots who were attracted to its high speed and long range. Amelia Earhart became the first woman to fly solo across the Atlantic Ocean in one, and Wiley Post used his to prove the existence of the jet stream after flying around the world twice.

== Design and development ==
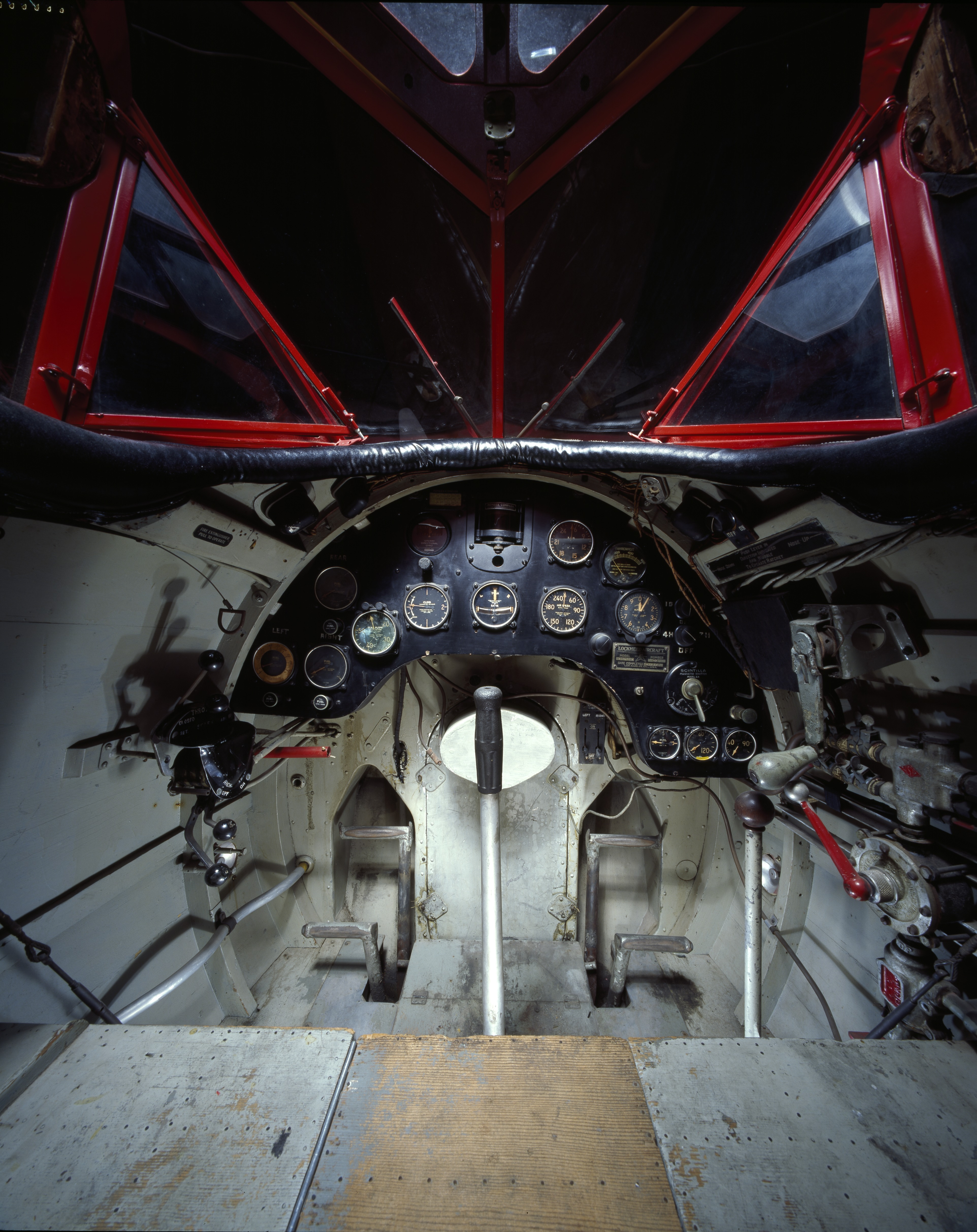
Lockheed Vega Cockpit

Designed by John Knudsen Northrop and Gerald Vultee, both of whom would later form their own companies, the aircraft was originally intended to serve with Lockheed's own airline routes. They set out to build a four-passenger (plus pilot) aircraft that was not only rugged, but also one of the fastest aircraft of its era. Using a wooden monocoque fuselage, plywood-covered cantilever wings and the best engine available, the Vega delivered on the promise of speed.

The fuselage was built from sheets of plywood, skinned over wooden ribs. Using a large concrete mold, a single half of the fuselage shell was laminated in sections with glue between each layer and then a rubber bladder was lowered into the mold and inflated with air to compress the lamination into shape against the inside of the mold. The two fuselage halves were then nailed and glued over a separately constructed rib framework. With the fuselage constructed in this fashion, the wing spar couldn't cut through the fuselage, so the single spar cantilever wing was mounted atop the aircraft. Only the engine and landing gear remained essentially unstreamlined, and on the production versions the undercarriage had teardrop shaped fairings covering the wheels, while only the earliest versions lacked NACA cowlings and had the engine cylinders exposed to the airstream. It was powered by the Wright Whirlwind air-cooled radial engine, which delivered 225 hp (168 kW).

== Operational history ==
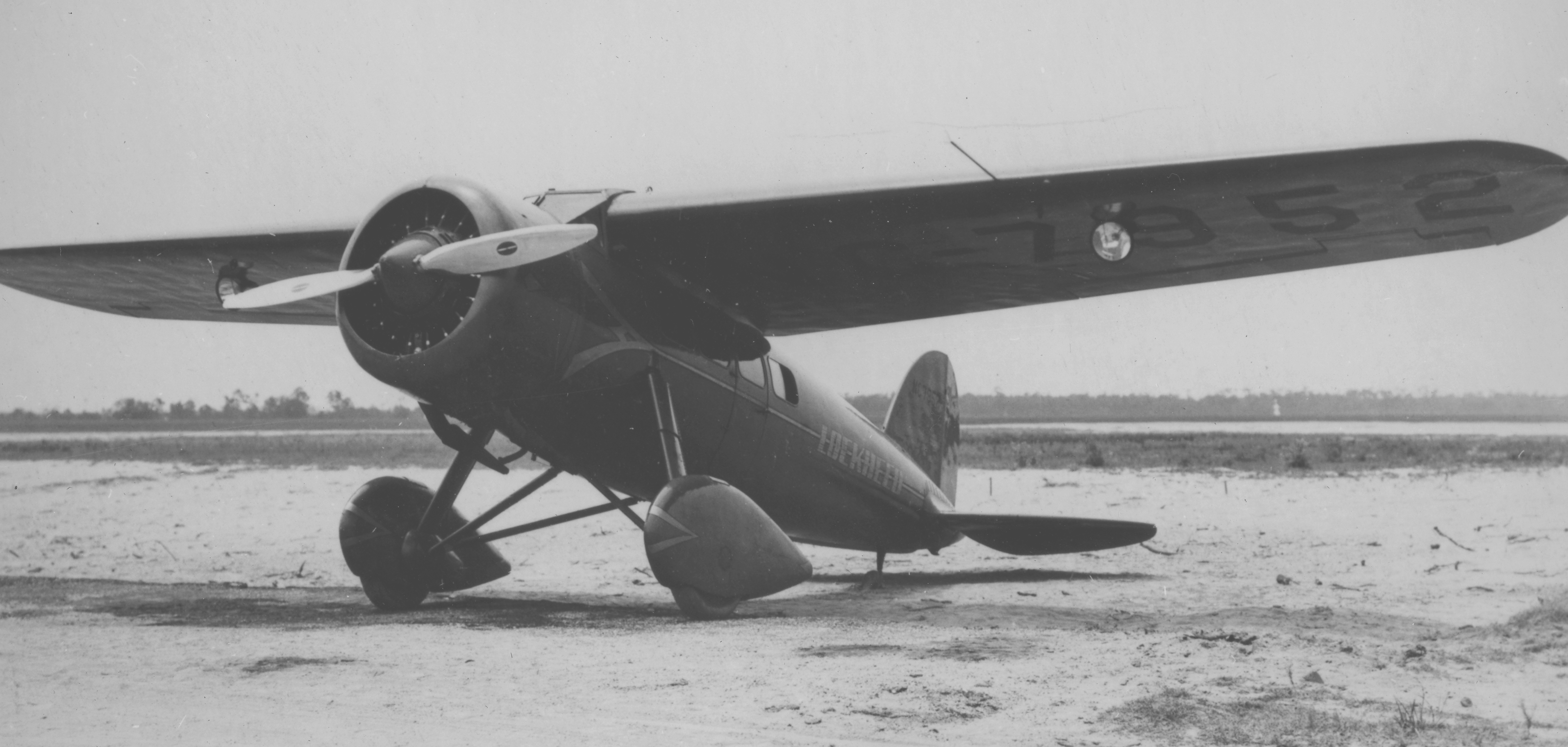
The Lockheed 5B Vega that Amelia Earhart flew across the Atlantic.

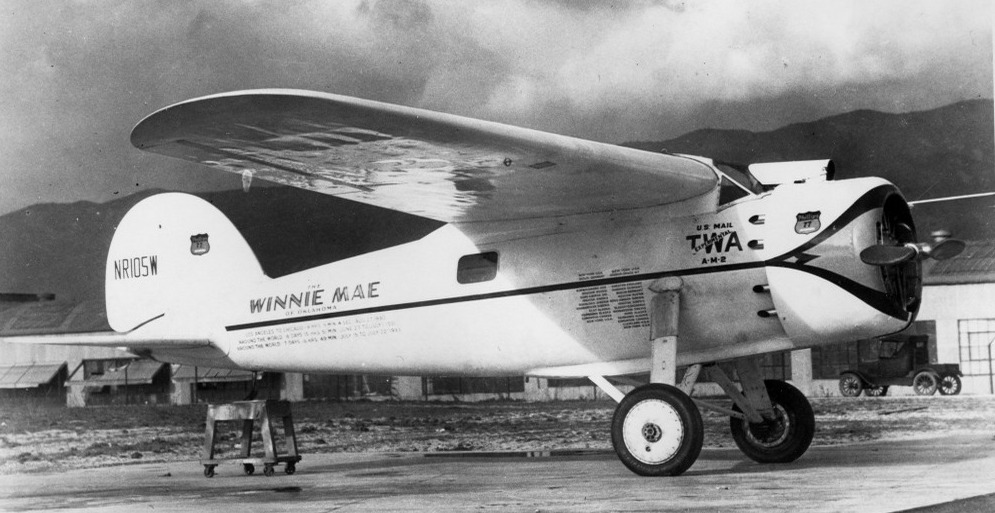
Wiley Post's "Winnie Mae", in which he circled the globe, and proved the existence of the Jet Stream.

The first Vega 1, named the Golden Eagle, flew from Lockheed's Los Angeles plant on July 4, 1927. It could cruise at a then-fast 120 mph (190 km/h), and had a top speed of 135 mph (217 km/h). A number of private owners placed orders for the design, and by the end of 1928, 68 had been produced. In the 1929 National Air Races in Cleveland, Ohio, Vegas won every speed award.

In 1928, Vega Yankee Doodle (NX4769) was used to break transcontinental speed records. On August 19–20, Hollywood stunt flier Arthur C. Goebel broke the coast-to-coast record of Russell Maughan by flying from Los Angeles, California, to Garden City, New York, in 18 hours and 58 minutes, in what was also the first nonstop flight from west to east. On October 25, barnstormer and former mail pilot Charles B.D. Collyer broke the nonstop east to west record set in 1923 by the U.S. Army Air Service in 24 hours and 51 minutes. Trying to break the new West-to-East record on November 3, Collyer crashed near Prescott, Arizona, killing him and the aircraft owner, Harry J. Tucker.

Looking to improve the design, Lockheed delivered the Vega 5 in 1929. Adding the Pratt & Whitney R-1340 Wasp engine of 450 hp (340 kW) and a new NACA cowling improved performance enough to allow the addition of two more seats, and increased cruising speed to 155 mph (249 km/h) and top speed to 165 mph (266 km/h). A variant of the Vega 5 was built specifically for private aviation and executive transport as the L.5A "Executive" although the 5 was also used by many airlines, including Pan American Airlines, Pacific Alaska Airways and Transcontinental and Western Air. A total of 64 Vega 5s were built.

In 1931, the United States Army Air Corps bought two DL-1 Vegas, with the first designated as Y1C-12 and the second, a DL-1B designated as Y1C-17. These both had a formed metal fuselage, while the Y1C-17 had additional fuel tanks in the wings.

The Vega could be difficult to land. In her memoir, Elinor Smith wrote that it had "all the glide potential of a boulder falling off a mountain." In addition, forward and side visibility from the cockpit was extremely limited; Lane Wallace, a columnist for Flying magazine, wrote that "Even [in level flight], the windscreen would offer a better view of the sky than anything else, which would make it more of a challenge to detect changes in attitude or bank angle. On takeoff or landing, there'd be almost no forward visibility whatsoever."

=== Vega DL-1A special ===
A one-off special based on the metal-fuselaged DL-1 was built by the Detroit Aircraft Corporation, and exported to the United Kingdom for Lt. Cmdr. Glen Kidston who named it Puch. It was initially registered in the UK as G-ABFE, then was re-registered as G-ABGK to incorporate Kidston's initials. He used this Vega for a record-breaking flight from the UK to South Africa in April 1931. Following Kidston's death the following month, the aircraft was eventually sold to Australian airline owner Horrie Miller, who entered it in the MacRobertson Air Race. Flown in the race by Miller's Chief Pilot, Capt. Jimmy Woods, it overturned on landing at Aleppo en route, whereupon Woods withdrew from the race and the DL-1A was eventually shipped to Australia. Following repairs and re-registration as VH-UVK, Miller used the aircraft for charter and leisure flying, after which it was impressed by the Royal Australian Air Force in 1941. In 1944 the aircraft was transferred to the Australian Department of Civil Aviation (DCA). Via information from RAAF pilots, DCA declared the Vega to have serious pitch control problems and it would be scrapped. Attempts by James Woods to reclaim the aircraft were ignored, and it was destroyed in October 1945. It was the only Vega to operate in Australia.

== Variants ==
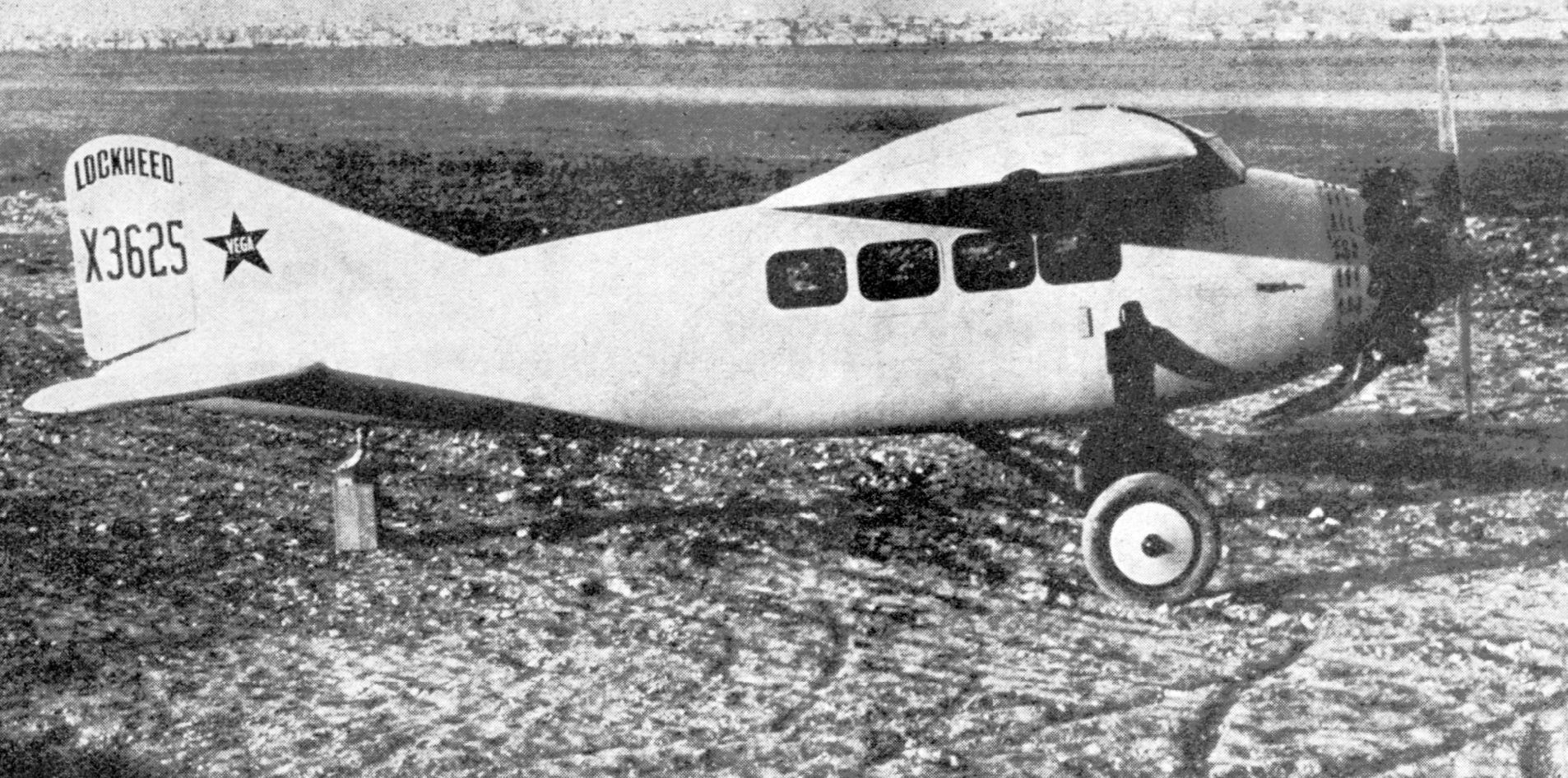
Vega 1 prototype

Vega 1
Five-seat cabin monoplane, accommodation for one pilot and four passengers, powered by a 225 hp (168 kW) Wright J-5, J-5A, J-5AB or J-5C Whirlwind radial piston engine.
Vega 2
Five-seat cabin monoplane, powered by a 300 hp (220 kW) Wright J-6 Whirlwind radial piston engine.
Vega 2A
Redesignation of one Vega 2 aircraft, modified for higher gross weight operation.
Vega 2D

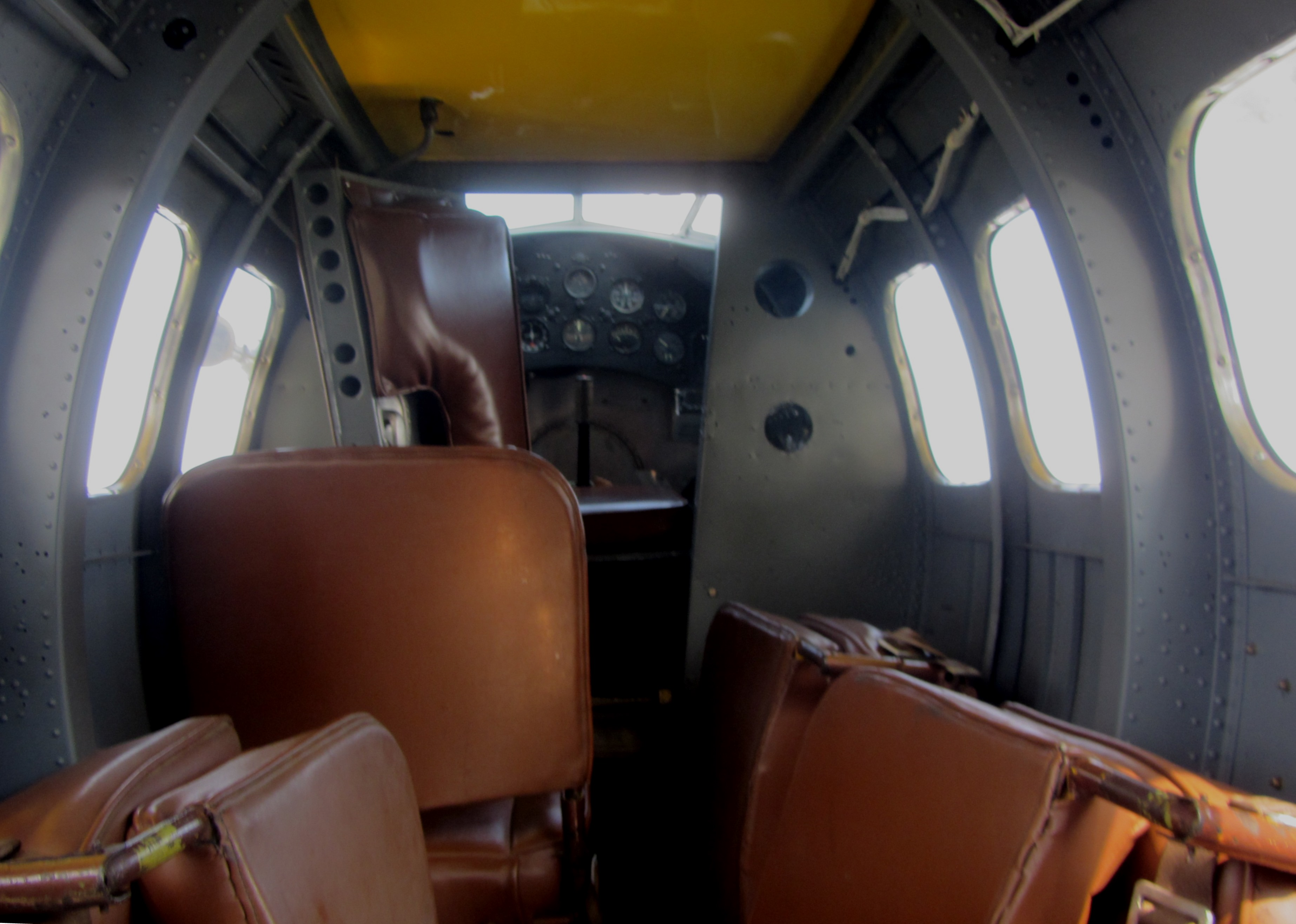
The interior of a Vega 5

Redesignation of two Vega 1s and one Vega 2, each fitted with a 300 hp (220 kW) Pratt & Whitney Wasp radial piston engine.
Vega 5
Improved version, powered by a 410 hp (310 kW) Wasp A, 450 hp (340 kW) Wasp B or 420 hp (310 kW) Wasp C1 radial piston engine.
Vega 5A Executive
Executive transport version, with a plush interior.

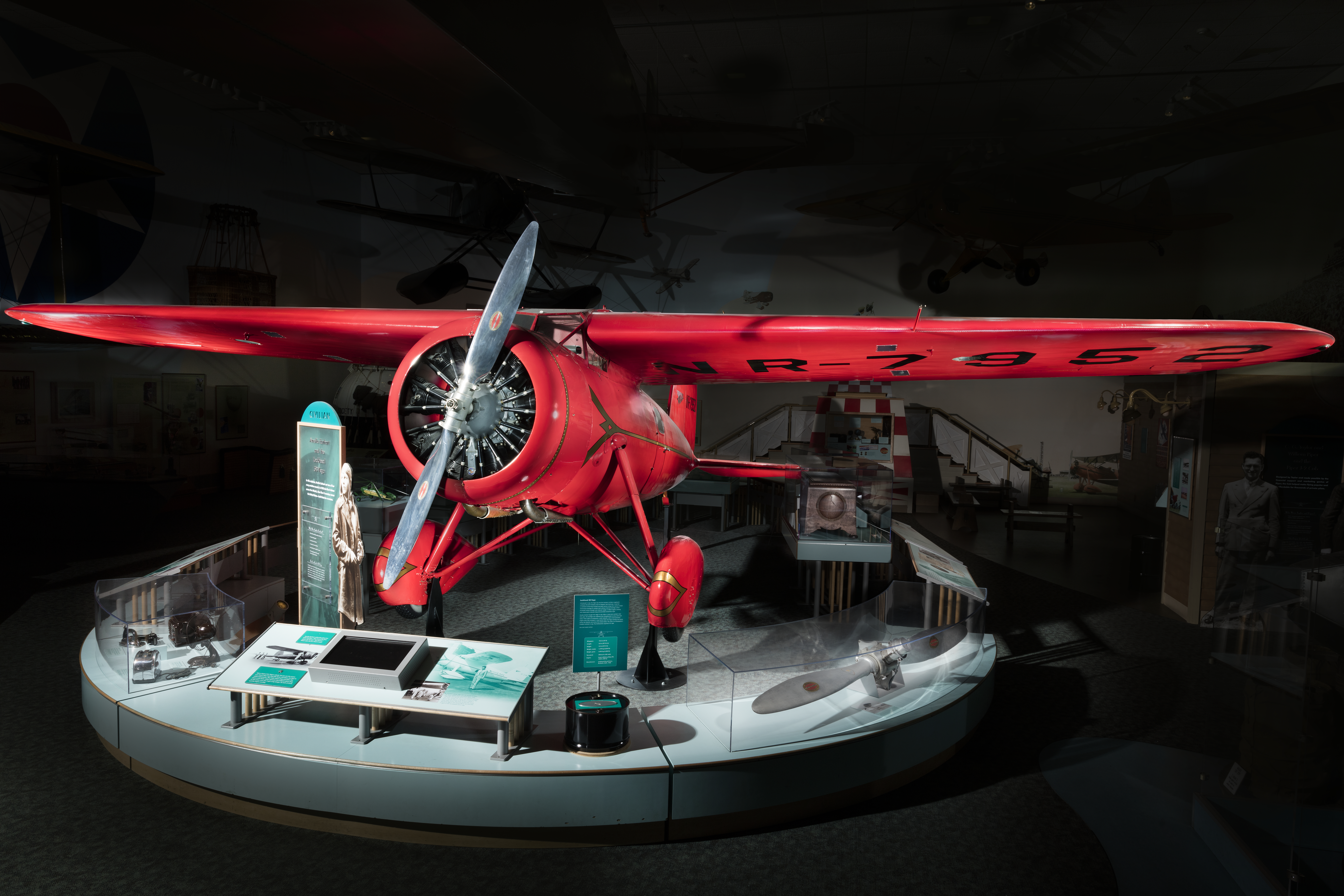
Vega 5B at the Smithsonian Institution National Air and Space Museum

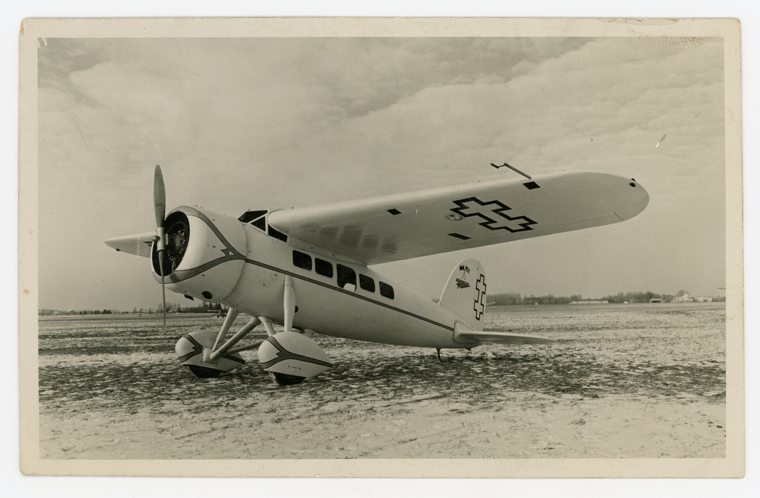
Lockheed 5C Vega of Lithuanian Air Force, 1935-1940

Vega 5B
Seven-seat passenger transport version, built for higher gross weight operations with commercial operators.
Vega 5C
Seven-seat cabin monoplane, with revised tail surfaces, built for higher gross weight operations.
DL-1
Vega 5C with an aluminum fuselage. Built by the Detroit Aircraft Corporation.
DL-1A/DL-1 Special
One-off air racing and record breaking version, c/n 155.
DL-1B
Seven-seat cabin monoplane, similar to the DL-1. Built by the Detroit Aircraft Corporation.
Y1C-12
One DL-1 acquired by the U.S. Army Air Corps for service tests and evaluation.
Y1C-17
One DL-1B acquired by the U.S. Army Air Corps for service tests and evaluation.
UC-101
One Vega 5C impressed into service with the U.S. Army Air Force in 1942.

== Operators ==
=== Commercial operators ===
A large number of airlines and private owners operated Vegas, many with only a small number of airframes.

=== Military operators ===
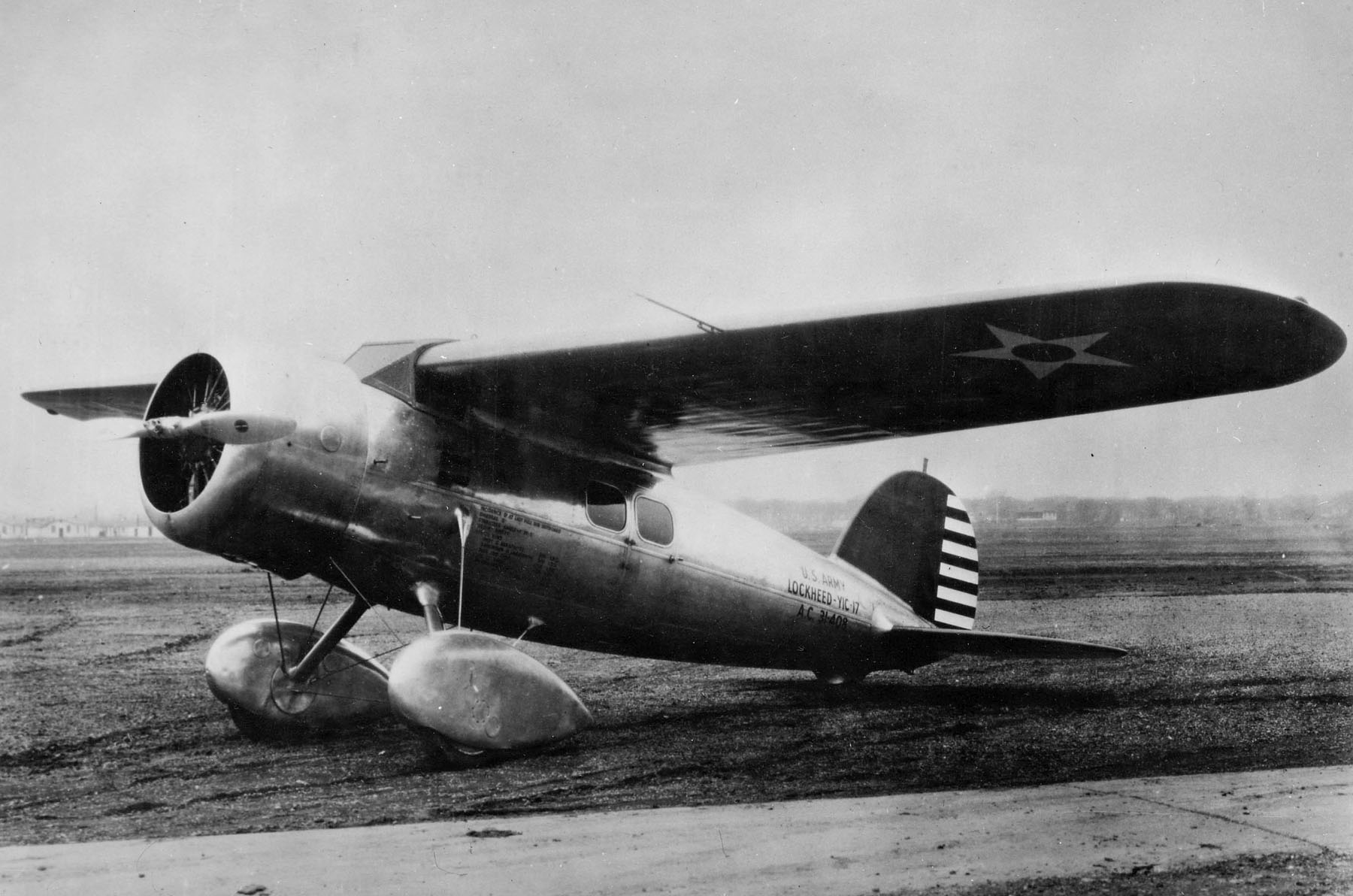
USAAC Y1C-17 showing metal fuselage that distinguished the Detroit-Lockheed examples.

Australia

- Royal Australian Air Force – one aircraft

Lithuania

- Lithuanian Air Force - one aircraft (s/n. 134, former registration NC926Y), 1935-1940, purchased after the trans-Atlantic flight (Lituanica II)

Spain

- Spanish Republican Air Force – one aircraft

United States

- United States Army Air Corps/United States Army Air Forces – three aircraft

== Aircraft on display ==
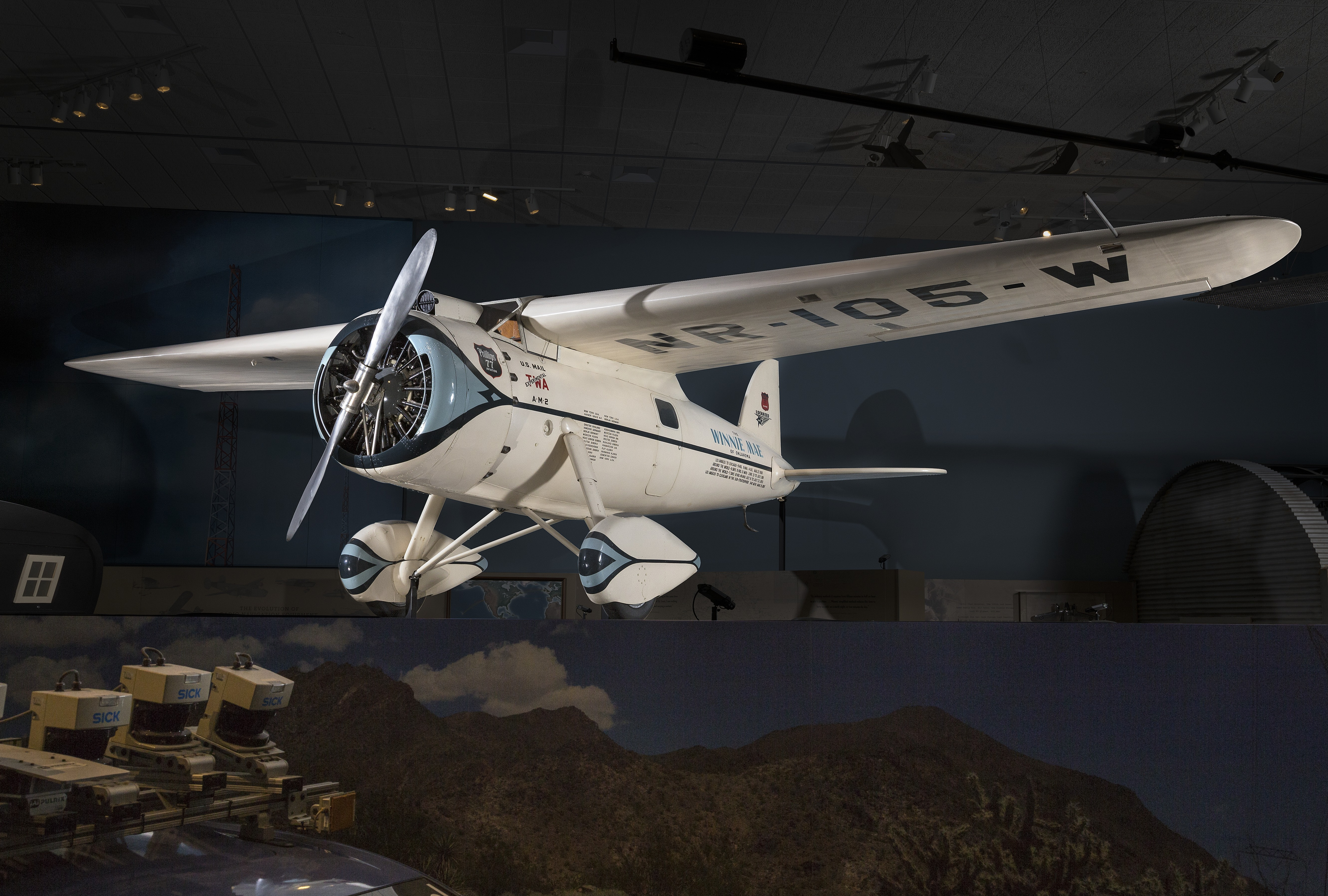
Wiley Post's "Winnie Mae", a model 5C, while on display at the National Air and Space Museum

- 22 – Vega 5B on static display at the National Air and Space Museum in Washington, D.C. This was Amelia Earhart's aircraft.
- 40 – Vega 2D on static display at The Henry Ford Museum in Dearborn, Michigan. It was used by Donald Baxter MacMillan for exploration and mapping.
- 72 – Vega 5C under restoration to airworthy status by Kevin Kimball in Mount Dora, Florida for Fantasy of Flight in Polk City, Florida. First owned by the Independent Oil and Gas Company of Tulsa, Oklahoma; it was restored by Dave Jameson in 1969 in the paint scheme of the Winnie Mae. The aircraft was also an airborne electronics laboratory for the General Electric company. It differs from the original with a larger R-1340 engine installation.
- 122 Winnie Mae – Vega 5C on static display at the National Air and Space Museum in Washington, D.C. It was flown around the world twice and for high altitude testing by Wiley Post.
- 161 – DL-1B on display with Mid America Flight Museum of Mount Pleasant, Texas. It was originally registered as NC12288. Its first post-restoration flight, by John O. Magoffin Jr. and Rick Barter, was on the centenary of powered flight, 17 December 2013.
- 203 Shell Oil Number 7 – Vega 5C owned and operated by Walter Bowe. It was flown by Jimmy Doolittle.

== Specifications (Vega 5C) ==
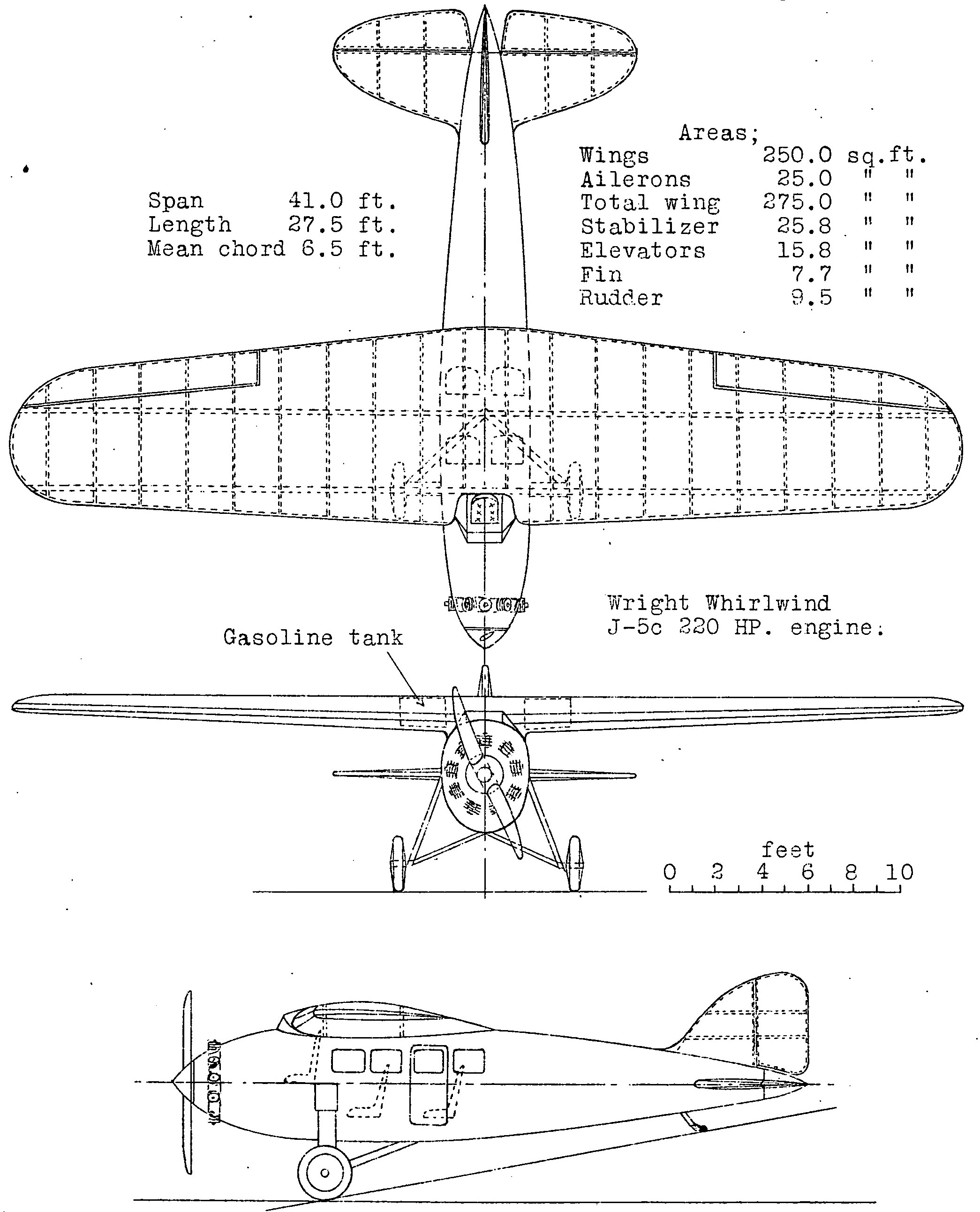
three-view drawing of Vega prototype with original small rudder and uncowled engine.

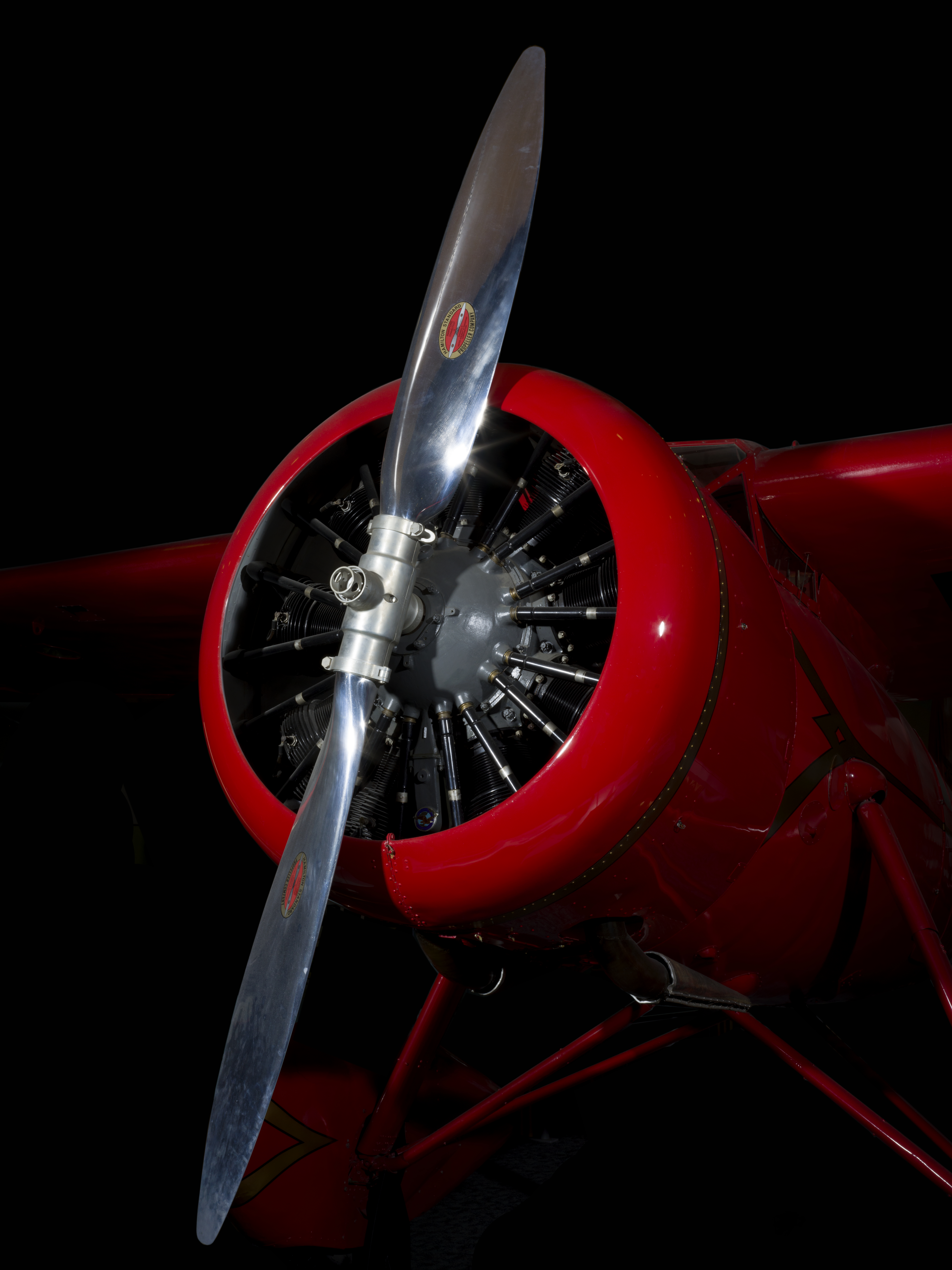
Vega 5B radial engine and prop

Data from Lockheed aircraft since 1913.

General characteristics

- Crew: 1
- Capacity: 6 pax
- Length: 27 ft 6 in (8.38 m)
- Wingspan: 41 ft (12 m)
- Height: 8 ft 6 in (2.59 m)
- Wing area: 275 sq ft (25.5 m^{2})
- Airfoil: root: Clark Y (18%); tip: Clark Y (9.47%)
- Empty weight: 2,565 lb (1,163 kg)

Vega 5C floatplane 3,153 lb (1,430 kg)

- Gross weight: 4,500 lb (2,041 kg)

Vega 5C floatplane 4,880 lb (2,210 kg)

- Fuel capacity: 160 US gal (130 imp gal; 610 L)
- Powerplant: 1 × Pratt & Whitney R-1340C Wasp 9-cylinder air-cooled radial piston engine, 450 hp (340 kW)
- Propellers: 2-bladed fixed-pitch propeller

Performance

- Maximum speed: 185 mph (298 km/h, 161 kn) with NACA cowling

Vega 5C floatplane with NACA cowling 175 mph (282 km/h)

- Cruise speed: 165 mph (266 km/h, 143 kn)

Vega 5C floatplane with NACA cowling 160 mph (260 km/h)

- Range: 725 mi (1,167 km, 630 nmi)

Vega 5C floatplane 620 mi (1,000 km)

- Service ceiling: 19,000 ft (5,800 m)

Vega 5C floatplane 17,000 ft (5,200 m)

- Rate of climb: 1,300 ft/min (6.6 m/s)

Vega 5C floatplane 1,100 ft/min (5.6 m/s)

- Wing loading: 16.4 lb/sq ft (80 kg/m^{2})

Vega 5C floatplane 17.7 lb/sq ft (86 kg/m^{2})

- Power/mass: 0.1 hp/lb (0.16 kW/kg)

Vega 5C floatplane 0.0926 hp/lb (0.1522 kW/kg)

== See also ==
Related development

- Lockheed Air Express
- Lockheed Altair
- Lockheed Explorer
- Lockheed Model 8 Sirius
- Lockheed Model 9 Orion

Aircraft of comparable role, configuration, and era

- Avia 156
- Consolidated Fleetster
- ICAR Comercial

Related lists

- List of aircraft of World War II
- List of Lockheed aircraft
