= Lockheed L-301 =

Experimental air-breathing hypersonic aircraft project

L-301
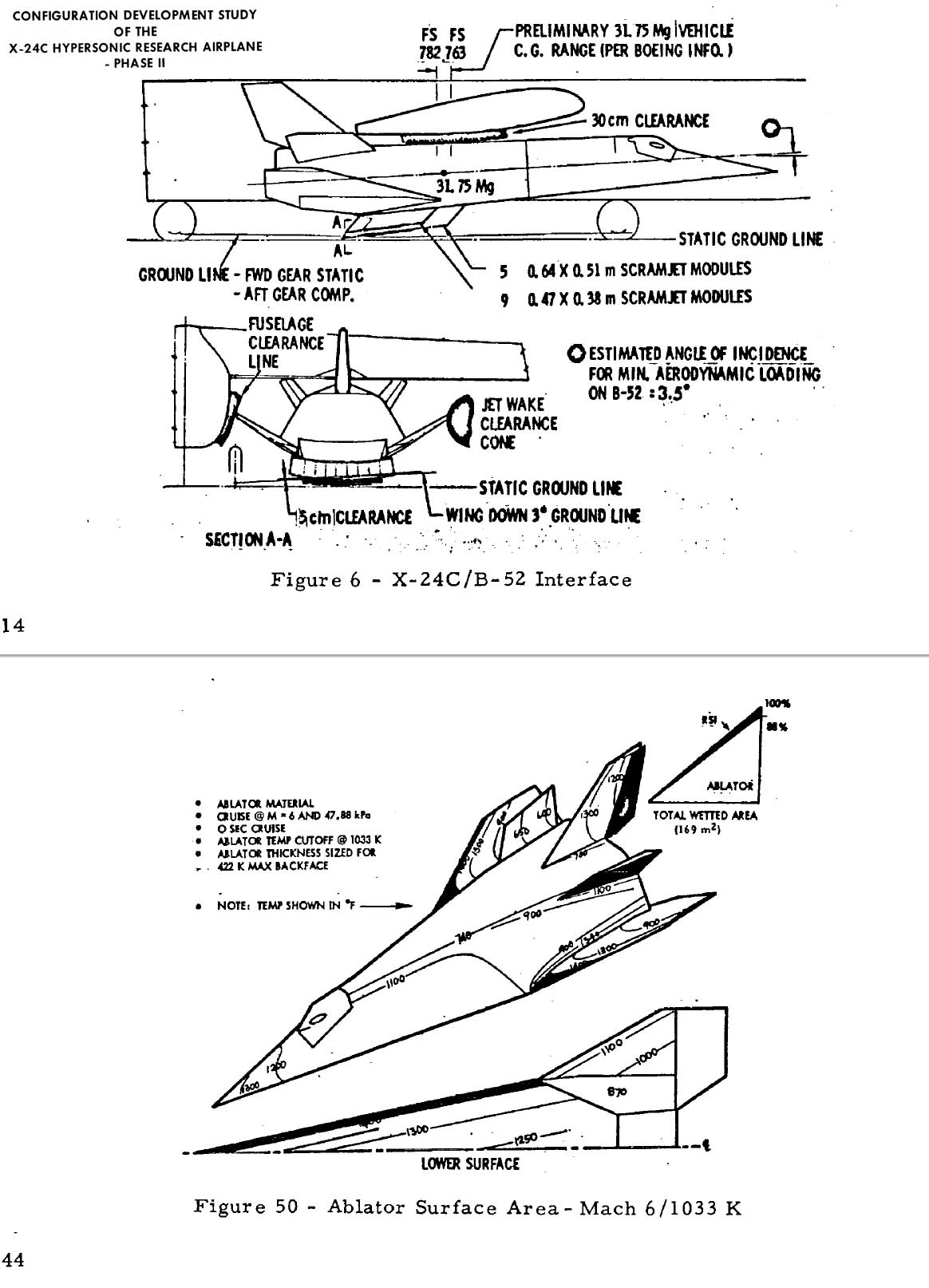
- X-24C configuration images circa January 1977

General information
- Type: Hypersonic research project
- National origin: United States
- Manufacturer: Lockheed
- Status: Cancelled project
- Number built: None

Lockheed L-301 (sometimes called the X-24C, though this designation was never officially assigned) was an experimental air-breathing hypersonic aircraft project. It was developed by the NASA and United States Air Force (USAF) organization National Hypersonic Flight Research Facility (NHFRF or NHRF), with Skunk Works as the prime contractor. In January 1977, the program was "tentatively scheduled to operate two vehicles for eight years and to conduct 100 flights per vehicle." NASA discontinued work on L-301 and NHRF in September 1977 due to budget constraints and lack of need.

== Development ==
The X-24C-L301 was a scaled-up derivative of the Martin X-24C project that was to have been a hypersonic follow-on to the X-15 and X-24 (specifically the X-24B) programs, to take lessons learned from both and integrate them into an airframe capable of at least reaching Mach 8 and engaging in hypersonic skip-glide maneuvers for long range missions. The vehicle would have used both air breathing ram or scramjet propulsion as well as a rocket engine, carrying both RP-1 and LH2 propellant as well as on-board stores of LOX. The X-24C-L301 languished at the design phase when the X-24C project was shelved in September 1977 due a tight NASA budget.

== Design ==
=== Propulsion ===
Originally intended to carry the same XLR-99 engine used by the X-15, the primary engine was changed to the LR-105, which was the sustainer engine used on the Atlas launcher. This rocket engine, burning RP-1 and LOX, was intended to accelerate the X-24C to hypersonic speeds in order to ignite the hydrogen fueled, air breathing ram/scramjet mounted in the belly of the airframe with which it would attain cruise speeds of at least Mach 6 and peak velocities of Mach 8+ at altitudes of 90,000 feet (27,000 m) or more. As such, this vehicle was plainly not intended to reach orbit.

=== Airframe ===
Design of the aircraft in various wind tunnel models and contractor drawings seems to follow variations of the FDL-5 and FDL-8 lifting body shapes originally developed by the USAF Flight Dynamics Laboratory in the 1950s, which were used in the earlier X-23 and X-24A/B programs. With a radically swept delta wing, and 2, 3, or 4 vertical stabilizers, as well as several body flaps (depending on the model), the vehicle did not lack for control surfaces. The vehicle measured 74 feet 10 inches (22.81 m) long, 24 ft 2 in (7.37 m) wingspan, and 20 ft 7 in (6.27 m) height.

Various drawings show a payload bay 12 feet (3.7 m) long and perhaps 5 feet (1.5 m) diameter.
