= Lockheed CL-288 =

American interceptor concept

CL-288

General information
- Type: Interceptor aircraft
- National origin: United States
- Manufacturer: Lockheed Corporation
- Status: Conceptual

History
- Developed from: Lockheed F-104 Starfighter

The Lockheed CL-288 was a conceptual interceptor aircraft based on the Lockheed F-104 Starfighter, powered by two wing-mounted engines.
