= Lockheed XFM-2 =

Proposed fighter aircraft

General information
- Type: Heavy fighter/bomber destroyer
- Manufacturer: Lockheed Corporation
- Status: Cancelled in 1936
- Primary user: United States Army Air Corps
- Number built: 0

The Lockheed XPB-3, later designated XFM-2 (PB – pursuit, biplace / FM – fighter, multi-seat), was a proposed American heavy fighter aircraft, developed by the Lockheed Corporation during the mid-1930s. Intended as a heavy fighter and bomber destroyer for operation by the United States Army Air Corps, it failed to win a contract for construction of a prototype, the Bell YFM-1 Airacuda being preferred.

== Design and development ==
Given the Lockheed designation Model 11, the XFM-2 was developed in response to a United States Army Air Corps requirement for a heavy, twin-engined "bomber destroyer". Originally designated XPB-3 in the "pursuit, biplace" category, it was redesignated "XFM-2", for "fighter, multiplace" early in development. Intended to be powered by two Allison V-1710 supercharged engines, the aircraft was designed for an armament of two 37 mm cannons: one mounted in a nose turret and the other in a dorsal turret behind the cockpit.

The XFM-2 featured a tricycle landing gear configuration and was a mid-wing monoplane of nearly medium bomber size. The empennage featured a twin-tail arrangement. Although the XFM-2 design was evaluated favorably by the Air Corps, the Bell YFM-1 Airacuda was selected to fill the bomber destroyer requirement, and further work on the XFM-2 was abandoned.

== See also ==
Aircraft of comparable role, configuration, and era

- Bell YFM-1 Airacuda

Related lists

- List of fighter aircraft
- List of military aircraft of the United States
