= 1932 in aviation =

This is a list of aviation-related events from 1932:

== Events ==
- The Canadian Siskins aerobatic team is retired.
- James Work founds the Brewster Aeronautical Corporation.
- Richard Ormonde Shuttleworth buys a 1928 de Havilland DH.60X Moth (G-EBWD), which he bases at Old Warden airfield in Bedfordshire, England. It remains there as of 2012, the longest continuous base for a single aircraft in aviation history.
- The French Army's Aéronautique Militaire retires the last of its Breguet 14 aircraft. The Breguet 14 had been in service since 1917.
- The United States Department of Commerce's Aeronautics Branch (predecessor of the Federal Aviation Administration) issues a transport pilot license issued to C. Alfred "Chief" Anderson. Anderson is believed to be the first African American to receive a United States Government transport pilot license.
- The planned eighth Ford National Reliability Air Tour is cancelled. The Great Depression has placed severe financial pressure on municipal budgets, leaving cities and towns that might have hosted pilots participating in the air tour without the funds to host them or to maintain the airports the tour would have used. Moreover, the Ford Trimotor no longer sets the aviation industry standard for airliner technology thanks to the technological advances made by competitors such as Boeing and the Douglas Aircraft Company, and Henry Ford's interest in promoting aviation or expanding his company's aviation ventures has waned after the February 1928 death of his chief test pilot and close friend Harry J. Brooks in an airplane crash. Although Ford sponsors no further National Reliability Air Tours, a recreation of the air tours of 1925–1931 will take place in 2003.

=== January ===
- January 1 – The first United States Government regulations governing gliders and gliding go into effect.
- January 20 – Imperial Airways weekly airmail service is extended through Africa as far as Cape Town.
- January 26 – After the Stinson Model R prototype he is piloting runs out of fuel over Lake Michigan during a demonstration flight from Chicago, Illinois, Edward "Eddie" Stinson – the founder of the Stinson Aircraft Company – attempts to land the plane on a golf course. The plane's wing strikes a flagpole and shears off and the plane crashes, killing Stinson and injuring the other three people on board.
- January 29 – Imperial Japanese Navy seaplanes from the seaplane carrier Notoro attack Nationalist Chinese military positions in Shanghai, China, beginning Japanese air operations in the Shanghai Incident. The operations, which will continue into February, are the first significant military air operations to take place in East Asia.
- January 30 – The Imperial Japanese Navy aircraft carrier Kaga arrives in Chinese territorial waters at the outbreak of the Shanghai Incident. The Japanese Navy's use of aircraft carriers in the Shanghai Incident is history's first significant combat use of carrier-borne airpower.

=== February ===
- February 1 – The Imperial Japanese Navy aircraft carrier Hōshō joins the carrier Kaga in Chinese territorial waters during the Shanghai Incident.
- February 5 – The first air-to-air clash of the Shanghai Incident takes place, between five Japanese aircraft from the aircraft carrier Hōshō and nine Nationalist Chinese fighters.
- February 14 – Ruth Nichols sets a new altitude record for a diesel-powered aircraft, 6,047 m (19,839 ft) in a modified Lockheed Vega.
- February 22 – During the Shanghai Incident, three Imperial Japanese Navy Nakajima A1N2 fighters from the aircraft carrier Kaga score the first air-to-air kill in Japanese history, shooting down a Nationalist Chinese Boeing fighter piloted by an American volunteer.

=== March ===
- During the German election campaign of March–April 1932, Adolf Hitler becomes the first politician in history to use air travel to make political campaign appearances in several cities and towns possible in a single day, flying with planes operated by Deutsche Luft Hansa. Before the campaign ends in the election of April 10, 1932, Hitler will speak in 46 cities and towns during two one-week-long "Flights Over Germany."
- The final Avro 504 leaves the production line. The type has been in continuous production for nineteen years.
- March 6 – The Couzinet 33 passenger aircraft Biarritz sets out from France to establish the first air link between France and New Caledonia.
- March 20 – Luftschiffbau Zeppelin begins regular transatlantic services between Germany and Recife, Brazil, using the dirigible Graf Zeppelin. The service will continue until 1936, averaging one round-trip per month.
- March 24–28 – Jim Mollison sets a new speed record between the United Kingdom and Cape Town, taking 4 days 17 hours in a de Havilland Puss Moth
- March 25 – Dobrolyot is expanded into a USSR-wide service and has its name changed to Aeroflot

=== April ===
- The Spanish airline LAPE begins operations.
- April 1 – Hillman's Airways begins its first scheduled service, flying between Romford and Clacton-on-Sea, England, using a de Havilland Puss Moth and a de Havilland Fox Moth.
- April 5 – The Couzinet 33 passenger aircraft Biarritz lands at La Tontouta, New Caledonia, establishing the first air link between France and New Caledonia. It had departed France on March 6.
- April 16 – Record-setting aviator Frank Hawks is injured and his Travel Air Type R Mystery Ship Texaco 13 is badly damaged when he crashes on takeoff from a soggy field at Worcester, Massachusetts. He recovers and the airplane is repaired.
- April 19–28 – C. W. A. Scott sets a new solo speed record between the United Kingdom and Darwin, Australia, taking 8 days 20 hours in a de Havilland Gipsy Moth
- April 27 – Imperial Airways commences a regular passenger service to Cape Town, South Africa.

=== May ===
- The Egyptian Air Force is formed.
- Participating in prototype form, the Boeing Y1B-9 bomber proves impossible to intercept during United States Army Air Corps exercises, strengthening calls for improved air defense warning systems in the United States.
- May 9 – At Wright Field outside Dayton, Ohio, United States Army Air Corps Captain Albert Hegenberger makes the first completely blind solo flight entirely on instruments, in a Consolidated NY-2.
- May 11 – Tragedy strikes as the United States Navy dirigible USS Akron (ZRS-4) attempts to land in front of thousands of spectators at Camp Kearny in San Diego, California, after a 77-hour flight from Naval Air Station Lakehurst, New Jersey, when Akron suddenly lurches upward, surprising the sailors handling her lines. Four men cling to a line as Akron rises; one falls from a height of 15 feet (4.6 meters) and survives with a broken arm, but two others fall to their deaths from altitudes of between 100 and 200 feet (30 and 61 meters). Dangling 200 feet (61 meters) below Akron, the fourth man, Seaman Apprentice C. M. "Bud" Cowart, is carried out to sea at an altitude of 2,000 feet (610 meters) and finally is reeled aboard Akron after two hours on the rope.
- May 15 – 1932 Kimberley rescue: German pilot Hans Bertram and mechanic Adolph Klausmann, attempting a global circumnavigation eastabout in a Junkers W 33 seaplane, endure a storm in the Timor Sea, forcing them to land off a remote part of the Kimberley coast of north-western Australia. The stranded men spend almost six weeks severely deprived of food and water and are close to death when rescued by a search party of aborigines on June 22.
- May 16 – The United States Department of Commerce's Aeronautics Branch publishes a new rule for a scheduled air transport pilot rating, requiring pilots to demonstrate their ability to use airway navigation aids and to fly specified maneuvers guided entirely by instruments before they can receive the rating. Pilots may receive the new rating at any time during the remainder of 1932, and it will become mandatory on January 1, 1933 for pilots making interstate flights.
- May 17 – Flying an Avro Avian IV, Beryl Markham completes a flight of approximately 6,000 miles (9,700 km) from Nairobi, Kenya, to Heston Aerodrome outside London, England. She had departed Nairobi on 24 April and flown via Sudan, Egypt, the Mediterranean Sea, and Europe in seven days of actual flying, with several forced landings and stops for engine repairs along the way. Despite having only 127 hours of flight time as a pilot before attempting the trip, she makes the flight without a radio and navigates by sight. She will make the return flight to Kenya a few months later.
- May 20–21 – Amelia Earhart, flying a Lockheed Vega, becomes the first woman to make a solo flight across the North Atlantic, flying from Harbour Grace in Newfoundland to Derry in Northern Ireland in 14 hours 54 minutes.

=== June ===
- During United States Army Air Corps (USAAC) trials, the Martin XB-10 — prototype of the Martin B-10 bomber — records a speed of 197 mph (317 km/h) at an altitude of 6,000 ft (1,829 m). Half again as fast as biplane bombers of the period and faster than contemporary fighters, the B-10 makes all other existing bombers obsolete and begins a revolution in bomber design. USAAC General Henry H. Arnold describes the B-10 as the airpower wonder of its day.
- June 7 – Misr Airlines, which later will become EgyptAir, is founded. It will begin flight operations in July 1933.
- June 15 – Record-setting United States Navy pilot Herbert C. Rodd dies in the crash of a Vought O2U Corsair seaplane near Hampton Roads, Virginia.
- June 24 – In the Soviet Union, Leningrad's Shosseynaya Airport (the future Pulkovo Airport) opens. Its first flight, an aircraft carrying passengers and mail, arrives late in the afternoon after a two-hour-and-a-half-hour flight from Moscow.
- June 29 – A Curtiss F9C Sparrowhawk parasite fighter hooks onto the U.S. Navy dirigible USS Akron (ZRS-4) for the first time.

=== July ===
- In an early use of air travel to make political campaign appearances in several cities and towns possible in a single day, Adolf Hitler makes his third "Flight Over Germany," a 14-day trip by air in which he makes appearances at 50 urban mass meetings. Hitler had pioneered the use of air travel in political campaigns with his first two "Flights Over Germany" during the March–April 1932 German election campaign.
- July 2 – With the 1932 presidential election campaign underway in the United States, Franklin D. Roosevelt becomes the first U.S. presidential candidate to travel by air during his campaign, flying in a chartered Ford Trimotor from Albany, New York, to Chicago, Illinois, to address the 1932 Democratic National Convention.
- July 16 – During a flight from Santiago, Chile, to Governor Francisco Gabrielli International Airport in Mendoza, Argentina, the Pan American-Grace Airways (Panagra) Ford 5-AT-C Trimotor San José (registration NC403H) crashes on Chile's Cerro El Plomo in the Andes Mountains during a severe snowstorm, killing all nine people on board. Buried in ice and snow, its wreckage will remain undiscovered until March 1934.
- July 21 – Wolfgang von Gronau sets out to make a round-the-world trip in a Dornier Wal. One hundred and eleven days later, it will be the first such trip made in a flying boat.
- July 23 – Aviation pioneer Alberto Santos-Dumont hangs himself.

=== August ===
- August 14 – Alexei M. Cheremukhin, co-designer (with Boris Yuriev) of the Soviet TsAGI 1-EA pioneering single lift rotor helicopter, takes the 1-EA to an unofficial record altitude for helicopters of the era, of 605 meters (1,985 feet).
- August 14–28 – The third International Tourist Aircraft Contest Challenge 1932 takes place in Berlin. The Polish crew of Franciszek Zwirko and Stanislaw Wigura win it in the RWD-6 plane.
- August 14–23 – Frances Mersalis and Louise Thaden set a women's flight endurance record of 8 days 4 hours.
- August 18 – Auguste Piccard and Max Cosyns set a new world altitude record for human fight, rising in a balloon to an altitude of 16,201 meters (53,153 feet).
- August 18–19 – Jim Mollison makes the first solo east-to-west crossing of the Atlantic, flying his de Havilland Puss Moth G-ABXY The Heart's Content from near Dublin to New Brunswick.
- August 21–27 – The 7,363-kilometer (4,575-mile) Challenge 1932 air race over Europe takes place.
- August 23 – Panama establishes its Civil Aviation Authority.
- August 24–25 – Amelia Earhart becomes the first woman to make a nonstop solo flight across North America, flying from Los Angeles, California, to Newark, New Jersey. The flight also sets a women's endurance record of 19 hours 5 minutes and a women's nonstop distance record of 3,938 kilometers (2,447 miles).

=== September ===
- September 3
  - Jimmy Doolittle sets a new landplane airspeed record of 296 mph (476 km/h) in the Gee Bee R-1 at the National Air Races in Cleveland, Ohio.
  - Piloting a replica 1910 Curtiss Model D pusher biplane in a mock dogfight with an autogiro at low altitude at the National Air Races in Cleveland, movie stunt pilot Al Wilson suffers head injuries in the crash of his plane after the autogiro lands, he buzzes it, and his plane loses lift in a downdraft created by the autogiro's still-spinning rotor and collides with the autogiro. He dies on September 5.
- September 7 – Thomas Settle and Winfield Bushnell set a new balloon distance record of 1,550 km (960 mi) between Basel, Switzerland and Wilno, Poland.
- September 11 – The Challenge 1932 winners, Polish pilots Franciszek Zwirko and Stanislaw Wigura, die in an air crash.
- September 13 – The American Nurse, a Bellanca CH-400 or Bellanca J-300 Long-Distance Special formerly known as Miss Veedol, takes off from Floyd Bennett Field in Brooklyn, New York to attempt a record nonstop New York City-to-Rome flight of 6,884 km (4,278 mi; 3,717 nmi), lasting 25 to 26 hours and passing over Florence, Italy, where nurse Edna Newcomer is to parachute from the plane in honor of Florence Nightingale. The ocean liner SS France later sights The American Nurse over the Atlantic Ocean about 400 miles (350 nmi; 640 km) from Cape Finisterre, Spain, but the plane and the three people aboard it subsequently disappear without trace.
- September 16 – Cyril Uwins sets a new heavier-than-air altitude record of 43,976 ft (13,404 m) in a Vickers Vespa.
- September 20 – Transcontinental and Western Air signs a contract with Douglas Aircraft for the development of the Douglas Commercial Model 1, or Douglas DC-1. A revolutionary all-metal twin-engine airliner, the DC-1 soon will give rise to the Douglas DC-2 and the legendary Douglas DC-3.
- September 25 – Lewis Yancey sets an autogyro altitude record of 21,500 ft (6,600 m) in a Pitcairn PCA-2

=== October ===
- October 7 – First flight of the Stipa-Caproni, a prototype aircraft employing Luigi Stipa's "intubed propeller" concept, a forerunner of jet propulsion and the ducted fan for aircraft.
- October 8 – The Indian Air Force is founded as an auxiliary air force of the Indian Empire.
- October 15 – Tata Sons opens an airmail route between Karachi and Madras, the first regular air service within India and origin of Air India.
- October 18 – As French aviator Jean Marmoz takes off from Istres, France, in the Bernard 81 GR to attempt to set a new unrefueled nonstop closed-circuit world distance record, he notices slackness and vibration in the ailerons and large oscillations of the wings. He dumps fuel and aborts the flight.

=== November ===
- November 10 – British Prime Minister Stanley Baldwin states in a speech that "The bomber will always get through."
- November 14–18 – Amy Johnson breaks the United Kingdom-to-Cape Town speed record, shaving 11 hours off Mollison's record set in March. She flies a de Havilland Puss Moth.
- November 19 – A national monument to the Wright Brothers is unveiled in the United States at Kitty Hawk, North Carolina.

=== December ===
- December 1 – Pan American Airways (the future Pan American World Airways) announces plans to offer service to Hawaii.
- December 22 – During the Chaco War, three Bolivian Air Corps aircraft – two Curtiss-Wright CW-14 Osprey and a Curtiss P-6 Hawk – make three bombing and strafing passes against the Paraguayan Navy gunboat ARP Tacuary while she is at anchor in the Paraguay River at Bahía Negra, Paraguay; they drop 15 bombs, 11 of which straddle Tacuary. Tacuary hits one of the CW-14s with a 37 mm (1.46 in) shell, and the CW-14 crashes shortly afterwards in Brazil.
- December 24 – The two Bolivian Air Corps aircraft – a CW-14 Osprey and a P-6 Hawk – that survived the 22 December airstrike against the Paraguayan Navy gunboat ARP Tacuary at Bahía Negra return to attack her there again. This time Tacuary takes evasive action. None of the bombs the two aircraft drop hit Tacuary, but their strafing runs against her wound several of her crewmen. The 22 and 24 December attacks against Tacuary have combined to leave 29 splinter holes and 45 bullet holes in her hull.

== First flights ==
- Arado Ar 66
- Bellanca XSE
- Dewoitine D.560
- Fairchild 24
- Farman F.211
- Focke-Wulf A 43
- Focke-Wulf Fw 43
- IMAM Ro.26
- Mitsubishi Ki-20
- Piaggio P.10
- Pitcairn OP
- Pitcairn PA-18
- Westland-Hill Pterodactyl Mk. V
- Early 1932 – Saro_Percival Mailplane, later redesigned as the Spartan Cruiser
- Late summer – Focke-Wulf Fw 44

=== January ===
- Dewoitine D.481, first variant of the Dewoitine D.480 family to fly.
- January 21 – Dewoitine D.31
- January 29 – De Havilland Fox Moth

=== February ===
- Aichi AB-3
- February 11 – Couzinet 70
- February 16 - Martin Model 123, prototype of the Martin B-10
- February 24 – Latécoère 500

=== March ===
- Junkers Ju 46
- March 7 – Junkers Ju 52/3m
- March 20 – Boeing P-26 Peashooter
- March 25 – Curtiss XF11C-2, prototype of the Curtiss F11C Goshawk, the last Curtiss fighter to go into production for the United States Navy
- March 26 – Consolidated P2Y

=== April ===
- Curtiss XP-23 Hawk, last biplane built for the United States Army Air Corps

=== May ===
- Aichi AB-4
- May 7 – Dornier Do 11
- May 22 – General Aviation GA-43
- May 26 – Farman F.220, prototype of the Farman F.221, Farman F.222, Farman F.223, and SNCAC NC.223

=== June ===
- Boeing-Canada A-213 Totem
- Potez 430, prototype of the Potez 43 family.
- June 3 – RWD-6
- June 6 – Armstrong Whitworth Atalanta
- June 18 – Dewoitine D.500
- June 23 – Dornier Do 12
- June 25 – Farman F.1000

=== July ===
- Abrial A-12 Bagoas
- Curtiss XP-934, later purchased by the United States Army Air Corps as the Curtiss XP-31 Swift, the first monoplane design by Curtiss
- July 8 – Supermarine Scapa

=== August ===
- Farman F.1010
- Fieseler F 4
- Miles M.1 Satyr
- Mitsubishi Ki-1
- August 13 – Gee Bee R-1

=== September ===
- Albatros L102
- Pitcairn PA-19
- September 30 – Blackburn Baffin

=== October ===
- Levasseur PL.15
- October 2 – Dewoitine D.430
- October 7 – Stipa-Caproni
- October 19 – Mitsubishi 3MT5

=== November ===
- November 4 – Beech Staggerwing
- November 8 – Junkers Ju 60
- November 19 – ANF Les Mureau 170C.1
- November 24 – De Havilland Dragon

=== December ===
- Consolidated Y1P-25
- Couzinet 22
- December 1 – Heinkel He 70
- December 21 – Vickers Vincent

== Entered service ==
- Avro 643 Cadet
- Hall PH-1 with United States Navy Patrol Squadron 8 (VP-8)
- Saunders A.7 Severn with No. 209 Squadron, Royal Air Force
- Tupolev TB-3 with the Soviet Air Force

=== February ===
- De Havilland Tiger Moth with the Royal Air Force Central Flying School.
- February 27 – Martin BM with he United States Navy

=== March ===
- March 1 – Berliner-Joyce P-16 (later PB-1) with United States Army Air Corps

=== April ===
- Junkers Ju 46 with Deutsche Luft Hansa

=== September ===
- Curtiss F9C Sparrowhawk aboard USS Akron (ZRS-4)
- September 14 – Boeing Y1B-9A with the 20th and 49th Bombardment Squadrons, 2nd Bomb Group, United States Army Air Corps

=== December ===
- Focke-Wulf Fw 47 with German meteorological stations
- PZL P.7a in the Polish Air Force

== Retirements ==
- Airco DH.9C by Northern Air Lines
- Breguet 14 by the French Army's Aéronautique Militaire.
- Levasseur PL.2 by French Naval Aviation
- Martin T3M by the United States Navy
