= AB2 =

AB2 may refer to:

== Aircraft ==
- Aichi AB-2, a prototype Japanese reconnaissance floatplane of the 1930s
- Bernard AB 2, a planned French biplane aircraft of the 1910s
- Curtiss Model AB-2, an American flying boat designation of the 1910s

== Other uses ==
- Alberta Highway 2, a road in Canada
- AB2, an obsolete designation within the Scottish AB postcode area
- AB2, an axiom about Abelian categories, in mathematics
- AB2, a variant of the Class AB amplifier (see also Linear amplifier § Amplifier classes)
- AB2, a rating within the seaman rank of the UK Navy
- Angry Birds 2, mobile game
