= Junkers W 34 =

1926 airliner family

W 34
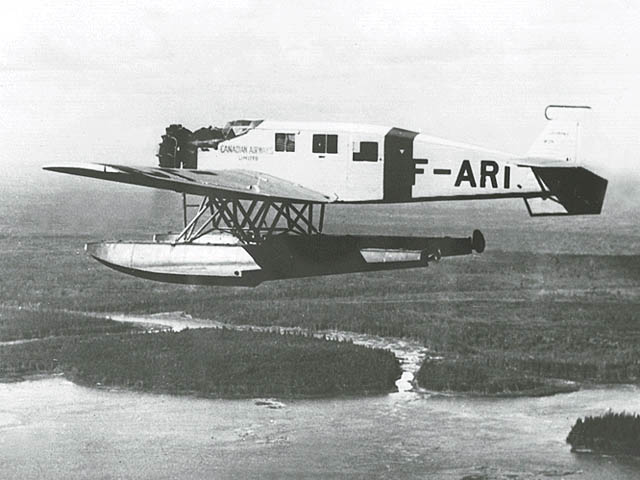
- Canadian Airways CF-ARI

General information
- Type: Transport
- Manufacturer: Junkers
- Designer: Hermann Pohlmann

History
- Introduction date: 1926
- Developed from: Junkers W 33
- Developed into: Junkers Ju 46

The Junkers W 34 was a German-built, single-engine, passenger and transport aircraft. Developed in the 1920s, it was taken into service in 1926. The passenger version could take a pilot and five passengers.

The aircraft was developed from the Junkers W 33, noted for being a record-breaking aircraft. Further development led to the Junkers Ju 46, a catapult-launched seaplane for naval use.

== Production and service ==
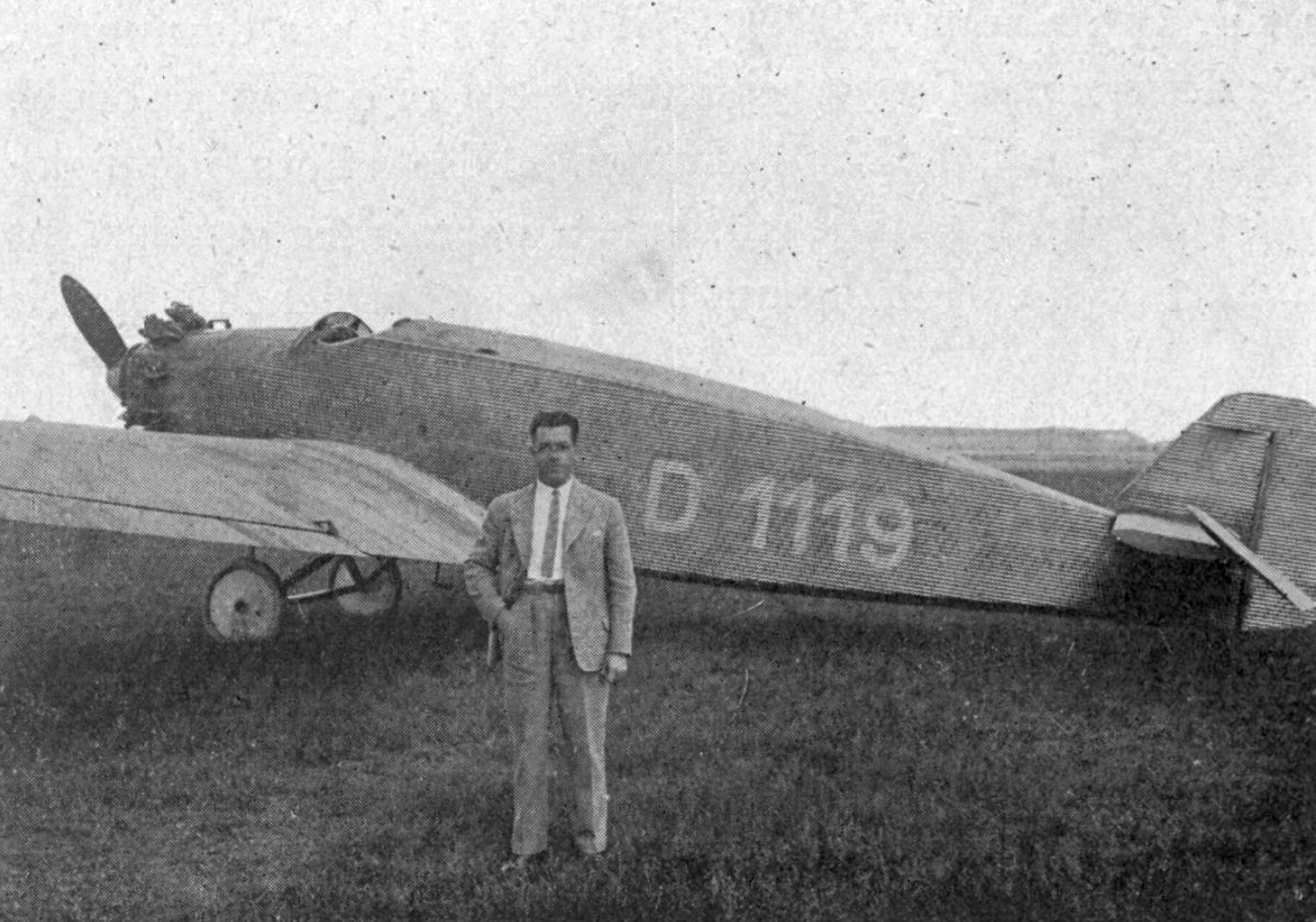
Junkers W 34 in 1929. with Willi Neuenhofen

One Junkers W 34 be/b3e managed to break the then-current altitude record on 26 May 1929 when it reached 12,739 meters (41,795 feet). That aircraft carried the markings D-1119 and it was equipped with a Bristol Jupiter VII engine. The airplane was flown by Willi Neuenhofen.

The Junkers W 34 was manufactured in many different versions. The total production numbers for the civil market were around 1,000, a further 2,024 his and haus were built under license for the RLM and Luftwaffe. The unit price was between RM 65,000 and 70,400.

On 31 January 1944 the Luftwaffe still had 618 W 34hi's and 516 W 34haus in service: the majority were used by flight schools; mainly as navigator and radio operator training (3 or 4 navigator or radio-operator trainees).

The Junkers K.43, nicknamed the "Bush Bomber", was used extensively during the Chaco War (1932–1935) fought between Bolivia and Paraguay. See external links.

The Colombian Air Force used the W 34 and K-43 in the Colombia-Peru War in 1932–3.

The Swedish Air Force operated three W 33/34 between 1933 and 1953 in the transport and air ambulance roles, initially with the military designation Trp 2 and Trp 2A, eventually changed to Tp 2 and Tp 2A. One of these is preserved today in civilian colors as SE-BYA.

In 1930 the Finnish Air Force bought a single W 34 (JU-122) for maritime operations and six K 43s (JU-123 – JU-128) for use as light bombers, during the Continuation War the planes were used as transports, evacuating wounded and supplying Long-Range Recon Patrols behind enemy lines. An additional five W 34s were bought in 1944 for radio navigation training (JU-131 – 135). After the war the Finnish Border Guard operated the remaining planes until 1950.

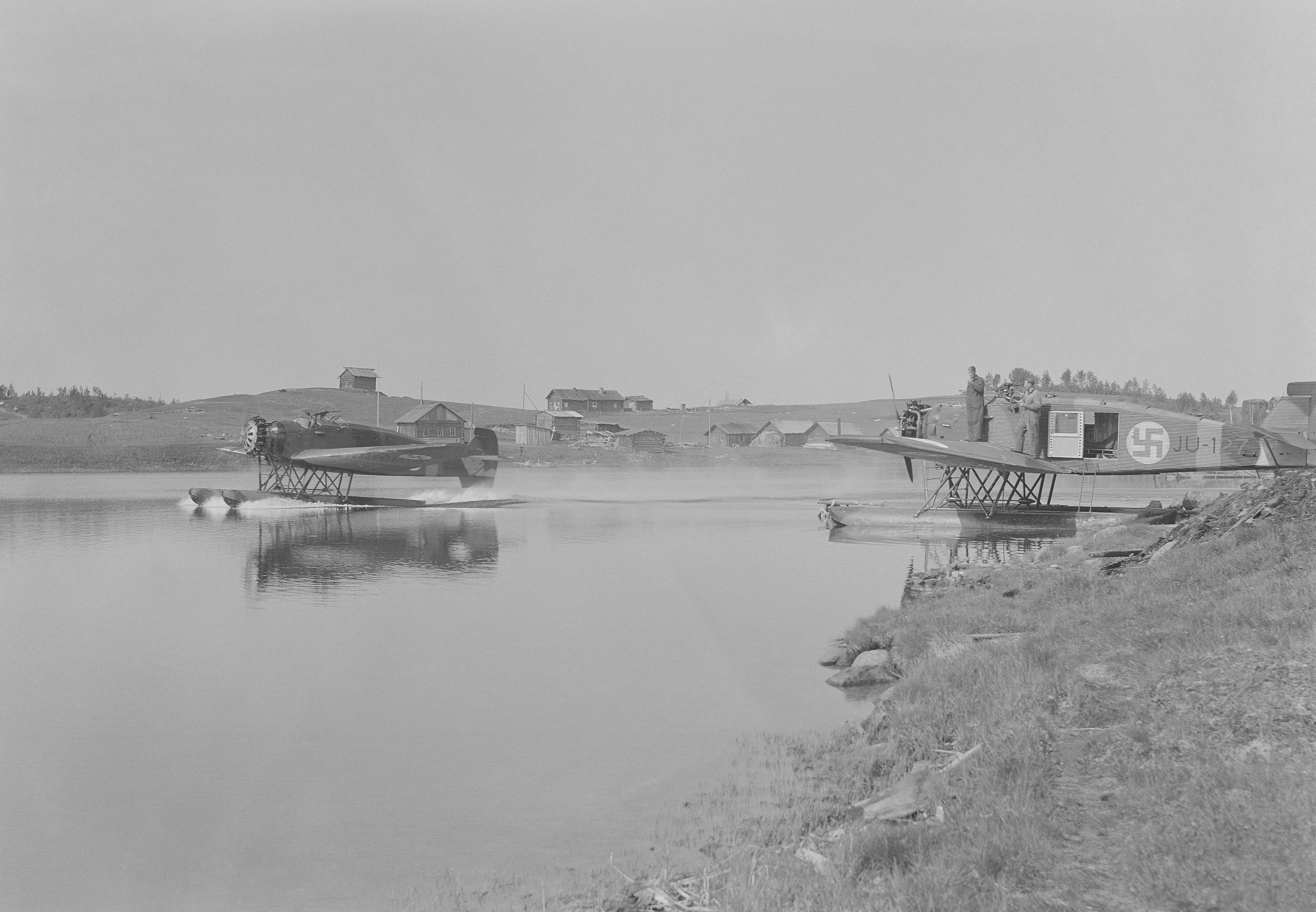
Finnish K 43s in Kiestinki, May 1942

== Production ==
W 34 hi
Junkers (105 aircraft built), Henschel (430), ATG (94), Dornier Wismar (58), HFB (69) and Weser (221).
W 34 hau
Henschel (329), Arado Brandenburg (205), ATG (105), Dornier Wismar (93), HFB (192) and MIAG Braunschweig (73).

== Variants ==
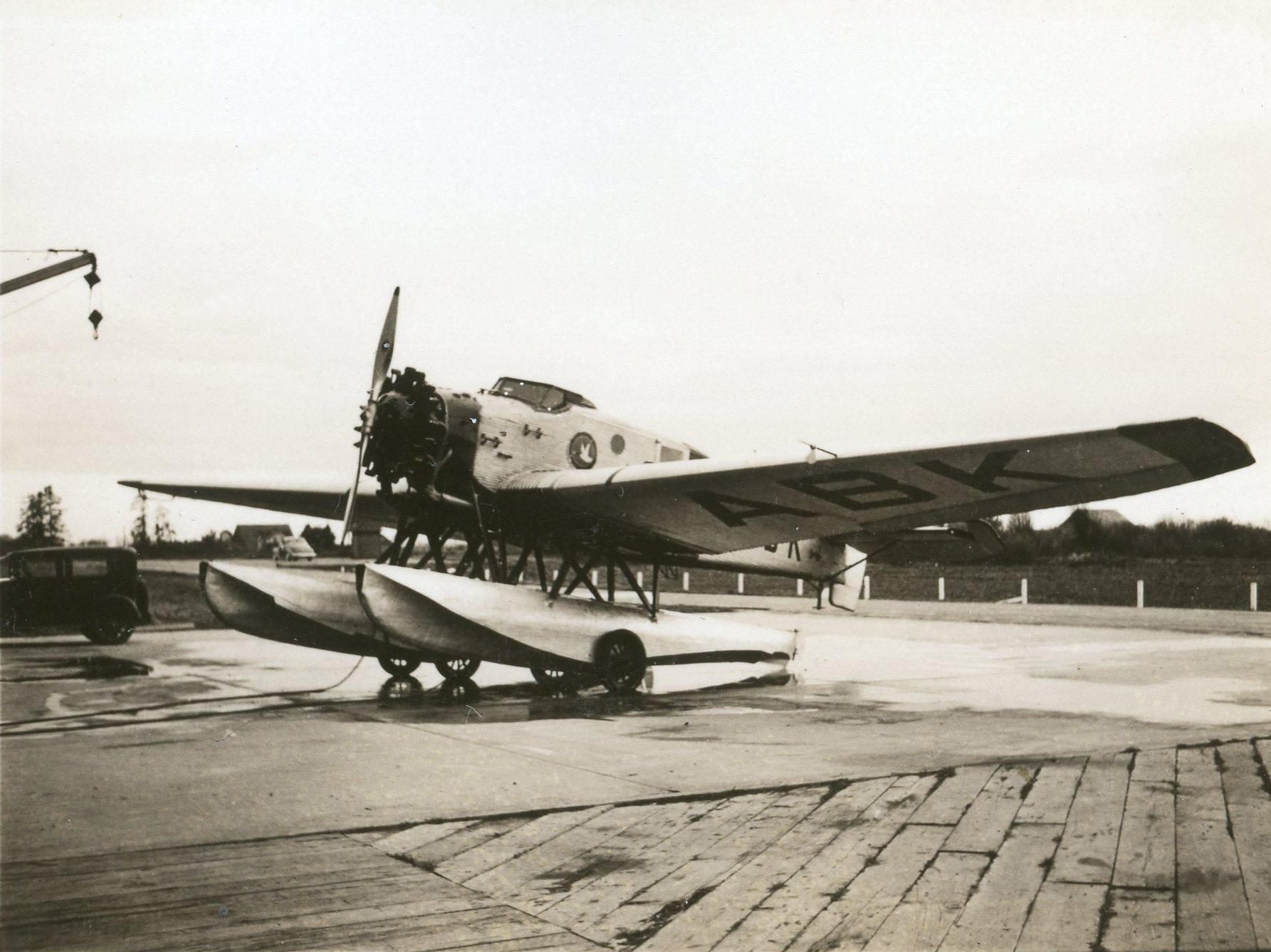
W 34 of Canadian Airways, floatplane version

W 34 a
331 kW Gnome et Rhône 9A Jupiter engine, speed: 190 km/h, wingspan: 17.75 m and length 11.10 m
W 34 be
375 kW Gnome et Rhône 9A Jupiter engine, speed: 230 km/h, wingspan: 17.75 m, length: 10.70 m
W 34 be/b3e
441 kW Bristol Jupiter VII engine and was used for attempts to try breaking the world altitude record
W 34 ci
405 kW Pratt & Whitney Hornet engine, speed: 245 km/h, equipped with cabin windows
W 34 di
like the W 34 ci, the engine was license produced by BMW.
W 34 f
331 kW Gnome et Rhône 9A Jupiter engine, speed 190 km/h, wingspan 18.48 m, length 11.10 m, enclosed cockpit, ailerons were lengthened; the export version had a cargo door
W 34 f
experimental aircraft with floats
W 34 fa
passenger aircraft for export
W 34 fä
export aircraft
W 34 fo
export aircraft with a Pratt & Whitney R-1340 engine
W 34 fy
Armstrong Siddeley Panther engine
W 34 fao
397 kW Siemens-Halske Sh 20 engine, only one was produced for tests with autopilot
W 34 fei
441 kW Siemens-Halske Sh 20U engine, only one was produced as a maritime test aircraft
W 34 fg
Armstrong Siddeley Jaguar Major engine
W 34 fue
Pratt & Whitney Hornet engine, later rebuilt as a maritime aircraft.
W 34 fi
Pratt & Whitney or BMW built 405 kW Hornet; wingspan: 18.48 m, length 10.27 m, speed 260 km/h. The aircraft had an enclosed cockpit and low-pressure tires.
W 34 gi
405 kW BMW Hornet, only one machine was produced in 1933 for tests
W 34 hi
485 kW BMW 132A/E, the aircraft could take six passengers and was equipped with improved radio- and direction finders. This version was mostly used by Luftwaffe to train pilots and radio operators.
W 34 hau
similar to hi, but it had a 526 kW Bramo 322 H engine. The type was mostly used by Luftwaffe to train its pilots and radio operators.
K 43
Military W34, available in many of the above-mentioned versions.

== Operators ==
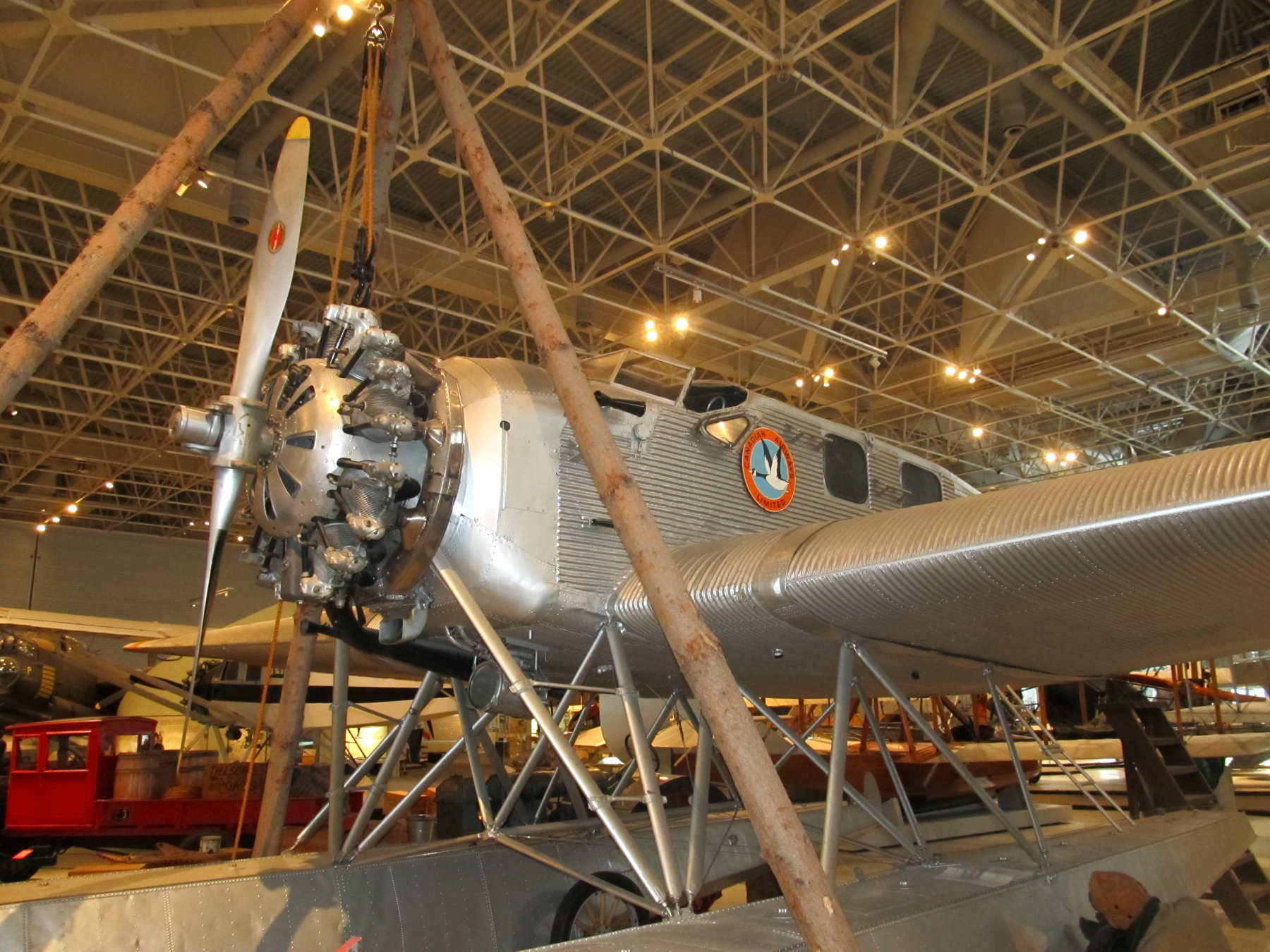
Junkers W 34 f/fi in Canada Aviation and Space Museum

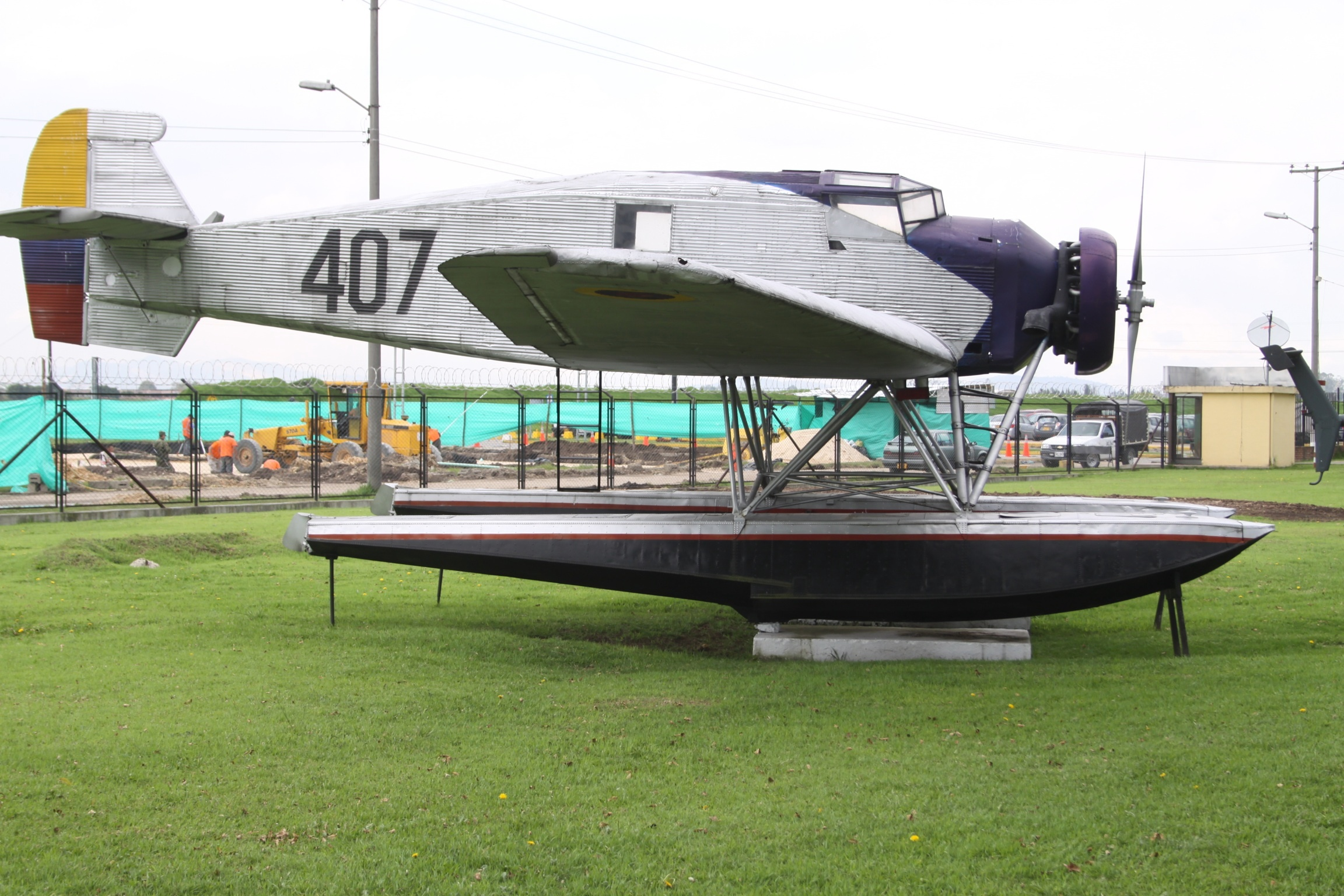
Junkers W34h of the Colombian Air Force now on display

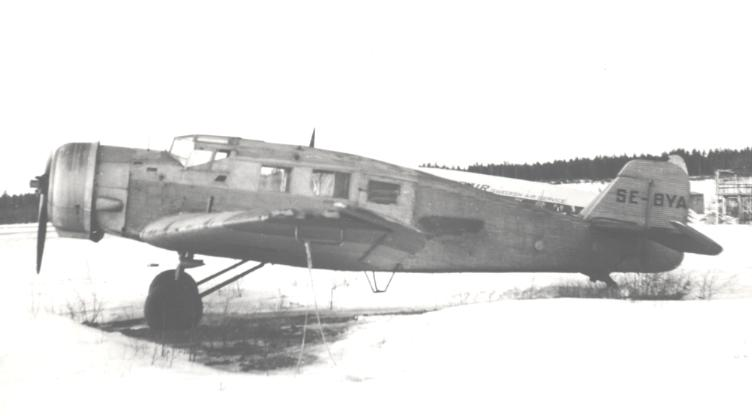
Swedish Junkers W 34 SE-BYA was flown by the Swedish Air Force 1933–1953 as the Trp 2A and Tp 2A ambulance aircraft. Stockholm Arlanda March 1968.

Argentina

- Argentine Air Force
- Argentine Naval Aviation – 1 W34 purchased in 1934, used as trainer

Australia

- Guinea Airways
- Royal Australian Air Force

Bolivia

- Bolivian Air Force

Brazil

- Syndicato Condor – Serviços Aéreos Condor

Bulgaria

- Bulgarian Air Force

Canada

- Royal Canadian Air Force
- Canadian Airways

Chile

- Chilean Air Force

China

- Chinese Nationalist Air Force

Colombia

- Colombian Air Force
- SCADTA(Avianca)

Independent State of Croatia

- Zrakoplovstvo Nezavisne Države Hrvatske

Czechoslovakia

- Czechoslovak Air Force

Finland

- Finnish Air Force
- Finnish Border Guard

Germany

- Luftwaffe

Norway

- Royal Norwegian Air Force

Papua New Guinea
Portugal

- Portuguese Army Aviation (Aeronáutica Militar) operated W 34L aircraft.
- Forças Aéreas da Armada operated K 43W aircraft.

Romania

- Royal Romanian Air Force operated 10 W 34 hi aircraft.

Slovakia

- Slovak Air Force (1939–1945)

(Spain) Spanish State

- Spanish Air Force

Sweden

- Swedish Air Force

South Africa

- South African Airways operated 2 aircraft.
- South African Air Force

Venezuela

- Venezuelan Air Force

== Accidents and incidents ==
- 3 May 1934: a Syndicato Condor Junkers W-34, registration PP-CAR, crashed on landing at Rio de Janeiro, Brazil. Two crew members died. The plane was repaired and later suffered a second accident in 1944.
- 24 February 1941: a Junkers W-34 operated by the Luftwaffe crashed shortly after takeoff from Paris-Le Bourget Airport, France. The passenger, Vice Admiral Lothar von Arnauld de la Perière, was killed; the three crew members were injured.
- 24 February 1942: a Syndicato Condor Junkers W-34, registration P-BAOA/PP-CAO, crashed while attempting an emergency landing at Riachão, Maranhão. Two crew members died.
- 16 April 1944: PP-CAR, the same Junkers W-34 involved in the 1934 accident, this time operating for Cruzeiro do Sul, crashed during an emergency landing at Rio de Janeiro Santos Dumont Airport. Two crew members died.

== Specifications (W 34he landplane) ==
Data from Die Deutsche Luftrüstung 1933–1945 Vol.3 – Flugzeugtypen Henschel-Messerschmitt, Junkers aircraft and engines, 1913-1945, German aircraft of the Second World War, German Combat Aircraft

General characteristics

- Crew: 2
- Capacity: 6 passengers
- Length: 10.27 m (33 ft 8 in)
- Wingspan: 18.48 m (60 ft 8 in)
- Height: 3.53 m (11 ft 7 in)
- Wing area: 44 m^{2} (470 sq ft)
- Empty weight: 1,700 kg (3,748 lb)
- Gross weight: 3,200 kg (7,055 lb)
- Fuel capacity: 477 L (126 US gal; 105 imp gal)
- Powerplant: 1 × BMW 132A 9-cylinder air-cooled radial piston engine, 480 kW (650 hp) (660 PS)
- Propellers: 2-bladed metal fixed-pitch propeller, 3.1 m (10 ft 2 in) diameter

Performance

- Maximum speed: 265 km/h (165 mph, 143 kn) at sea level
- Cruise speed: 233 km/h (145 mph, 126 kn)
- Landing speed: 116 km/h (72 mph; 63 kn)
- Range: 900 km (560 mi, 490 nmi)
- Service ceiling: 6,300 m (20,700 ft)
- Rate of climb: 5.25 m/s (1,033 ft/min)
- Time to altitude: 1,000 m (3,300 ft) in 3 minute 12 seconds

Armament

- 2 x 7.92 mm (0.312 in) machine guns (dorsal) and 1 x 7.92 mm (0.312 in) machine gun (ventral)
- 6 x 50 kg (110 lb) bombs (300 Kg total)

== Bibliography ==
- Munson, Kenneth (1978). German Aircraft Of World War 2 in colour. Poole, Dorset, UK: Blandford Press. ISBN 0-7137-0860-3.
