= Junkers Ju 46 =

1932 mail plane

Ju 46
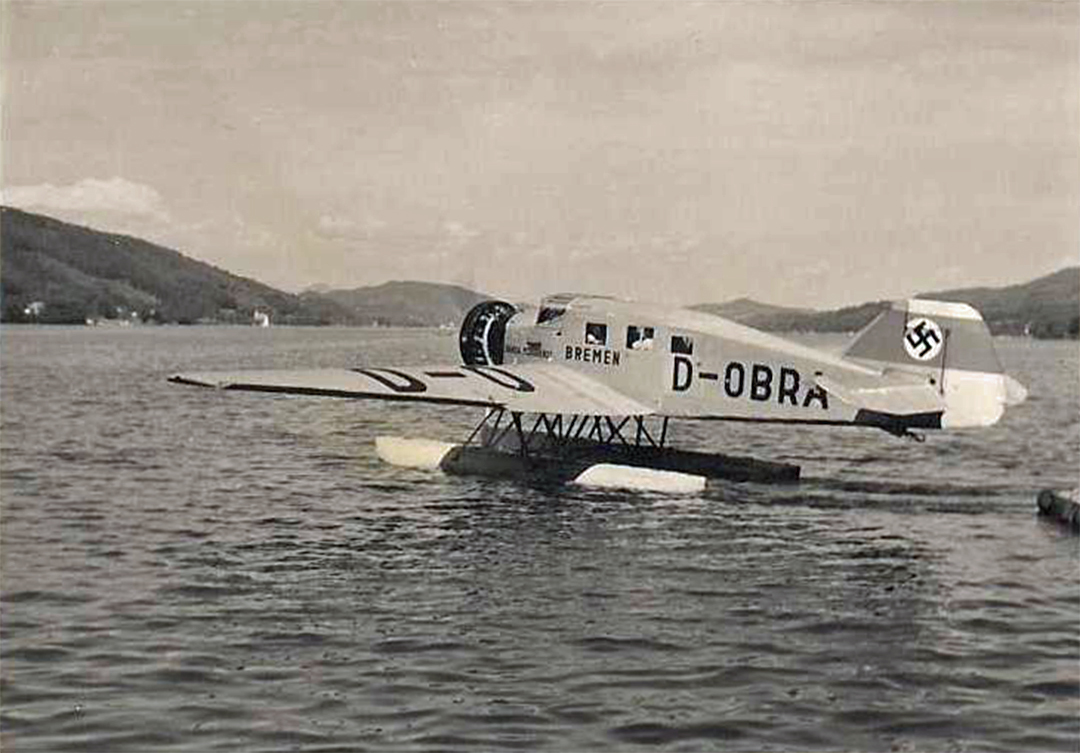

General information
- Type: Mail plane
- Manufacturer: Junkers
- Designer: Ernst Zindel, Hermann Pohlmann
- Primary user: Luft Hansa
- Number built: 5

History
- Introduction date: April 1932
- First flight: March 1932
- Developed from: Junkers W 34

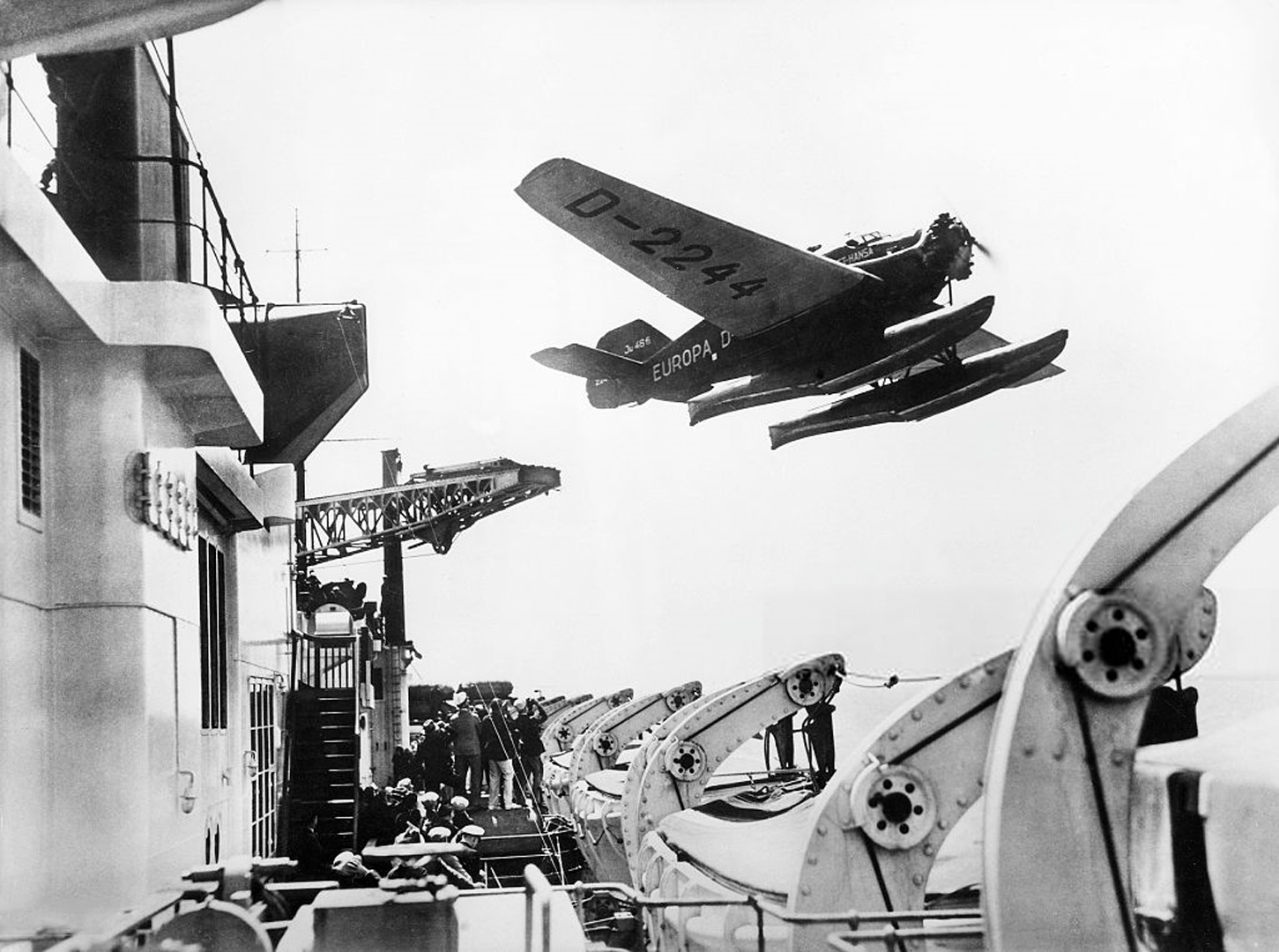
A Ju 46 launched from a ship by catapult (1932)

The Junkers Ju 46 was a German shipborne catapult-launched seaplane derivative of the W 34, constructed for pre-war Luft Hansa's mail service over the Atlantic Ocean. The first production models were delivered in 1932 and replaced the Heinkel He 58, which, along with the He 12, had pioneered these ship-to-shore mail delivery flights.

== Design and development ==
The Ju 46 was a strengthened version of the Junkers W 34, modified for catapult launches. It was externally almost identical to the W 34 apart from a revised vertical tail. Compared to the W 34, this carried a broader-chord rudder with a more rounded trailing edge and a noticeably squared-off top. This revision improved control of the aircraft during the low-speed launch. The ship to shore aircraft were all seaplanes (floatplanes), though some Ju 46 were used with a fixed wheeled undercarriage and tail-skid at times in their careers. The aircraft was equipped with a 441 kW (591 hp) BMW-C radial engine. A total of five aircraft were supplied, according to rebuilt civil registers, though other sources claim four. They were later equipped with more powerful BMW-E engines.

== Operational history ==
The aircraft was used in the postal link service across the Atlantic Ocean and were based on board the NDL-liners SS Bremen and Europa. Each aircraft was associated with its ship and bore its name. The first Bremen and Europa were both Ju 46fi seaplane variants and went into use in 1932. Two (or three) more, Ju 46hi variants, joined them in mid-1933, one having started life as a landplane.

Both ships had been fitted with compressed air-driven catapults for this purpose. These catapults accelerated the 3,200 kg (7,050 lb) aircraft to a speed of 110 km/h (70 mph) at a distance of just 20 m (65 ft). The launch of these aircraft, painted bright red for easy spotting by rescue planes in case of emergency landings at sea, was always a special experience for the passengers. The launch at a distance of about 1,200 km (750 mi) from the destination allowed to land the mail some 24 hours ahead of the mother ship's docking. On Westbound crossings, they flew to New York; Eastbound to Southampton, where they refuelled and went on to Bremen. These activities were limited by weather to the summer months, beginning in April 1932.

After the end of their Luft Hansa service two of the Ju 46s flew with the Brazilian airline Syndicato Condor.

== Operators ==
Brazil

- Syndicato Condor - Serviços Aéreos Condor

Germany

- Luft Hansa in cooperation with shipping line Norddeutscher Lloyd

== Specifications (Ju-46hi) ==
Data from Junkers an aircraft album no.3, histaviation.com : Junkers Ju 46

General characteristics

- Crew: 2
- Length: 11.06 m (36 ft 3 in)
- Wingspan: 17.8 m (58 ft 5 in)
- Height: 3.9 m (12 ft 10 in)
- Wing area: 46 m^{2} (500 sq ft)
- Airfoil: Göttingen 256
- Empty weight: 1,980 kg (4,365 lb)
- Max takeoff weight: 3,200 kg (7,055 lb)
- Powerplant: 1 × BMW 132E 9-cylinder air-cooled radial piston engine, 485 kW (650 hp)
- Propellers: 2-bladed fixed-pitch propeller (ground adjustable?)

Performance

- Maximum speed: 230 km/h (140 mph, 120 kn)
- Cruise speed: 200 km/h (120 mph, 110 kn)
- Alighting speed: 115 km/h (71 mph; 62 kn)
- Range: 1,700 km (1,100 mi, 920 nmi)
- Service ceiling: 4,240 m (13,900 ft)
- Time to altitude: 1,000 m (3,300 ft) in 3 minutes 24 seconds
- Wing loading: 72.8 kg/m^{2} (14.9 lb/sq ft)
- Power/mass: 0.1516 kW/kg (0.0922 hp/lb)
