= Curtiss XP-31 Swift =

American fighter prototype

XP-31 Swift
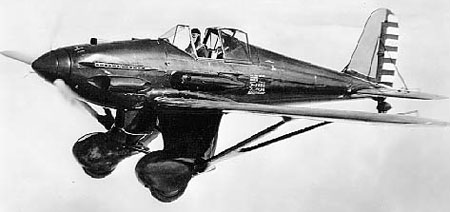
- Curtiss XP-31 with Vee engine

General information
- Type: Experimental monoplane fighter
- Manufacturer: Curtiss
- Primary user: United States Army Air Corps
- Number built: 1

History
- Introduction date: 1933
- First flight: July 1932

The Curtiss XP-31 Swift (Wright Field Project Number XP-934) was a 1930s American experimental monoplane fighter built by Curtiss for the United States Army Air Corps.

The XP-31 featured the first enclosed cockpit on a U.S. pursuit aircraft and was also the last pursuit aircraft to have fixed landing gear and externally braced wings. Despite its innovations, the XP-31 did not offer any advantages compared to its rival the Boeing P-26 Peashooter and was not ordered into series production.

== Design and development ==
Curtiss offered the XP-31 (given the Wright Field Project Number XP-934) in a 1932 competition with the P-26. It was a low-wing monoplane with fixed landing gear, first flown in July. It was the AAC's first single-seat closed-cockpit fighter, and the last with fixed gear and wing struts. Despite its small size, it was badly overweight, and carried 125 gallons (104 imp gal, 474 L) of fuel. Although Curtiss considered the design significant in that it introduced various new technologies, compared to its contemporaries the XP-31 was already outmoded, and, more importantly, testing showed that it fell below performance expectations.

== Testing and evaluation ==
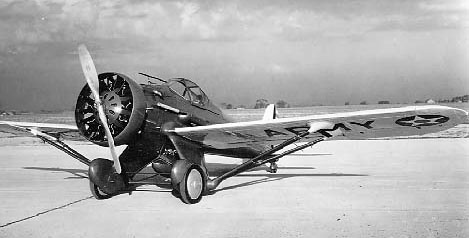
The Curtiss XP-934 in its original radial engine configuration

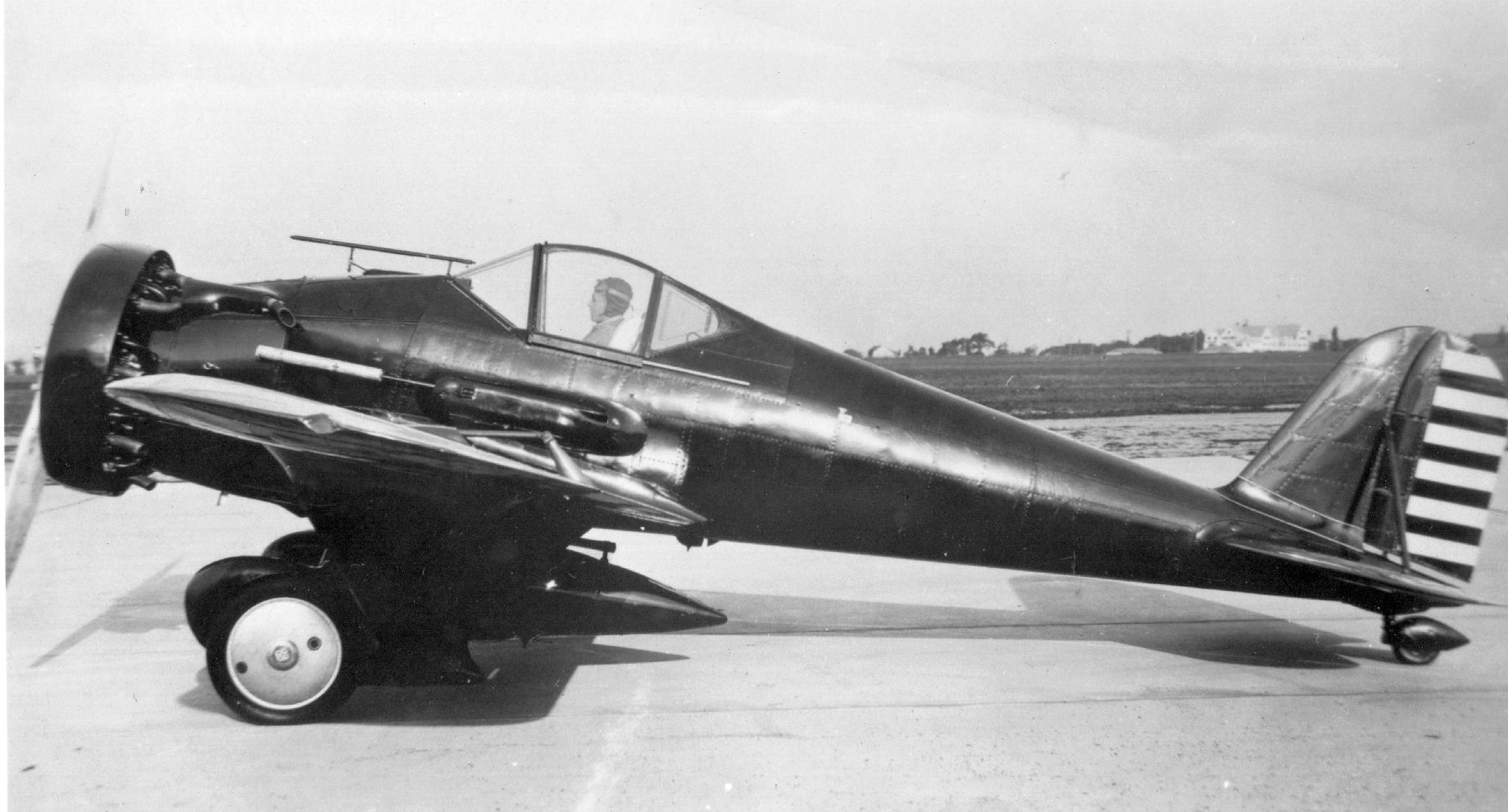
Side view of the XP-31's original configuration

Powered by a 700 hp (520 kW) R-1750 Cyclone radial, its performance was dismal, despite retractable leading edge slots and large trailing-edge flaps, so a 600 hp (450 kW) Curtiss V-1570 Conqueror was substituted. In this form, the Curtiss XP-31 Swift (s/n 33-178) was delivered on 1 March 1933, having already lost to the P-26. The sole example was scrapped in 1935.

== Operators ==
United States

- United States Army Air Corps

== Specifications ==
Data from U.S. Fighters: Army-Air Force 1925 to 1980s and Fighters of the United States Air Force

General characteristics

- Crew: one pilot
- Length: 26 ft 3 in (8.0 m)
- Wingspan: 36 ft 0 in (11 m)
- Height: 7 ft 9 in (2.4 m)
- Wing area: 203 sq ft (18.86 m^{2})
- Empty weight: 3,334 lb (1,512 kg)
- Gross weight: 4,143 lb (1,879 kg)
- Powerplant: 1 × Curtiss V-1570 Conqueror water-cooled 12-cylinder vee engine , 600 hp (450 kW)

Performance

- Maximum speed: 208 mph (335 km/h, 181 kn)
- Range: 370 mi (595 km, 320 nmi)
- Service ceiling: 24,400 ft (7,437 m)

Armament

- 2 × fixed, forward-firing .30 in (7.62 mm) M1919 Browning machine guns in cowl
- 2 × fixed, forward-firing .30 in (7.62 mm) M1919 Browning machine guns in cheeks

Aircraft of comparable role, configuration, and era

- Boeing P-26 Peashooter

Related lists

- List of military aircraft of the United States
