= Aichi AC-1 =

1920s Japanese piston aircraft engine prototype

AC-1
- Type: Radial aircraft engine
- National origin: Japan
- Manufacturer: Aichi Kokuki
- First run: 1929
- Major applications: Aichi AB-2

The Aichi AC-1 was an experimental 250 kW (330 hp) nine-cylinder air-cooled radial engine. In 1929, it was used to power the newly designed Aichi AB-2, a catapult-launched reconnaissance seaplane.

The AB-2 with its AC-1 engine is noted for being the first shipboard reconnaissance seaplane and engine combination designed and manufactured entirely in Japan, without foreign assistance. This was a major turning point, not only for Aichi, but for all of the other Japanese aircraft and engine manufacturers, as they no longer need rely on foreign designs.

None of these engines survive today, and little is known about them.

== Specifications ==
=== General characteristics ===
- Type: Nine-cylinder, air-cooled, radial aircraft piston engine

=== Components ===
- Valvetrain: Two overhead valves per cylinder
- Supercharger: gear driven single-speed centrifugal
- Fuel system: Carburetor
- Oil system: Dry sump with scavenging pump and pressure pump
- Cooling system: Air-cooled
