= Focke-Wulf Fw 43 Falke =

Light utility aircraft

A 43 Falke

General information
- Type: Civil utility aircraft
- Manufacturer: Focke-Wulf
- Number built: 1

History
- First flight: 1932

The Focke-Wulf A 43 Falke (Falcon) was a light utility aircraft developed in Germany in 1932. The last project undertaken by the company under the technical direction of Henrich Focke, was a high-wing strut-braced monoplane of conventional design, with a fixed tailwheel undercarriage. The pilot and two passengers sat in a fully enclosed cabin. Only a single example was built. In 1932, it was the fastest airliner in Europe.

== Specifications ==
General characteristics

- Crew: one, pilot
- Capacity: two passengers
- Length: 8.30 m (27 ft 3 in)
- Wingspan: 10.00 m (32 ft 10 in)
- Height: 2.30 m (7 ft 7 in)
- Wing area: 14.0 m^{2} (151 sq ft)
- Empty weight: 725 kg (1,600 lb)
- Gross weight: 1,125 kg (2,480 lb)
- Powerplant: 1 × Argus As 10c , 164 kW (220 hp)

Performance

- Maximum speed: 256 km/h (158 mph, 137 kn)
- Range: 1,050 km (652 mi, 567 nmi)
- Service ceiling: 5,100 m (16,730 ft)
