= Aichi AB-2 =

Prototype reconnaissance floatplane

AB-2
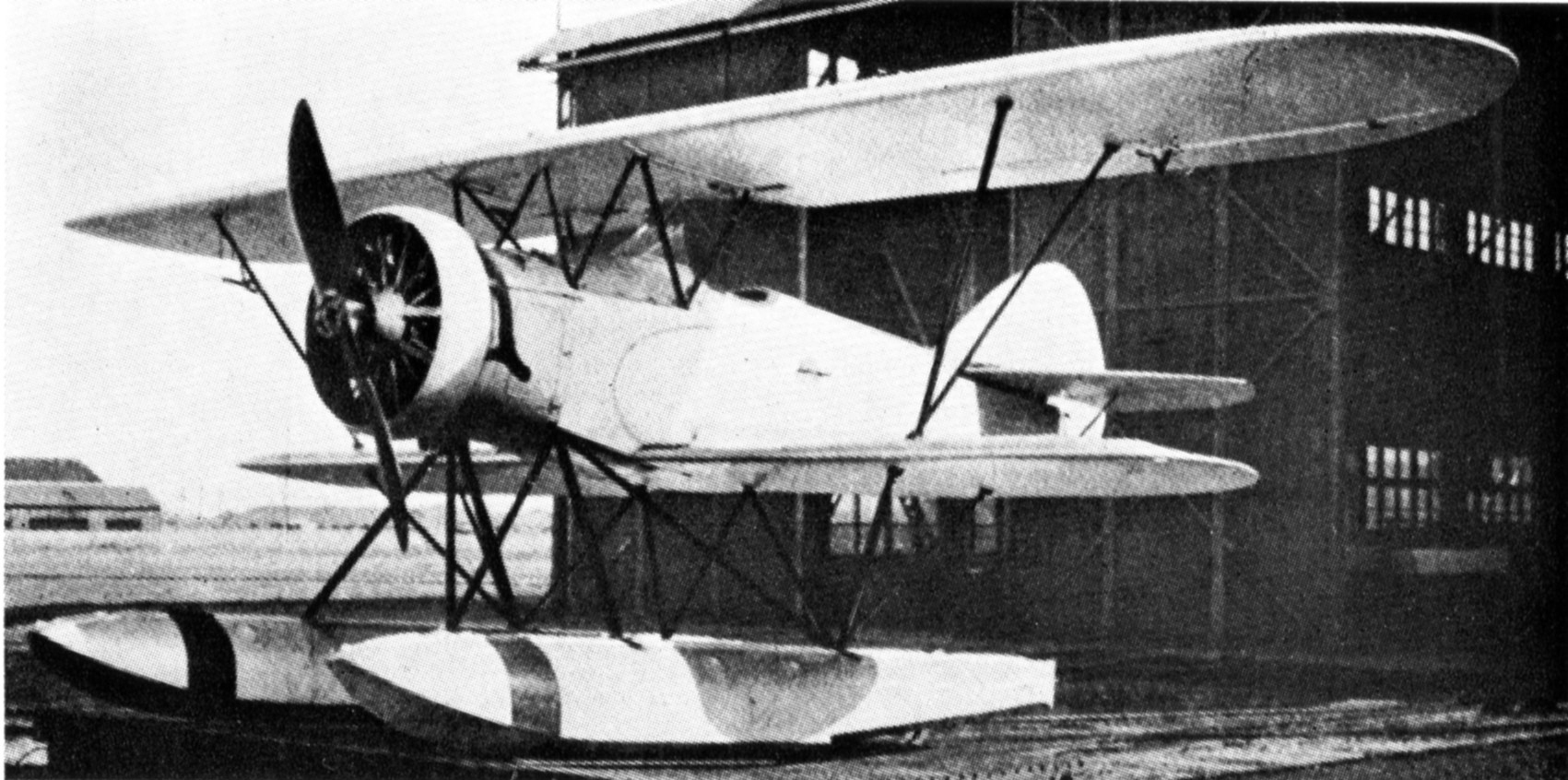

General information
- Type: Reconnaissance floatplane
- National origin: Japan
- Manufacturer: Aichi
- Designer: Tetsuo Miki
- Number built: 2

History
- First flight: 1930
- Variant: Aichi AB-3

The Aichi AB-2 was a prototype Japanese reconnaissance floatplane of the 1930s. It was a single-engined biplane, of which two examples were built, but no production followed.

== Design and development ==
In 1929, Tetsuo Miki, a designer at Aichi Tokei Denki Kabushiki Kaisha (Aichi Watch and Electrical Machinery Company) started the design of a catapult launched reconnaissance floatplane with the aim of replacing the Nakajima E2N aboard the Imperial Japanese Navy's warships. Miki's design was a small single-engined biplane. Its fuselage was of steel tube construction with fabric covering, while it had wooden wings that folded to the rear for storage aboard ship. Powerplant was a 330 hp (246 kW) Aichi AC-1, an experimental radial engine. The two-man crew sat in open cockpits, while the aircraft's undercarriage consisted of twin floats.

The two prototypes were completed and flown in 1930. The AC-1 engine was not successful, however, and the project was abandoned after one of the prototypes was destroyed when an exhaust fire spread to the fuselage. The type did form the basis of the later Aichi AB-3 floatplane, of which a single example was built in 1932 for China.

== Specifications ==
Data from Japanese Aircraft 1910–1941

General characteristics

- Crew: 2
- Length: 8.24 m (27 ft 0 in)
- Wingspan: 11 m (36 ft 1 in)
- Height: 3.446 m (11 ft 4 in)
- Wing area: 36 m^{2} (390 sq ft)
- Empty weight: 1,115 kg (2,458 lb)
- Gross weight: 1,656 kg (3,651 lb)
- Powerplant: 1 × Aichi AC-1 9-cylinder air-cooled radial engine, 250 kW (330 hp)

Performance

- Maximum speed: 180.4 km/h (112.1 mph, 97.4 kn)
- Cruise speed: 130 km/h (81 mph, 70 kn)
- Stall speed: 71.9 km/h (44.7 mph, 38.8 kn)
- Endurance: 5.9 hr
- Time to altitude: 3,000 m (9,840 ft) in 20 min

Armament

- Guns: 1× fixed forward-firing 7.7 mm (0.30 in) machine gun and 1 machine gun in rear cockpit
- Bombs: 2× 30 kg (66 lb) bombs

== See also ==
Related lists

- List of flying boats and floatplanes
