= Aichi AB-3 =

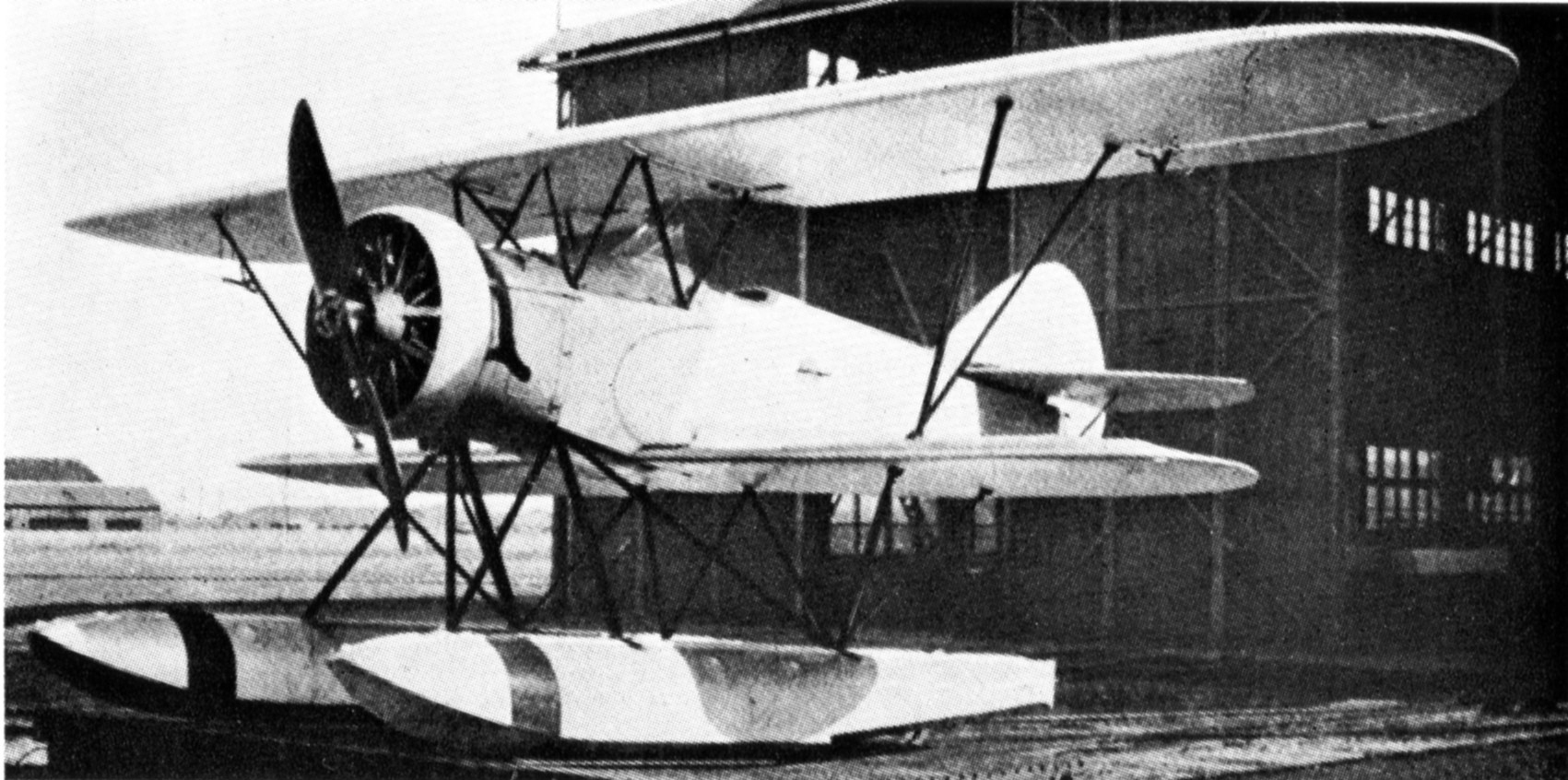

General information
- Type: Reconnaissance floatplane
- National origin: Japan
- Manufacturer: Aichi
- Designer: Tetsuo Miki
- Primary user: China
- Number built: 1

History
- First flight: 1932
- Developed from: Aichi AB-2

The Aichi AB-3 was a Japanese ship-board reconnaissance floatplane of the 1930s. The AB-3, a single-seat, single-engined biplane, was designed to equip a light cruiser Ning Hai being built in Japan for the Chinese navy, a single aircraft being accepted by the Chinese.

== Development and design ==
In 1928, the Republic of China Navy, keen to modernise its obsolete fleet, placed orders for a class of two light cruisers, the Ning Hai class, to be designed in Japan, with the lead ship to be built at the Harima shipyard in Japan, and the second ship, with Japanese help, in China. The ships were designed to carry two small seaplanes each, with a small hangar being provided for a folded aircraft, and the Japanese Navy placed an order with Aichi for a single seat floatplane to equip these ships.

Aichi's designer, Tetsuo Miki based his design on his Aichi AB-2 two seat floatplane which was under design for the Imperial Japanese Navy, producing a small single-seat biplane of mixed wood and metal construction with single-bay wings, powered by a 130 hp (97 kW) Gasuden Jimpu radial engine. It had twin floats, and had detachable wings to aid storage aboard ship. The prototype AB-3 was completed in January 1932, and when flown for the first time in February that year proved to have excellent performance, exceeding the specification in all ways.

== Operational history ==
The prototype was accepted by the Chinese navy, but no further production ensued, the Chinese instead building a similar aircraft of local design, the Naval Air Establishment Ning Hai, powered by the same engine that powered the AB-3.

== Specifications (AB-3) ==
Data from Japanese Aircraft 1910-1941

General characteristics

- Crew: 1
- Length: 6.6 m (21 ft 8 in)
- Wingspan: 9 m (29 ft 6 in)
- Height: 2.88 m (9 ft 5 in)
- Wing area: 19.5 m^{2} (210 sq ft)
- Empty weight: 575 kg (1,268 lb)
- Gross weight: 790 kg (1,742 lb)
- Powerplant: 1 × Gasuden Jimpu seven-cylinder radial engine, 97 kW (130 hp)

Performance

- Maximum speed: 194 km/h (121 mph, 105 kn) at sea level
- Cruise speed: 137 km/h (85 mph, 74 kn) at 500 m (1,640 ft)
- Range: 702 km (436 mi, 379 nmi)
- Service ceiling: 4,300 m (14,100 ft)
- Time to altitude: Climb to 3,000 m (9,840 ft):15 min 40 s

Armament

- None
