= History of Iberia =

History of Iberia may refer to:

- History of Iberia (airline), Spanish airline
- History of the Iberian Peninsula, peninsula in the Southwest corner of Europe
- History of the Kingdom of Iberia (302 BC–580 AD), an ancient Georgian kingdom
- History of Sasanian Iberia (523–626/627), the eastern parts of Caucasian Georgia under direct Sasanian rule
- History of the Principality of Iberia (580–880 AD), an aristocratic regime in early medieval Caucasian Georgia
