= CLASSA =

Spanish airline, 1929–1933

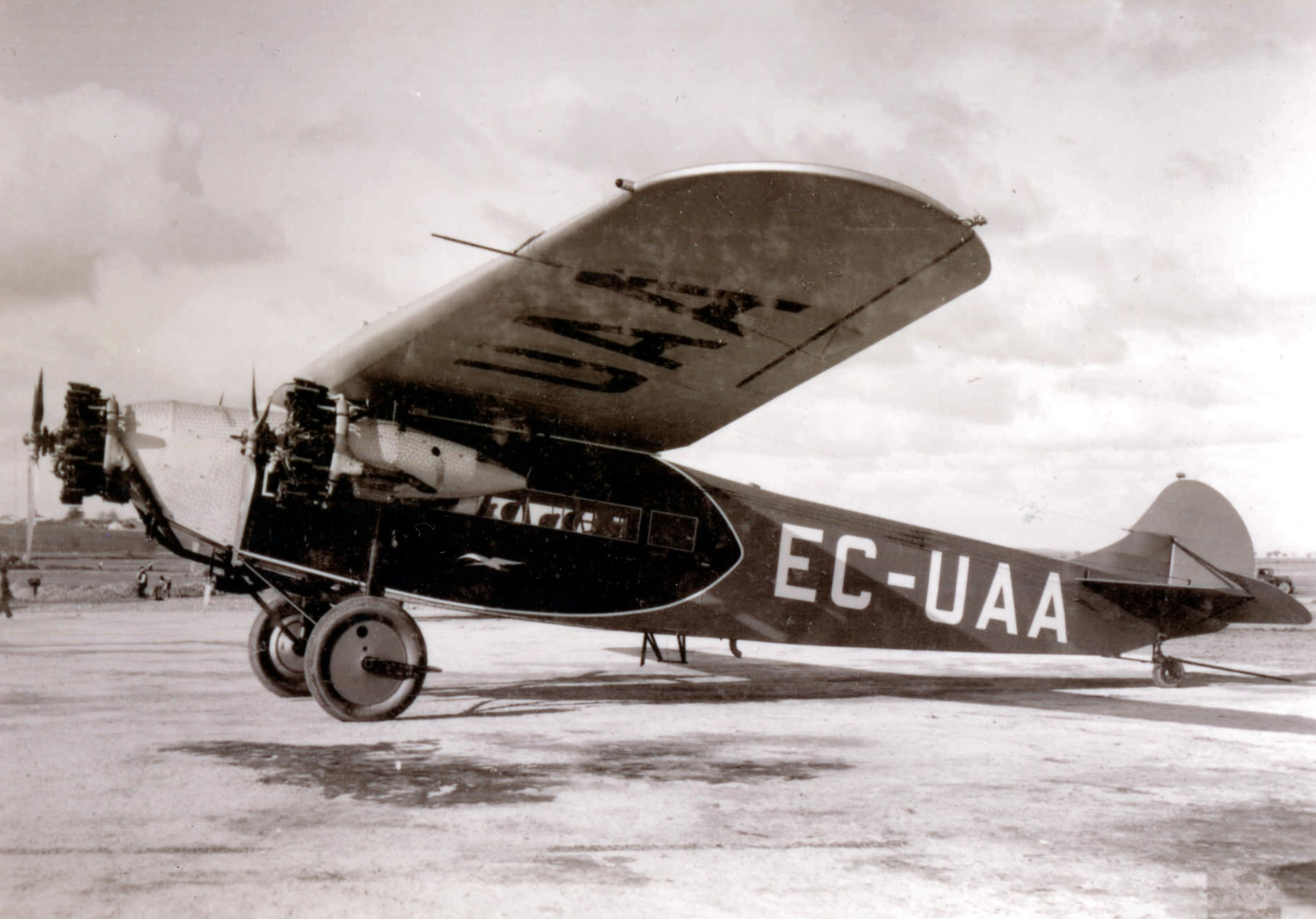
- CLASSA Fokker F.VIIb/3m
IATA	ICAO	Call sign
-	-	CLASSA
- Founded: March 13, 1929; Madrid, Spain
- Commenced operations: 25 November 1929
- Ceased operations: 1933
- Operating bases: Getafe Airport; Barcelona Airport; Sevilla Airport
- Fleet size: 8 aircraft
- Headquarters: Madrid, Spain

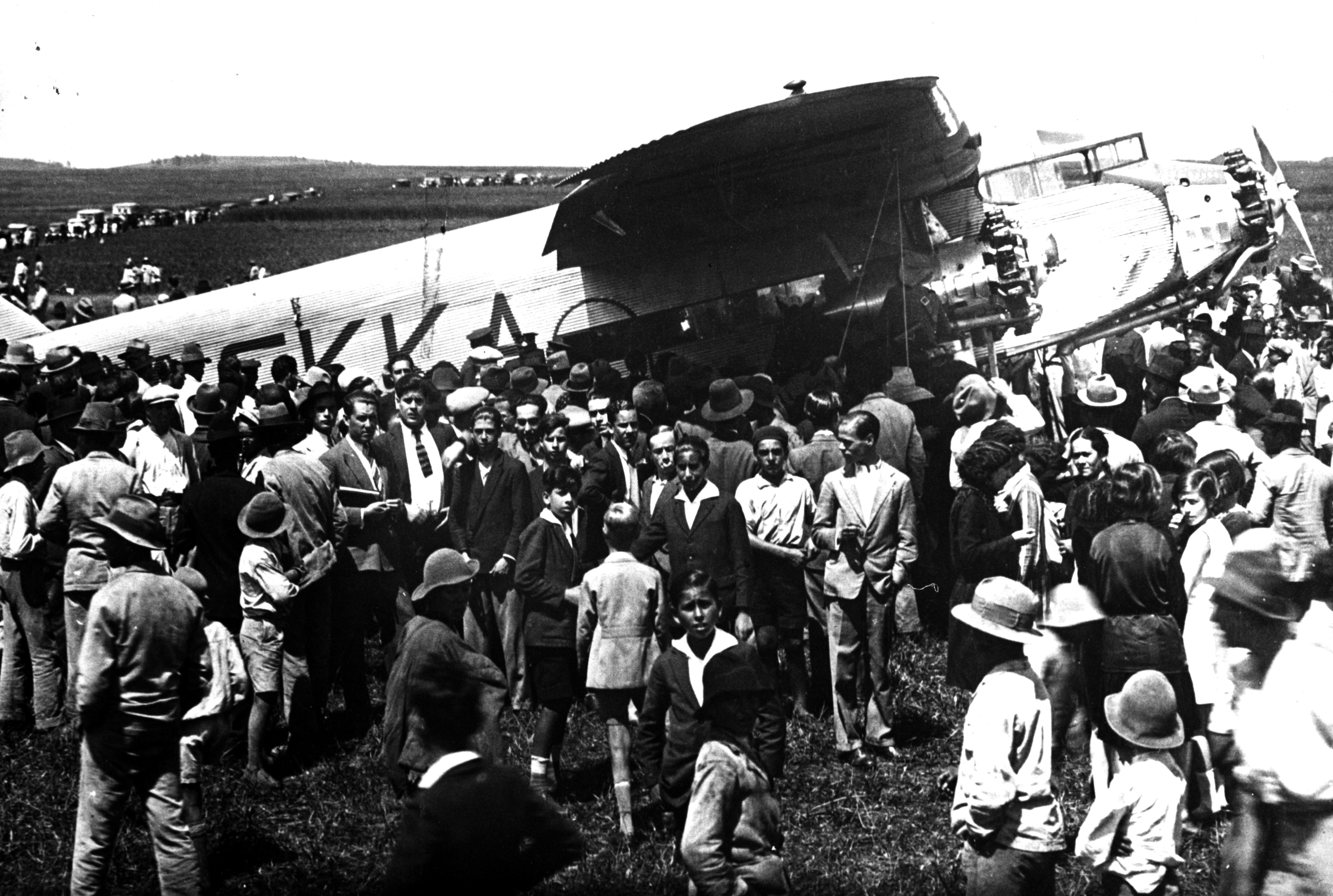
The historic first commercial flight between Peninsular Spain and the Canary Islands by a CLASSA Ford 4 AT trimotor on May 20, 1930

Concesionaria de Líneas Aéreas Subvencionadas, meaning 'Concessionaire of Subsidized Airlines', mostly known as CLASSA, was a Spanish airline based in Madrid, Spain.

The airline was established as part of the Miguel Primo de Rivera government's efforts to establish state-controlled monopolies controlling essential services. As had been done with CAMPSA and with CTNE, a monopoly was created by merging existing Spanish air transport companies. CLASSA's inaugural flight took place on 27 May 1929 between Getafe (Madrid) and Sevilla although regular operations wouldn't officially start until November.

CLASSA ceased operations in 1933, the second year of the Spanish Republic, and in those years did not have any air accidents.

== History ==
CLASSA was an airline established following the creation of the Higher Aeronautic Council (Consejo Superior de Aeronáutica) through a decree issued on 9 April 1927. The newly created council existed to unify existing civil airlines which reflected General Primo de Rivera's policy of establishing state monopolies to run the country's essential public services. Following a decree issued on 9 January 1928, the creation of a new airline was tendered and two proposals were presented.

Iberia, Unión Aérea Española (U.A.E.), Compañía Española de Tráfico Aéreo (C.E.T.A.), the pilot training company Compañía Española de Aviación (C.E.A.) and the airship line Transaérea Colón were merged in order to form CLASSA. Companies with active government contracts, such as Compañía Aérea Jorge Loring, were exempt from joining until their contracts expired, but would join later.

It was formally constituted as a company on 13 March 1929, with the full name Concesionaria de Líneas Aéreas Subvencionadas, Sociedad Anónima, but it would be known by the acronym 'CLASSA', which officially began operations of the lines flown by the previous companies on 25 November 1929. However, it was decided that the official date of its constitution would be 25 May 1929, which was the date in which CLASSA took over the fleets and staff of the companies that had been merged. Compañía Española de Tráfico Aéreo (C.E.T.A.), which had been founded in 1920, ceased to exist at that time.

The only exception was U.A.E.'s Sevilla - Granada flight which would continue to be operated by this company until January 1930. On that date the remaining two Junkers G 24s used by U.A.E. joined CLASSA's fleet, while the third had been transferred to CLASSA the previous year. U.A.E had sold all its CLASSA shares to Jorge Loring on 24 May 1929, at which time Loring became the primary de facto shareholder of the new company but ceased to exist once their Sevilla - Tetuán - Larache line was taken over by CLASSA on 31 January 1931.

In May 1930 CLASSA made the first commercial flight to the Canary Islands using one of its Ford 4-AT trimotors, the only aircraft in the fleet with a radio. The plane landed on 20 May at Los Rodeos Airport (now Tenerife Norte) in Tenerife Island.

Following the proclamation of the Second Spanish Republic in 1931 LAPE (Líneas Aéreas Postales Españolas) was established to replace CLASSA and on 23 September 1931, CLASSA's contract with the Spanish government was cancelled, however CLASSA continued flying under the Spanish Republican Flag for another year. LAPE began operations in April 1932, with their assets and fleets being merged. The Republican government of Spain compensated CLASSA's shareholders after it was dissolved.

== Fleet ==
- 1 Breguet 26T Limousine
- 2 Fokker F.VII
- 2 Ford 4-AT
- 3 Junkers G 24

== See also ==
- History of Iberia Airlines
- LAPE
