= LAPE =

Spanish national airline (1932–1939)

LAPE Líneas Aéreas Postales Españolas
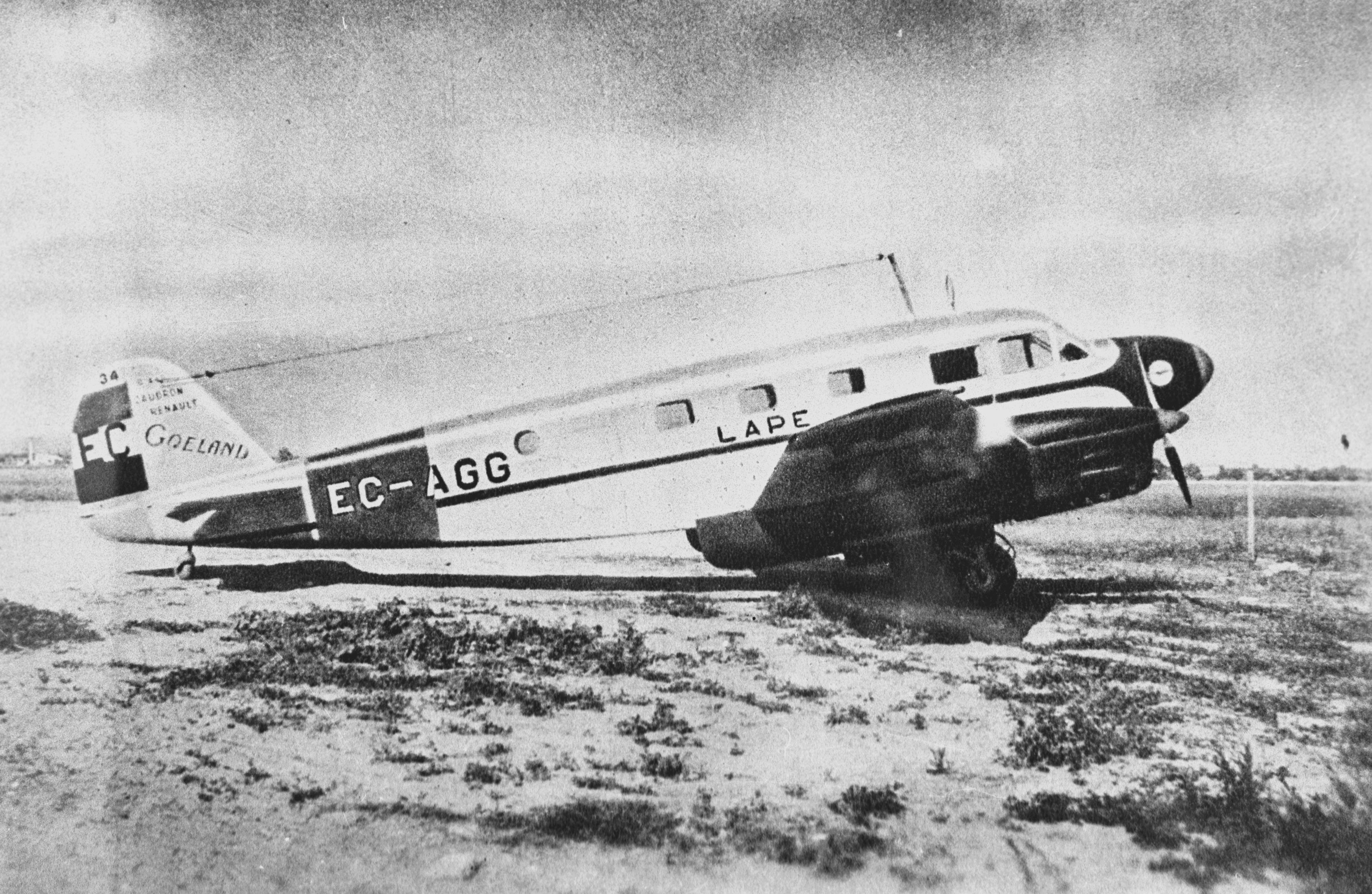
- LAPE Caudron C.448 Goéland
IATA	ICAO	Call sign
—	—	LAPE
- Founded: 1932
- Ceased operations: April 1, 1939
- Operating bases: Madrid-Barajas; Barcelona El Prat
- Focus cities: Madrid; Barcelona; Sevilla; Palma de Mallorca; Valencia; Tenerife; Las Palmas
- Destinations: Santander, Toulouse
- Parent company: Govt. of the Spanish Republic (55%)
- Headquarters: Madrid, Spain

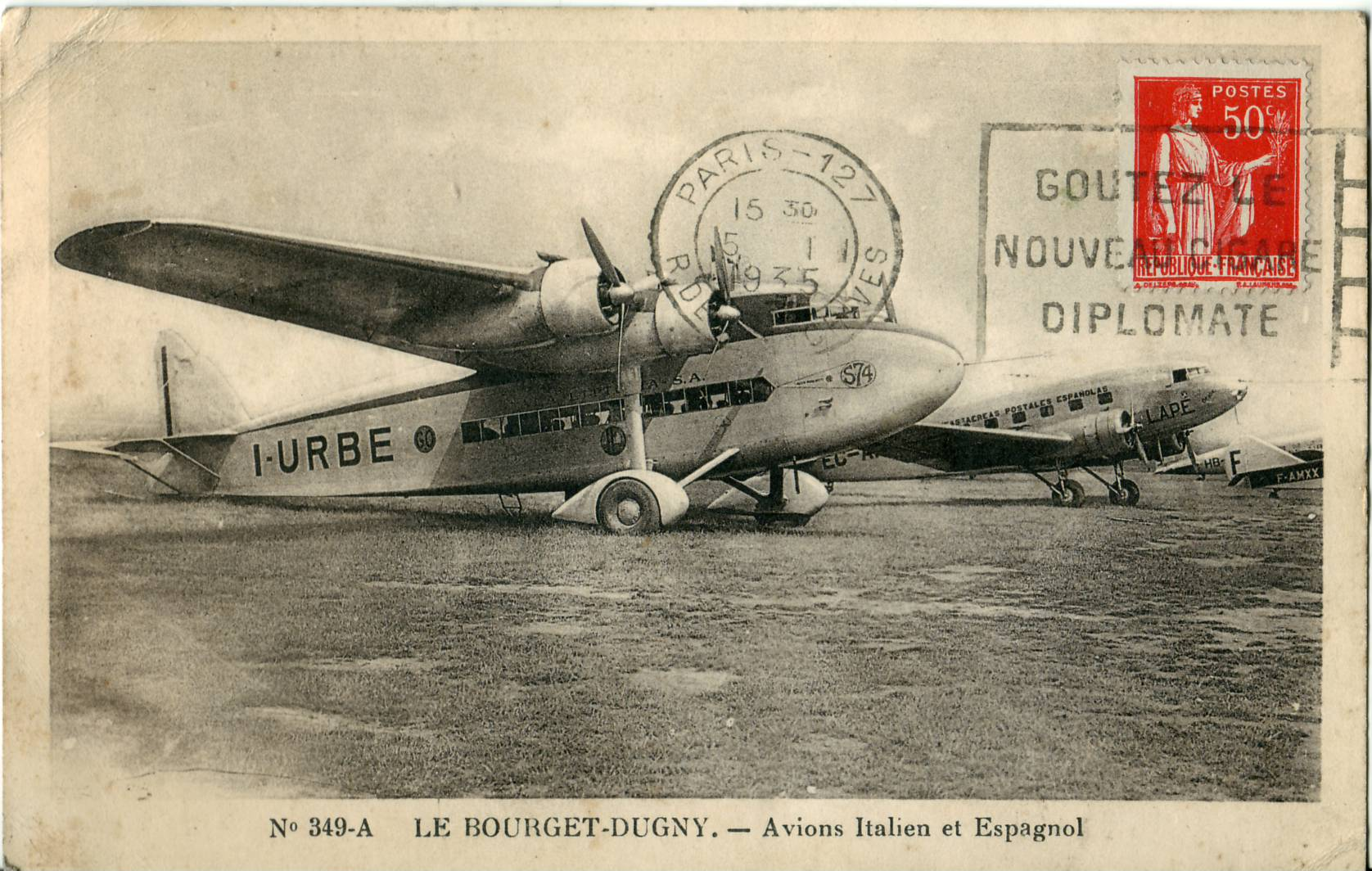
A LAPE Douglas DC-2 behind the plane in the foreground at Paris – Le Bourget Airport

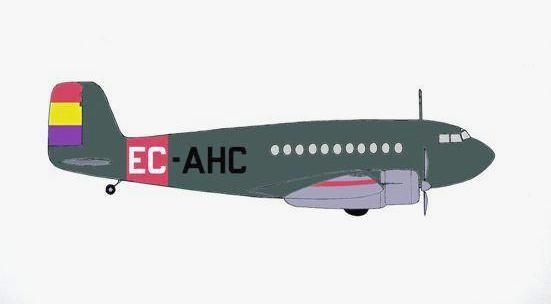
LAPE Breguet 470 Fulgur that flew the Barcelona - Toulouse line and fled to France at the end of the Civil War

LAPE, Spanish Postal Airlines (Líneas Aéreas Postales Españolas), was Spain's national airline during the Second Spanish Republic.

== History ==
LAPE, often also spelt L.A.P.E. and colloquially known as "Las LAPE", replaced CLASSA (Concesionaria de Líneas Aéreas Subvencionadas), the company that had been Spain's national airline during the dictatorship of Miguel Primo de Rivera, an airline that was still reeling from the Great Depression. LAPE was established in April 1932, CLASSA flying under the Spanish Republican Flag for one year. The republican government of Spain compensated CLASSA's shareholders and established postal contracts in order to make the new airline viable. The first Douglas DC-2, part of the modernization of the fleet inherited from CLASSA, arrived in Madrid-Barajas in March 1935.

In 1932 and 1933 LAPE's air service was restricted to the Madrid-Sevilla and Madrid-Barcelona lines. In March 1934 flights to the Canary Islands were restarted and a few months later in September the line Madrid-Valencia was inaugurated. In 1935 the lines Barcelona-Palma de Mallorca, Barcelona-Valencia and Valencia-Palma de Mallorca were operated, although with interruptions. By June 1936 the company's Canary Islands line included an air service between Las Palmas and Tenerife.

The Spanish Republican Airline operated even during the Spanish Civil War in an intermittent and increasingly haphazard manner. Although a great part of the planes of its fleet were requisitioned by the Spanish Republican Air Force and used as military transports, LAPE kept operating in the Republican zones of Spain with its base in Madrid-Barajas. The Madrid-Barcelona line was functioning and it was extended to Toulouse. There was also a flight Madrid-Santander until mid-1937 when Santander fell into Nationalist hands that was flying in a wide roundabout in order to avoid the fronts. Whenever the air battles over Madrid became too difficult to handle for the LAPE pilots, the Madrid-Barcelona line was replaced by Barcelona-Albacete.

Towards the end of February 1939 Republican Air Force Colonel Núñez Mazas issued an order through which the LAPE fleet was concentrated in Monòver (Alicante) —far away from the fronts— in order to avoid the planes falling into enemy hands. The fleet were used to evacuate numerous Spanish Republican civil and military leaders in the last weeks of the conflict. Finally in April 1939, after the defeat of the Spanish Republican Armed Forces that marked the end of the Civil War, the planes belonging to LAPE's fleet were expropriated by the Francoist government and repainted with the Iberia livery.

== Fleet ==
LAPE was one of the few airlines that used the Douglas DC-1. Other planes used by LAPE included: Fokker F.VII, Spartan Executive, Caudron C.448, Breguet 470, Savoia-Marchetti S.74, Northrop Delta, Douglas DC-2, Ford Trimotor, General Aviation GA-43, Airspeed AS.6J Envoy, de Havilland Dragon Rapide and de Havilland Puss Moth.

== See also ==
- History of Iberia Airlines
- Spanish Republican Air Force
- List of aircraft of the Spanish Republican Air Force
- List of defunct airlines of Spain

== Bibliography ==
- Luis Utrilla Navarro & Marcos García Cruzado, Historia de los Aeropuertos de Madrid (I), Aeropuertos Españoles y Navegación Aérea, S.A.. eds. Madrid, 2005 ISBN 8496456315
