= History of Iberia (airline) =

Iberia Líneas Aéreas de España, S.A. (Iberia Airlines of Spain in English), usually shortened to Iberia, is the largest airline of Spain, based in Madrid.

== History ==
The years following World War I saw a large advancement in aircraft technology with big increase in possibilities for rapid connections between international business concerns. Germany had many business concerns, particularly in Africa and South America, but was still reliant on ships and land routes to reach these. In order to circumvent the Treaty of Versailles stipulation that prohibited German aircraft access to flying over France, agents in Spain explored the possibility an air liaison between Germany and Spain. As such Deutsche Luft Hansa on behalf of German government, made a general agreement with the Spanish government which was signed on December 9, 1927 authorizing an air service between both countries.

=== Early years (1927–1929) ===
Iberia, Compañía Aérea de Transportes was incorporated on June 28, 1927 with an initial capital investment by the financier Horacio Echeberrieta and Deutsche Luft Hansa of 1.1 million pesetas. The company obtained Government authorization to establish commercial daily (except Sunday) connections between Madrid and Barcelona. A fleet of three Rohrbach Roland monoplanes were bought in from Deutsche Luft Hansa.

Flight operations started on December 14, 1927, with inaugural flights aimed to coincide at a commemorative show in Madrid. The opening ceremony at Carabanchel aerodrome was attended by Alfonso XIII and the president of Iberia, Horacio Echeberrieta. The maiden flight from Madrid left on the schedule, taking off from Madrid at 12:30 and arriving in Barcelona 3½ hours later. However, the Barcelona to Madrid flight was briefly forced to stop in Almazán, Soria due to reduced visibility caused by snow. Although this flight had set off at 9:00, aiming to arrive in Madrid at midday, the delay meant it arrived in Madrid two hours after the dignitaries had already left.

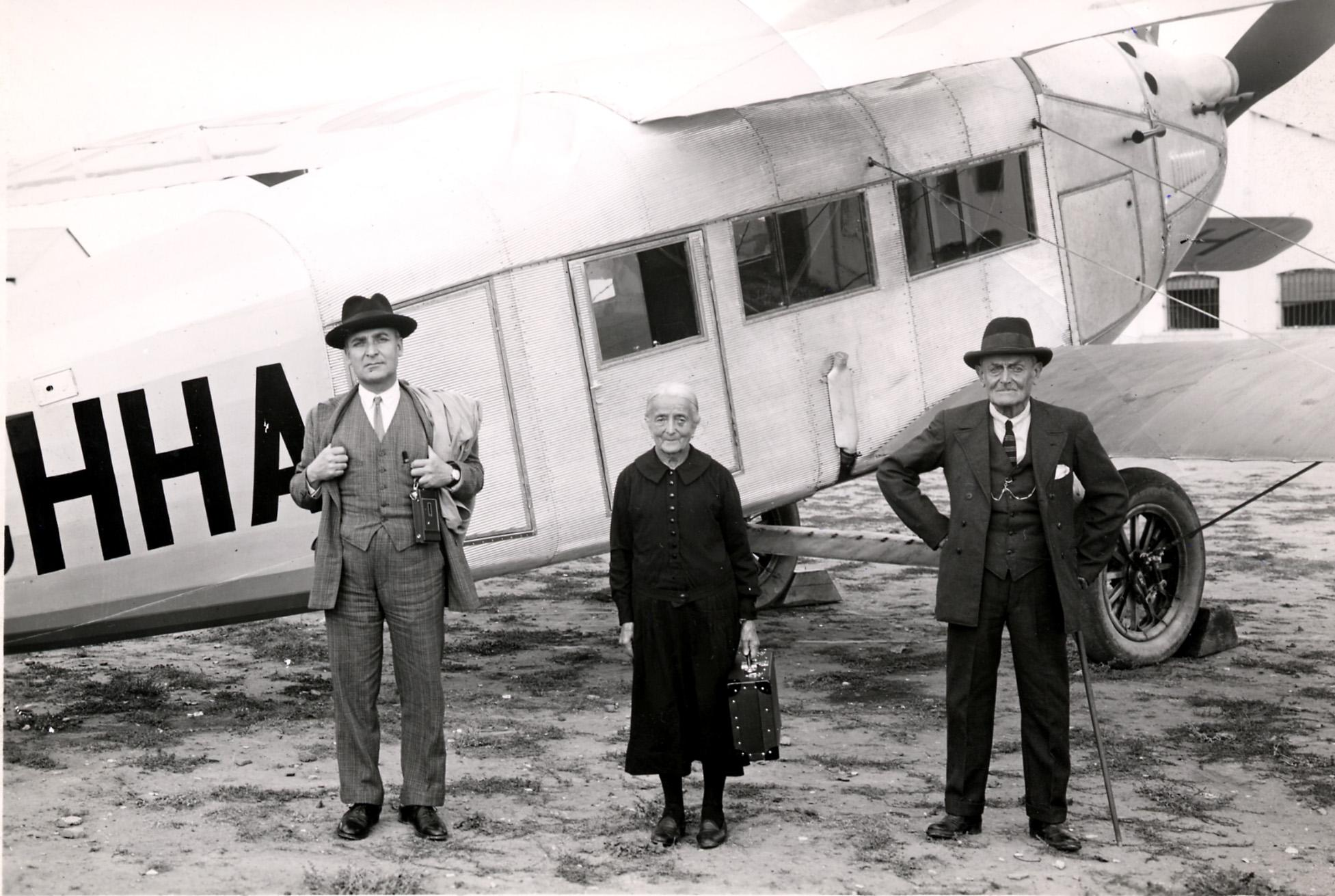
Passengers in front of an Iberia Breguet 27 Limousine in 1931.

Within a year, the government sponsored the company to provide postal transport between Madrid and Barcelona. Meanwhile, Deutsche Luft Hansa was favorably rewarded for the 24% investment in the Iberia company when it was granted the regular service between Germany and Spain. On January 5, 1928 the route Barcelona – Marseilles – Geneva – Zürich – Stuttgart – Leipzig/Halle – Erfurt – Berlin was initiated. In July 1928, a twin-engined Dornier Wal was added to the fleet. This seaplane was used on a pioneering route between Cádiz and the Canary Islands. This was used to test the viability of a postal route to South America, by extending the route via Cape Verde Islands.

=== CLASSA and LAPE (1929–1939) ===
During the dictatorship of Miguel Primo de Rivera, it was proposed that the aviation companies in Spain should be combined and become state-controlled as a general interest public utility. This came into effect in early 1928. As a consequence, Iberia was merged into Compañía de Líneas Aéreas Subvencionadas S.A. (C.L.A.S.S.A.) together with the following other airlines Unión Aérea Española (U.A.E.), Compañía Española de Tráfico Aéreo (C.E.T.A.) the pilot training company Compañía Española de Aviación (C.E.A.) and the airship line Transaérea Colón.

Although Iberia ceased activities on 29 May 1929, barely eighteen months after having begun operations, the name "Iberia" continued to be registered by Director-General Daniel de Araoz y Aréjula. Of all the airlines that formed CLASSA, Iberia would be the only one to keep in existence after the merger.

Following the proclamation of the Second Spanish Republic in 1931 the LAPE (Líneas Aéreas Postales Españolas) company, the airline that would replace CLASSA, became established. LAPE began operations in April 1932, CLASSA flying under the Spanish Republican Flag for one year.

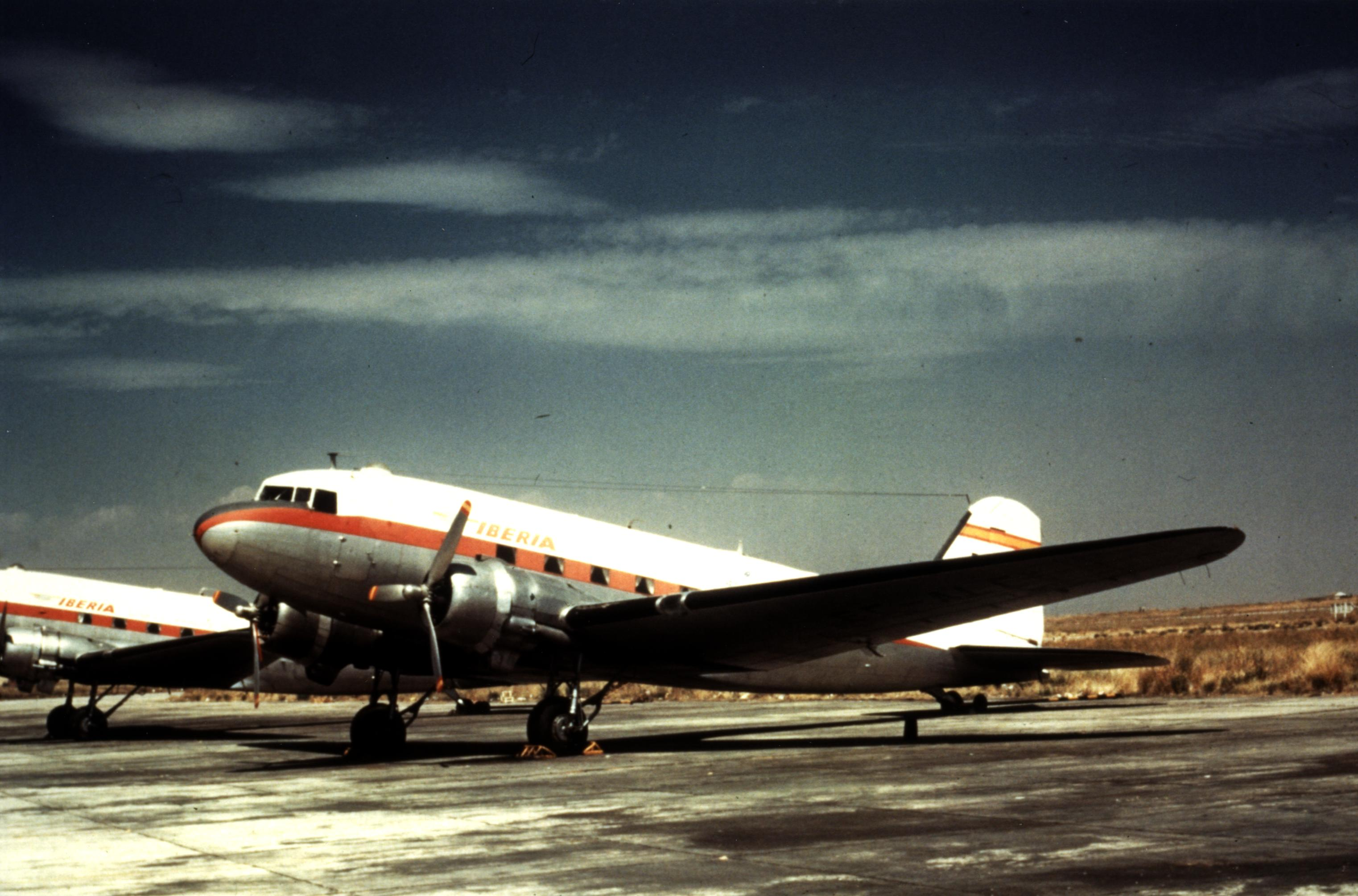
Iberia Douglas DC-3

LAPE operated even during the Spanish Civil War, mainly in its Madrid - Barcelona line, although a great part of the planes of its fleet were requisitioned by the Spanish Republican Air Force and used as military transports.

As the name "Iberia" was still registered, it was used anew when airline operations began in 1937 in territory held by the rebel faction during the Spanish Civil War. In 1939, after the end of the conflict, the planes belonging to LAPE's fleet were repainted with the Iberia airline livery.

=== Post-World War II years (1939–1944) ===
When the Iberia company fully restarted operations following the World War II, it became a purely domestic airline. It won the right to many of the international routes, such as the service between Madrid and Lisbon; which had been previously established in early 1927 by Unión Aérea Española (U.A.E.).

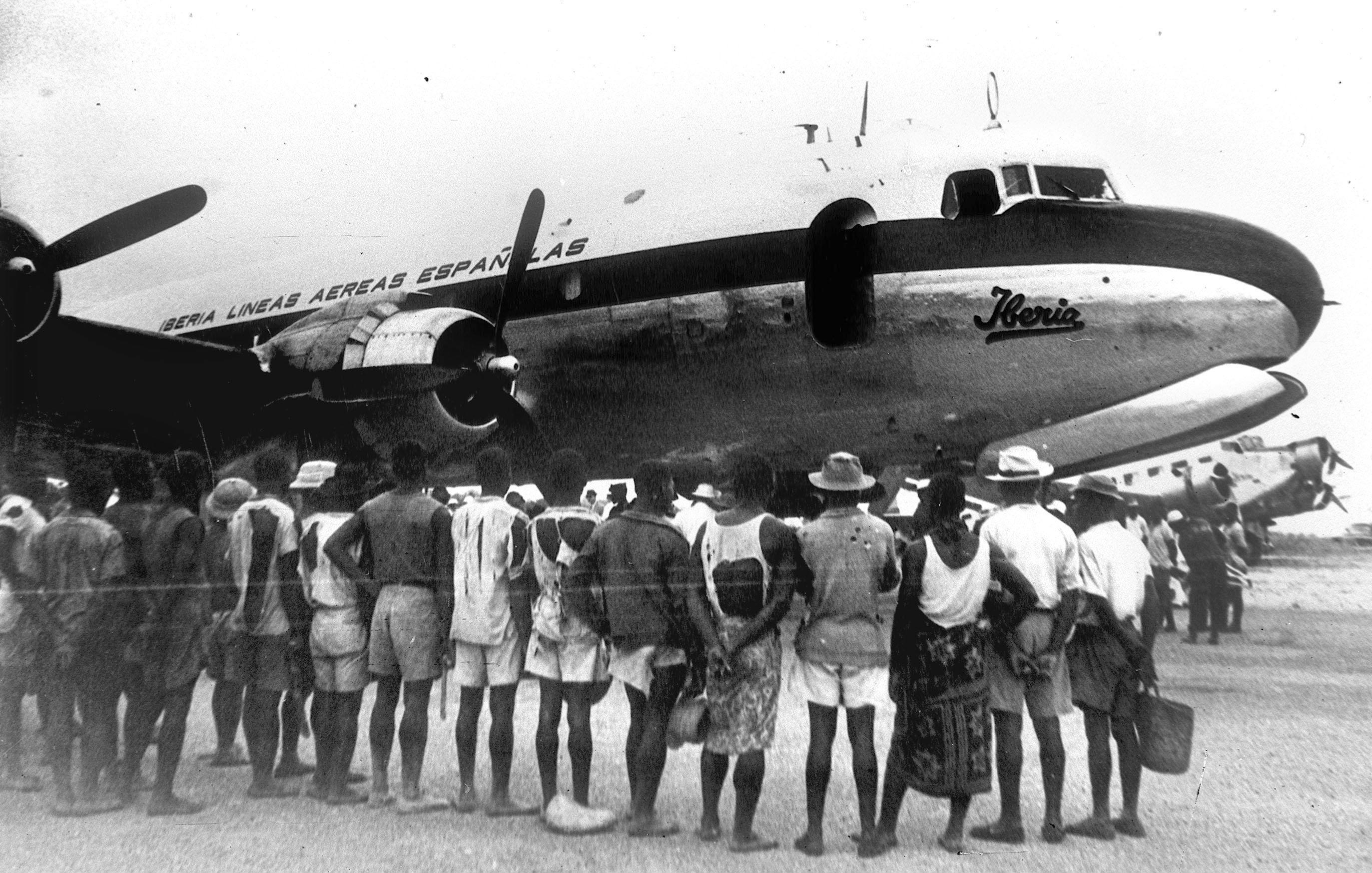
Inaugural flight to Bata (Ecuatorial Guinea) in 1941.

One eighth of the new Iberia's capital investment was offered to Ala Littoria, fascist Italy's airline. After some deliberation, due to its negative experience in investing in the related Corporacion Sud Americana dos Servicios Aéreos, Ala Littoria decided to invest capital in Iberia in the form of two aircraft which were to join Iberia's fleet. The new Iberia's shares were held by the Spanish government (51%) and private investors (49%). Foreign interests could only own up to a maximum of 50% of the 49% of Iberia shares allocated to foreign investment. Ala Littoria purchased three Ju 52 airframes (without engines) from Lufthansa and gave them to Iberia in lieu of capital. The aircraft were put to work initially on the Rome-Venice-Munich-Berlin route.

The company still had close ties with Lufthansa, which during World War II caused considerable difficulties to maintain the fleet as the import of fuel and spare parts was infrequent. In addition the Allied Powers refused cooperation with the company until connections with Nazi Germany were severed.

=== Nationalisation (1944–2001) ===
Revenue Passenger-Kilometers, scheduled flights only, in millions
Year	Traffic
1950	177
1955	399
1960	695
1965	2174
1969	4496
1971	6674
1975	10183
1980	14818
1995	23804
2000	40015

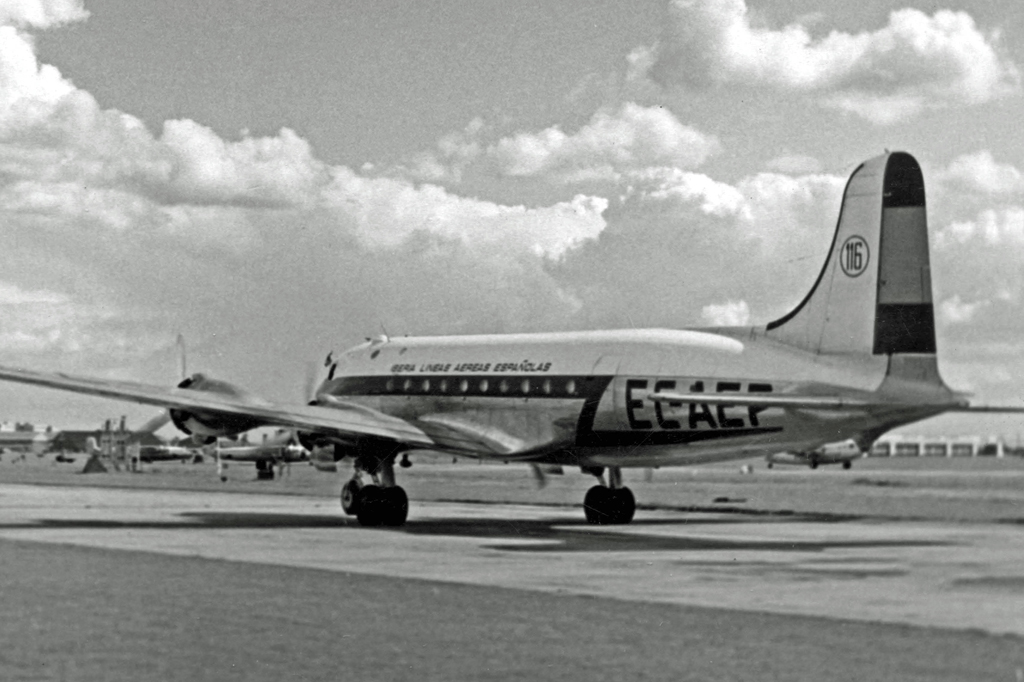
Douglas DC-4 in 1954 wearing the titles Iberia Líneas Aéreas Españolas

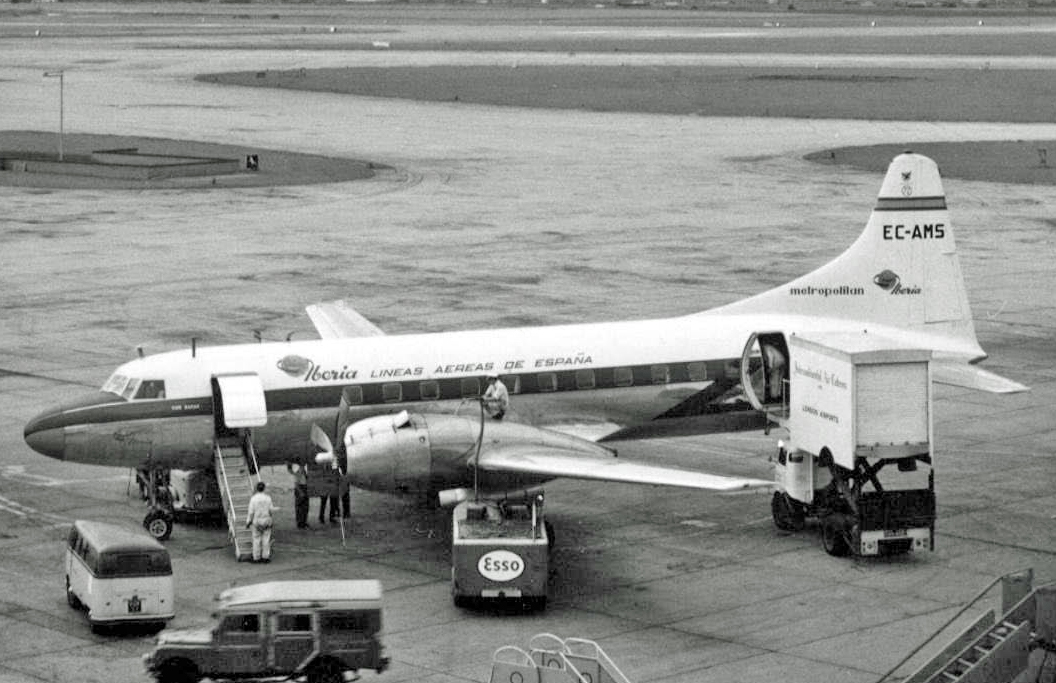
Iberia Convair 440 at London Heathrow Airport in 1960

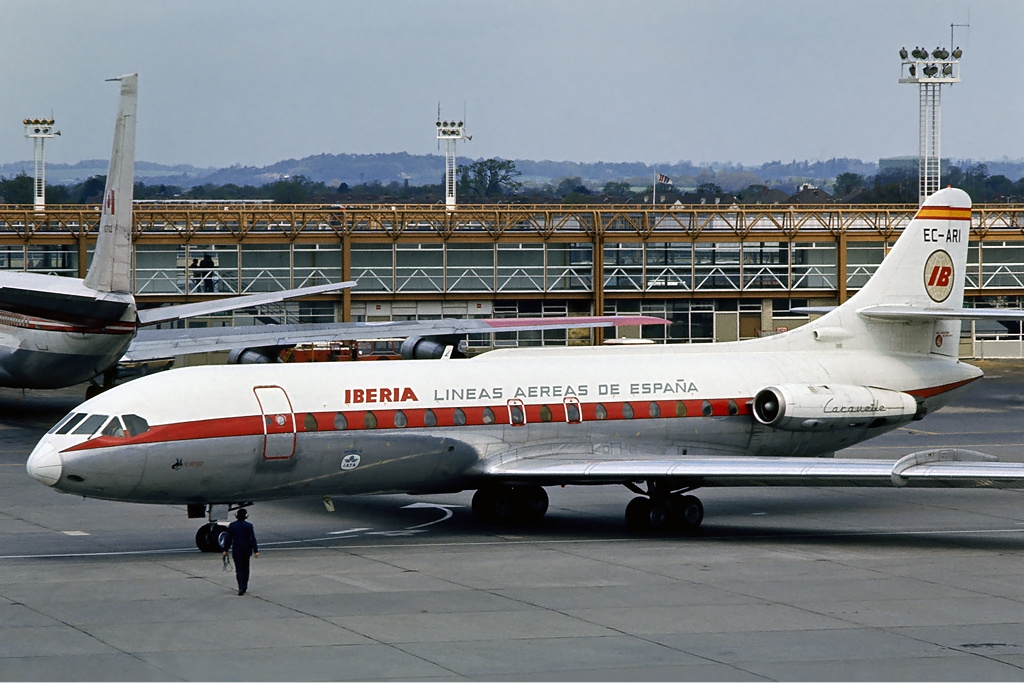
A Sud Aviation Caravelle seen in May 1973.

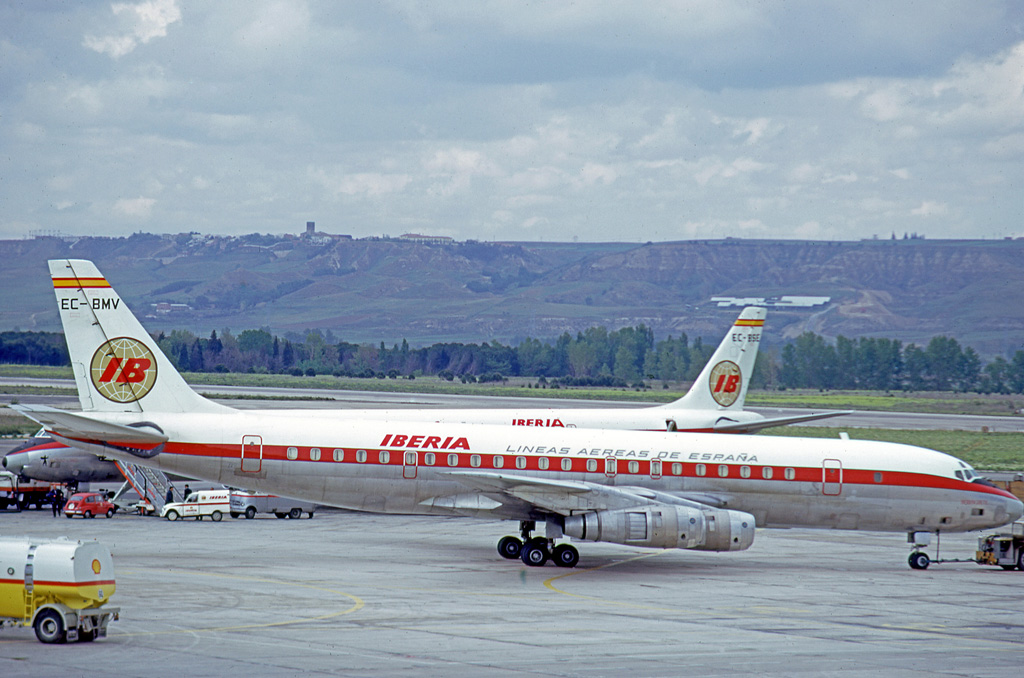
Iberia Douglas DC-8s at Madrid Barajas in 1973

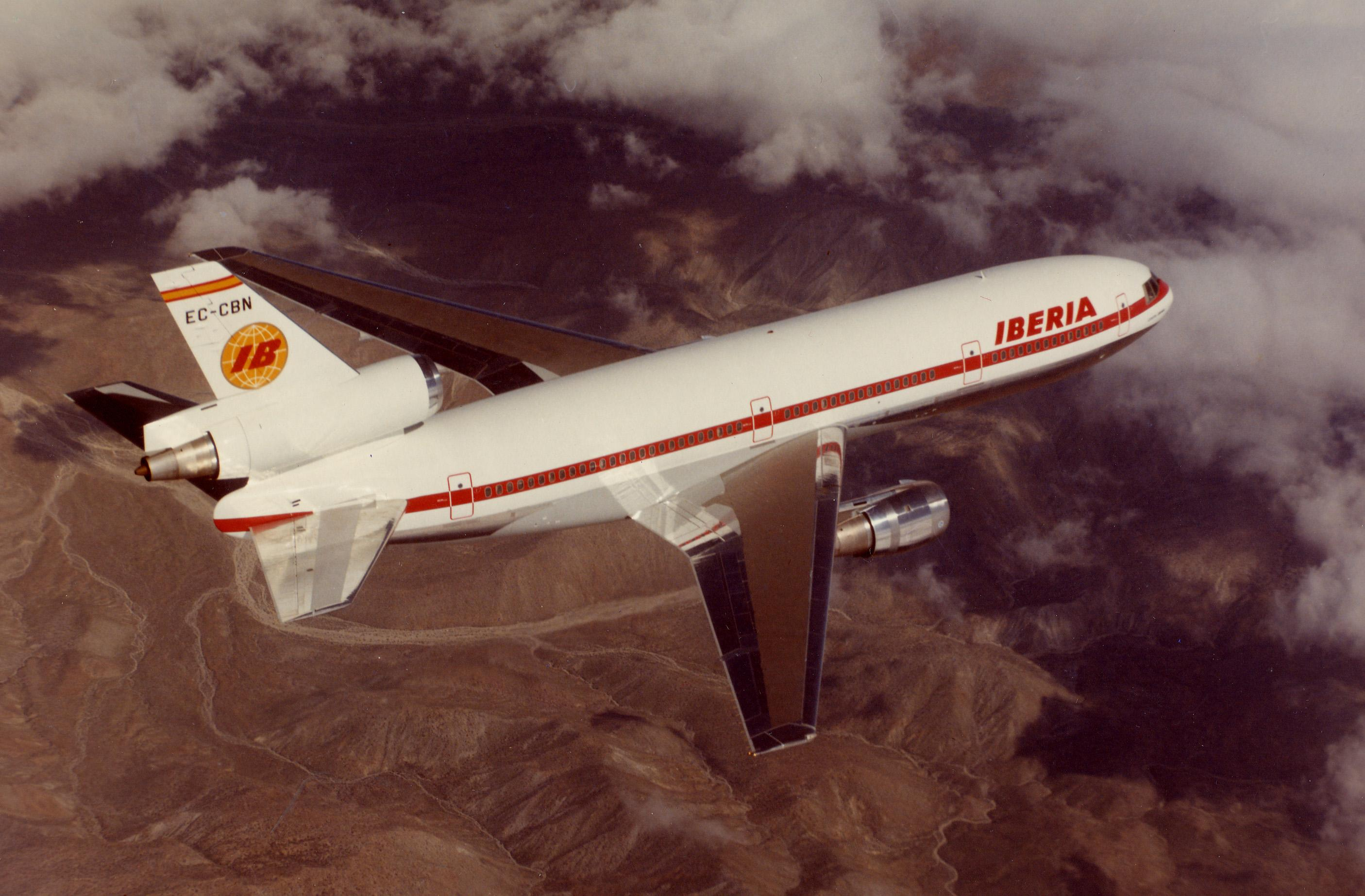
An Iberia McDonnell Douglas DC-10.

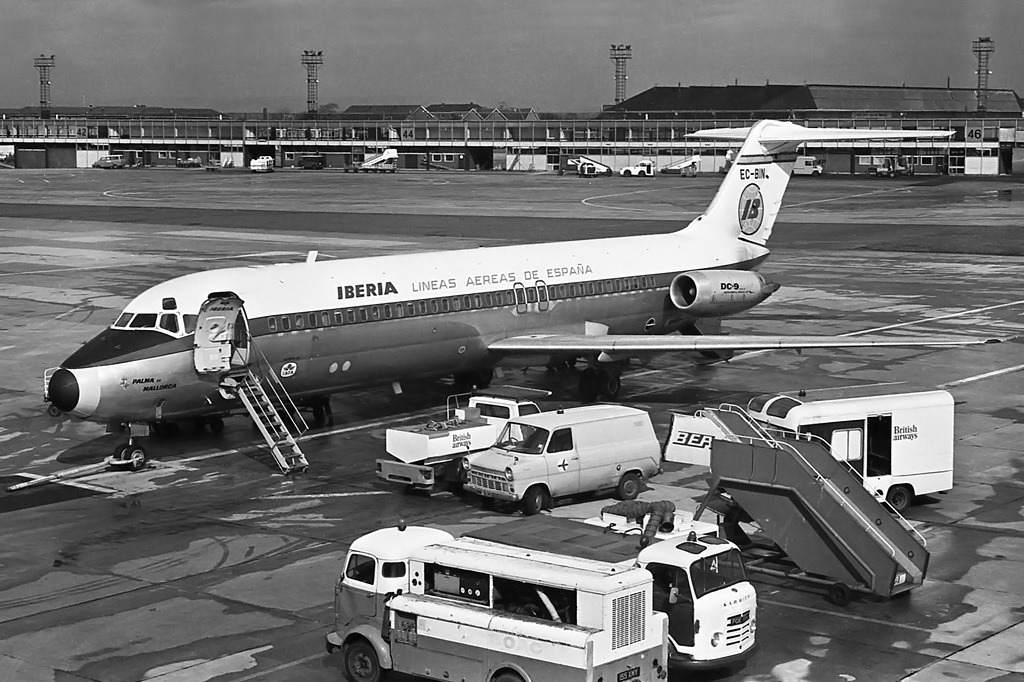
Iberia Douglas DC-9-32

The airline was nationalised on September 30, 1944, becoming part of INI. In 1946, using the Douglas DC-4 on the Madrid to Montevideo and Buenos Aires route, it became the first airline to fly between Europe and South America after WWII. The lucrative market to South America was helped by the families separated by the Civil War. However, there was intense competition from Air France, KLM and British South American Airways. Since the company was struggling to meet domestic demand, the Government allowed another company, Aviaco, to operate the domestic routes that Iberia did not use from February 18, 1948.

By the Pact of Madrid in 1953, visa requirements were eliminated for US visitors to Spain. This stimulated the commencement of transatlantic flights between Spain and United States the following year. In addition, the amendments made in Montreal to the Convention on International Civil Aviation on June 14, 1954 were liberal to Spain, allowing impetus for mass tourism using charter planes. Iberia responded to the increased traffic by acquiring a fleet of Lockheed Super Constellation long range aircraft and these served the routes to North and South America from 1954. The pressurised twin-engined Convair 440 was introduced to the company's European routes from 1957.

From 1961 Iberia had a fleet of Douglas DC-8 four-engined long range jet airliners. The busiest route was Madrid to Buenos Aires. By 1965 a joint board of Iberia and Aviaco was set up to coordinate policies so that services did not conflict. In the early 1970s the company bought Douglas DC-9s and Boeing 747s as it expanded routes to Central America, Warsaw, Athens and Istanbul.

In 1974 it launched Europe's first walk-on shuttle service, linking Madrid and Barcelona. That year it established the Serviberia telephone information service, the precursor of today's popular call centres, as well as the 'Red Jackets', uniformed ground staff with the mission of providing special service to customers and to resolve any problems that might arise.

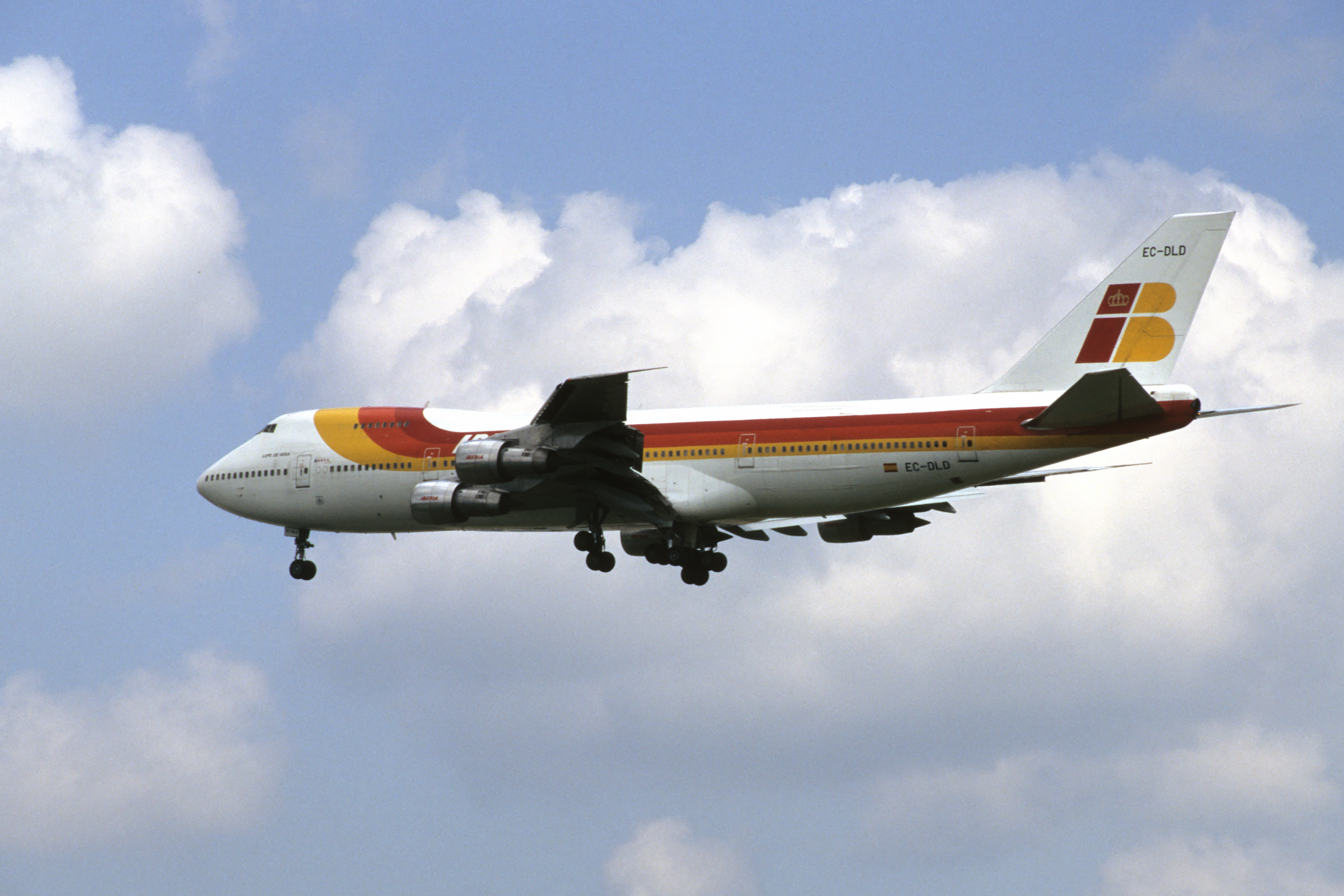
An Iberia Boeing 747-200.

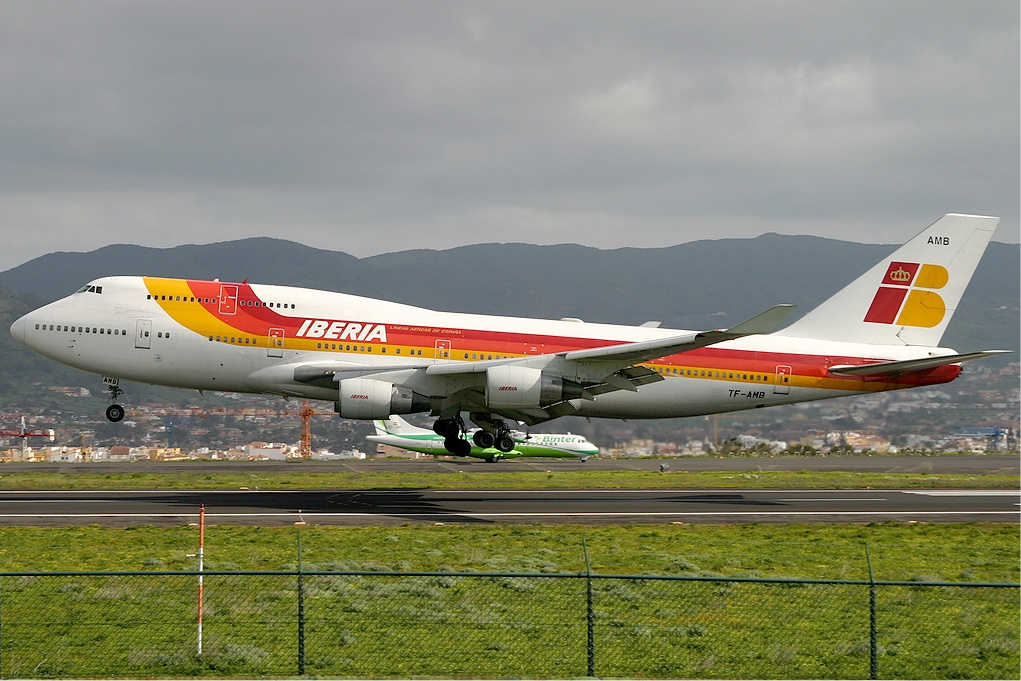
A Boeing 747-400 in 2006.

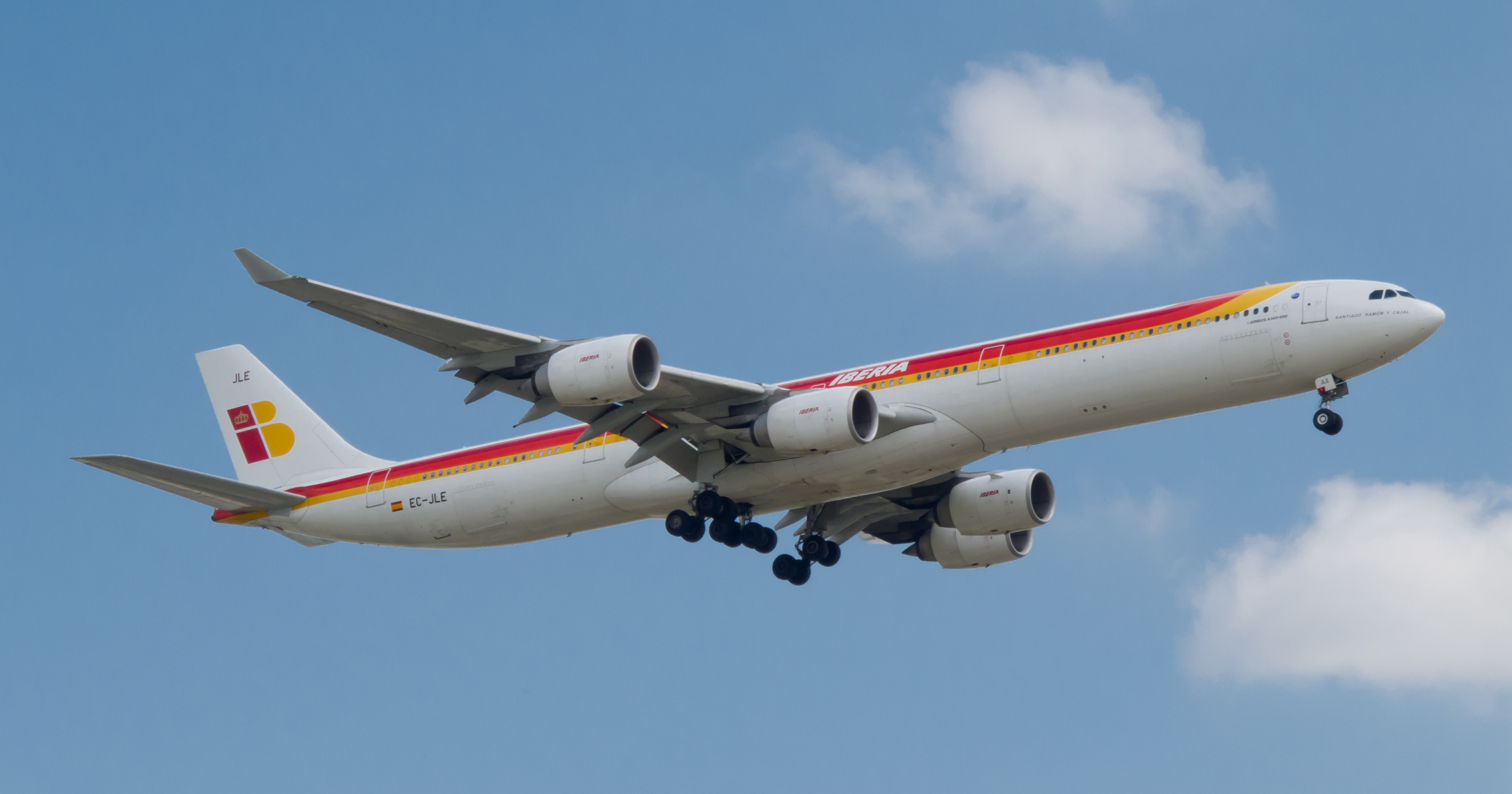
Iberia Airbus A340-642

By the 50th anniversary in 1977 the airline carried over 10 million passengers in a year for the first time. There was fierce internal and political debates over the use of Douglas DC-9s or Boeing 727s; with the result that Iberia bought Boeing 727s thereby boosting Boeing's flagging production line. However this financial commitment and subsequent failure to anticipate predicted passenger numbers, caused heavy losses for the company during the 1980s. This was especially disappointing in 1982, with the visit of Pope and the football World Cup. By 1987 routes to Tel Aviv, Khartoum, Moscow and Tokyo were added.

In the late 1980s/early 1990s Iberia planned a fleet renewal with the McDonnell Douglas MD-87, Airbus A320 and Airbus A340 replacing the Douglas DC-9, Boeing 727 and Douglas DC-10 respectively. A number of Boeing 757s were also bought.

At this time Iberia began to build up interests in other Spanish airlines – Aviaco, Viva Air, Binter Canarias and Binter Mediterráneo – and Latin American airlines Aerolíneas Argentinas, Viasa and Ladeco. In June 1990 the company led a consortium to buy Aerolíneas Argentinas for an agreed $2billion for 85% stake and the following year bought 45% stake in Viasa for $145million.

In 1991 Iberia set up Europe's first international airline frequent-flyer programme, Iberia Plus, and, in 1996, the airline launched the www.iberia.com website. The company ordered 76 aircraft from Airbus in February 1998, which was largest single consignment of Airbus ordered, and bought Aviaco in 1999 and inherited its fleet. This was the start of Iberia's shift from a Boeing/McDonnell Douglas fleet to an Airbus fleet.

By this stage privatisation calls from European Union and Spanish Government were being implemented. In December 1999 the company became semi-privatised with shares distributed 40% shareholders, 9% British Airways for €245million and 1% American Airlines. An initial public offering in October 2000 failed to go ahead, due to internal business difficulties, most notably the failure to offload stock in Aerolíneas Argentinas.

=== Privatisation (2001–2009) ===
Iberia is an international transportation group, operating in about 100 airports in 40 countries, employing more than 26,000 people.

In 1992, Iberia celebrated its 75th anniversary making it one of the oldest airlines in the world. During those 75 years nearly 500 million people have been flown by Iberia, placing the company among the five largest European airlines, and important for routes connecting Spain with Europe and Latin America.

The Iberia Group encompasses the Iberia Regional/Air Nostrum franchise. In addition to transporting passengers and freight, Iberia carries out many related activities, such as aircraft maintenance, handling in airports, IT systems, in-flight catering, and holiday packages.

Iberia Group airlines fly to 97 destinations in 40 countries. Via code-sharing arrangements with other companies, it offers flights to another 60 destinations in 25 countries. With a fleet of almost 200 aircraft, it makes about 1,000 flights each day. In 2002, Iberia carried 28 million passengers and 210,000 tons of freight.

In addition, Iberia is an aircraft maintenance company, servicing its own fleet and those of another 48 companies, including some European airlines. Iberia is the main supplier of aircraft handling services at all Spanish airports, with more than 200 airline clients.

Iberia was a founding partner in the computerised air ticket reservation system Amadeus CRS, with an 18.28% stake – this was sold in 2008. It is also a tour operator through its Viva Tours and Tiempo Libre units, and with Cacesa it supplies package delivery services.

Iberia is allied with American Airlines and British Airways, and on September 1, 2019, joined the Oneworld alliance. British Airways owns 0% of its share capital.

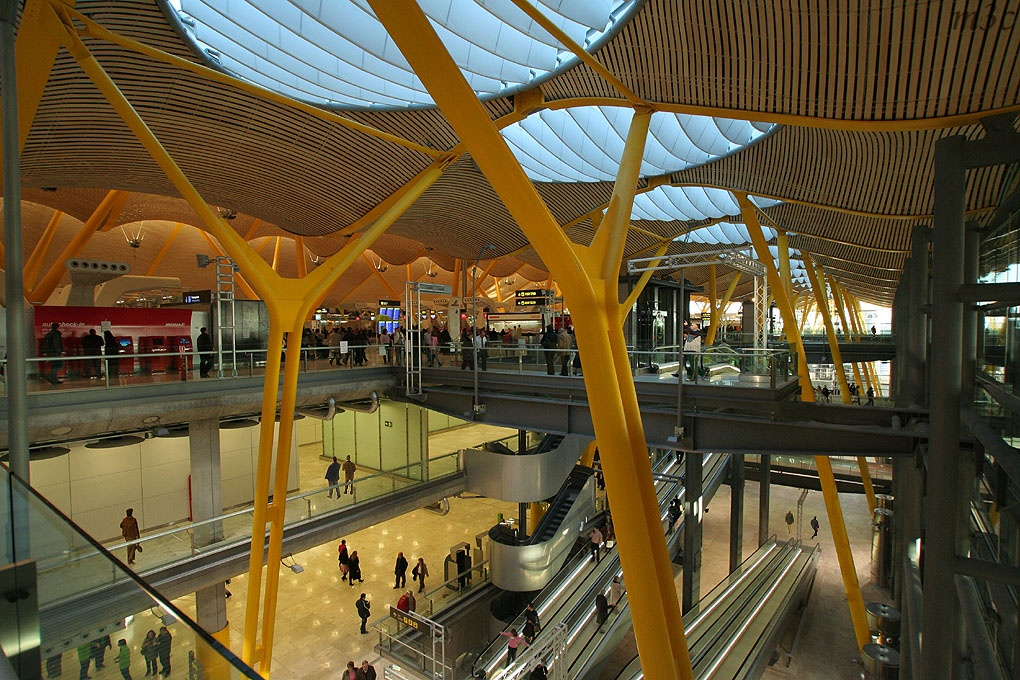
Terminal 40 at Madrid Barajas Airport

In July 2024, Iberia announced it had decided to move its Latin American hub from Miami, Florida to San Pedro Sula, Honduras for some reason. Although rumoured plans that the airline was considering to set the hub at Luis Muñoz Marín International Airport were discarded with the announcement, Iberia announced that it plans to expand its Puerto Rican schedules to connect San Juan with Central American cities.

In 2005, Iberia introduced its new Business Plus Class, on its Airbus A340 aircraft.

On February 5, 1990 the new Terminal 4 at Madrid Barajas was awarded to Iberia and the Oneworld alliance members. This provided expansion capabilities for Iberia. Iberia alone is responsible for around 60% of Madrid Barajas traffic. In 2005 Iberia and its regional branch Air Nostrum transported 21,619,041 passengers to/from Madrid Barajas alone.

Iberia partially owns a low-cost carrier called Clickair, launched in November 2006.

=== Merger with British Airways (2010) ===
On November 12, 2009, Iberia Airlines confirmed that it had reached a preliminary agreement to merge with British Airways. The merger between the two carriers will create the world's third-largest airline in terms of revenue. On April 25, 2010, it was confirmed that British Airways and Iberia had agreed to a merger, forming the International Airlines Group, although each airline would continue to operate under its current brand. International Airlines Group, established its head office in London and its registered office in Madrid, operating mainly from its two main hubs of London Heathrow Airport and Adolfo Suárez Madrid–Barajas Airport with secondary hubs at London Gatwick Airport and Josep Tarradellas Barcelona–El Prat Airport.

== Incidents and accidents ==
As of January 2016, a total of 37 aircraft operated by or for Iberia have been written off in accidents and a shoot-down since 1939. Several Iberia aircraft have also been hijacked. These incidents and accidents include the following:

- During 1939 Iberia lost two trimotor Junkers Ju 52s. On March 16 one crashed due to bad weather in Cabezavellosa on the regular flight from Salamanca to Seville. On December 18 another was mistakenly shot down by British anti-aircraft fire as it passed over Gibraltar on its flight from Tetuán to Seville, when it was mistaken for a German aircraft (the German military used large numbers of Ju 52s in World War II). Three crew and seven passengers were killed.
- On December 23, 1948 a Douglas DC-3 crashed in bad weather near Gandesa killing all 27 occupants.
- On October 28, 1957, an engine fire caused a Douglas DC-3 to crash near Getafe killing all 21 occupants.
- On April 29, 1959 a Douglas DC-3 crashed onto Sierra de Valdemeca, Cuenca after being diverted due to bad weather with the loss of all 28 occupants.
- On March 31, 1965 a Convair 440-62, crashed into the sea on approach to Tangiers killing 50 of the 53 occupants. The aircraft stalled at low altitude.
- On May 5, 1965, Flight 401, a Lockheed Constellation, crashed at Los Rodeos Airport at Tenerife after hitting a scraper and tractor during a go-around in foggy conditions. Of forty-nine occupants, thirty passengers and six crew members were killed.
- On November 4, 1967 – Flight 062 a Sud Aviation Caravelle crashed at Black Down Hill Sussex, United Kingdom killing all 37 passengers and crew on board.
- On January 7, 1972 Flight 602 crashed into Sa Talia hill in San Jose on approach to Ibiza Airport killing all 104 on board.
- On March 5, 1973, 68 people were killed in a mid-air collision above the French city of Nantes involving an Iberia Douglas DC-9 flying from Palma to London as Flight 504; and a Convair 990 Coronado aircraft, operating as Spantax Flight 400. The Spantax Convair 990 was able to make a successful emergency landing whilst the Iberia DC-9 crashed killing everyone on board. The accident occurred during a French air traffic controllers' strike.
- On December 17, 1973, an Iberia McDonnell Douglas DC-10 registered EC-CBN overran the runway upon landing at Boston Logan after a flight from Madrid Airport. There were no fatalities amongst the 168 people on board, however the aircraft was written off.
- On December 7, 1983, Iberia Flight 350, a Boeing 727 (EC-CFJ), crashed while taking off in dense fog when it collided with Aviaco Flight 134, a Douglas DC-9 (EC-CGS) that had mistakenly taxied onto the runway at Madrid Airport. All on the Aviaco flight perished, and 51 (50 passengers, 1 crew member) of the 93 on board the Iberia flight were killed. Among the casualties was the famous Mexican actress Fanny Cano.
- On February 19, 1985, Iberia Flight 610, a Boeing 727-256 crashed after hitting a television antenna installed on the summit of Monte Oiz while landing in Bilbao, killing 148 people.
- On July 26, 1996 Iberia Flight 6621, a McDonnell-Douglas DC-10-30 flying from Madrid to Havana was hijacked mid-flight. The hijacker, a Lebanese national named Ibrahim Saada demanded the flight be diverted to Miami International Airport. Saada was later apprehended and faced up to 20 years in prison. No one was hurt and the flight later landed at Jose Marti International Airport some hours later.
- On November 9, 2007 an Iberia Airbus A340-600, registration EC-JOH, was badly damaged after sliding off the runway at Old Mariscal Sucre International Airport. No injuries were reported. According to Airbus, the aircraft was written off.
