= List of aircraft (Sw) =

This is a list of aircraft in alphabetical order beginning with 'Sw'.

== Sw ==
=== S-Wing ===
(S-Wing VSLX R.O.)

- S-Wing Swing

=== Swallow ===
(Swallow Aeroplane Company)

- Swallow Aeroplane Company Swallow A
- Swallow Aeroplane Company Swallow B

=== Swallow ===
(Swallow Airplane Co, Wichita, KS)

- Swallow C Coupe
- Swallow C-165
- Swallow F-28-AX
- Swallow G-29
- Swallow H
- Swallow HA Sport
- Swallow HC Sport
- Swallow HW Sport
- Swallow Hisso Swallow
- Swallow J4 Swallow
- Swallow J5 Swallow
- Swallow LT65
- Swallow Mailplane
- Swallow Monoplane Dallas Spirit
- Swallow New Swallow
- Swallow OX-5 Swallow
- Swallow Racer Miss Wichita
- Swallow Super Swallow
- Swallow T-29
- Swallow TP
- Swallow Dallas Spirit
- Swallow Dole Racer Dallas Spirit

=== Swan ===
(William G Swan, Atlantic City, NJ)

- Swan 1931 Monoplane

=== Swanson ===
(1917: Swen Swanson, Williamsburg, VA 1922: Univ of South Dakota, Vermillion, SD 1925: Swanson-(Edgar) Freeman, Vermillion, SD 1931: Rockford IL. Swanson Aircraft Co Inc, Hopewell, VA 1934: Swanson-(Olaf "Ole") Fahlin, at Nicholas-Beazley Airplane Co, Marshall, MO 1935: Fahlin Mfg Co (propellers).)

- Swanson 1917 Monoplane (retroactively SS-1?)
- Swanson 1919 Biplane (retroactively SS-2?)
- Swanson SS-3
- Swanson SS-4
- Swanson W-15 Coupe
- Swanson-Fahlin SF-1
- Swanson-Fahlin SF-2 (a.k.a. Fahlin Plymocoupe after Swansons death)
- Swanson-Freeman SF-4

=== Swanson ===
(Darwin F Swanson, Murray, IA)

- Swanson B-4-T
- Swanson C-O-2

=== Swanson ===
(Carl Swanson, Zion IL.)

- Swanson Flyabout A-12

=== Swearingen ===
((Ed) Swearingen Aircraft, San Antonio, TX)

- Swearingen Excalibur
- Swearingen Merlin I
- Swearingen SA26-T Merlin II
- Swearingen SA226-T Merlin III
- Swearingen Merlin IV
- Swearingen Merlin 300
- Swearingen Metro
- Swearingen SA226-TC Metro II
- Swearingen SA227-AC Metro III
- Swearingen SA227-AT Metro IV
- Swearingen Metro 23
- Swearingen SA-30
- Swearingen-Jaffe SJ30
- Swearingen-Jaffe SJ30-2
- Swearingen SA-32T Turbo Trainer
- Swearingen SX-300
- Swearingen Taurus

=== Swedish Aerosport ===
(Spanga, Sweden)

- Swedish Aerosport Mosquito

=== Swift ===
(Swift Aircraft Corp (pres: W R Ritchey), 3301 S Oliver, Wichita, KS)

- Swift 18
- Swift 19
- Swift Special
- Swift Sport
- Swift Trainer

=== Swift Aircraft ===
(Swift Aircraft, Norwich, Norkolk, United Kingdom)

- Swift II
- Swift VLA

=== Swing-Europe ===
(Ebringen, Germany)

- Swing-Europe Parashell

=== Swing Flugsportgeräte ===
(Landsberied, Germany)

- Swing Apus
- Swing Arcus
- Swing Astral
- Swing Axis
- Swing Brave
- Swing Cirrus
- Swing Connect
- Swing Core
- Swing Discus
- Swing Hybrid
- Swing Mirage
- Swing Mistral
- Swing Mito
- Swing Naja
- Swing Nexus
- Swing Nyos
- Swing Scorpio
- Swing Sensis
- Swing Spitfire
- Swing Sting
- Swing Stratus
- Swing Trinity
- Swing Tusker
- Swing Twin

=== Swiss Excellence Airplanes ===
(Switzerland)

- Swiss Excellence Risen
- Swiss Excellence Siren
