= SF2 (disambiguation) =

SF2 may refer to:

- SF zwei (Schweizer Fernsehen zwei), a Swiss television channel broadcasting in German
- Fahlin SF-2 Plymocoupe an experimental aircraft built by Ole Fahlin
- SoundFont 2, a file format for audio samples and associated data for use in musical synthesis
- ASF/SF2, a protein
- Sulfur difluoride, a chemical compound
- A kind of glass fabricated by Schott.
- SF2 (Scuba Force 2), an ECCR

== Video games ==
- SaGa Frontier 2
- Secret Files 2: Puritas Cordis
- Shadow Fight 2
- Shining Force II
- Star Fox 2
- Street Fighter II
- Syphon Filter 2
