= Elliptical wing =

Airplane wing with an elliptical shape

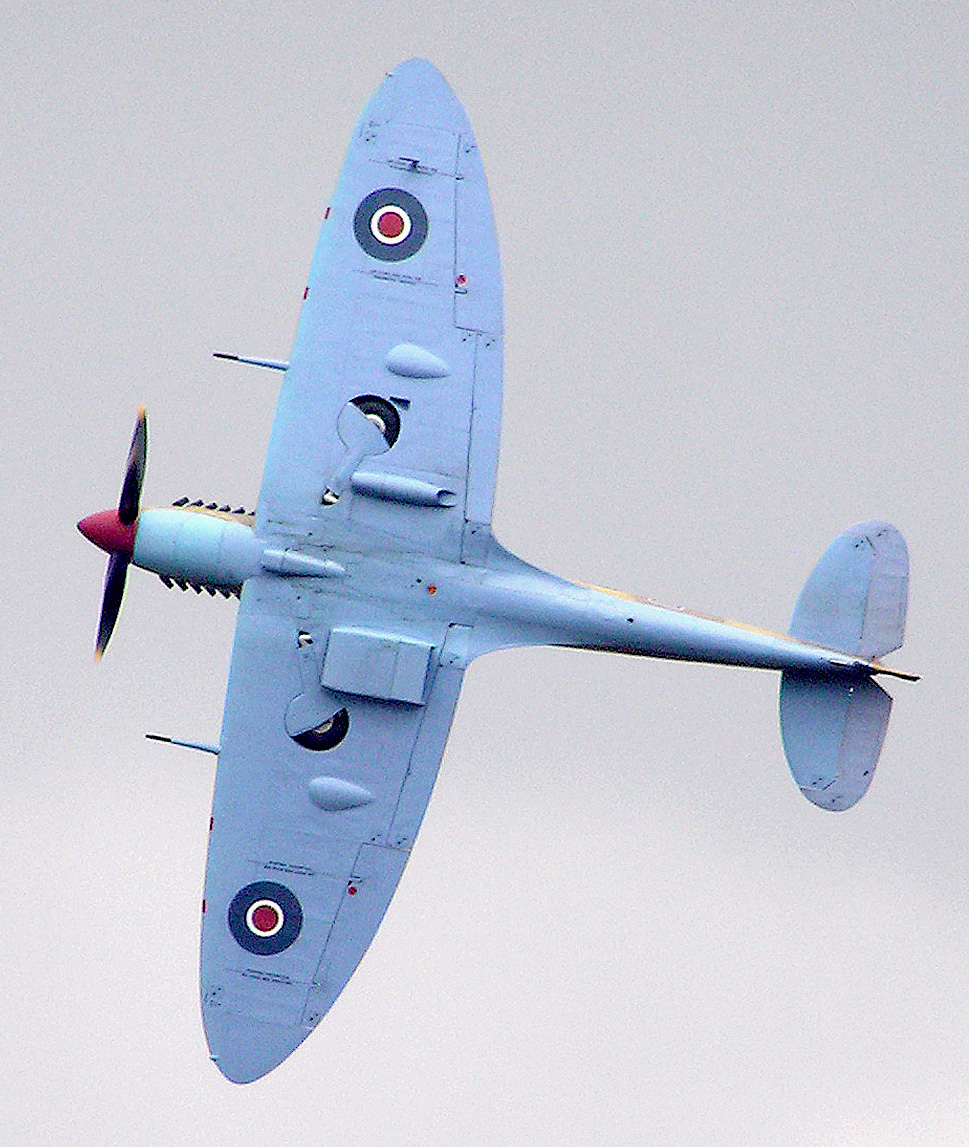
The Supermarine Spitfire uses a modified elliptical wing.

An elliptical wing is a planform whose leading and trailing edges each approximate two segments of an ellipse. It is not to be confused with annular wings, which may be elliptically shaped.

Relatively few aircraft have adopted the elliptical wing, an even-smaller number of which attained mass production; the majority of aircraft that did use this feature were introduced during the 1930s and 1940s. Perhaps the most famous aircraft to feature an elliptical wing is the Supermarine Spitfire, a Second World War-era British fighter aircraft. Another example was the Heinkel He 70 "Blitz", a German fast mail plane and reconnaissance bomber; early versions of the He 111 bomber also used such a wing configuration before a simpler design was adopted for economic reasons.

== Properties ==
Theoretically, the most efficient way to create lift is to generate it in an elliptical spanwise distribution across the wing. There is no inherent superiority to pure elliptical shapes and wings with other planforms can be optimized to give elliptical spanwise lift distributions.

The basic elliptical wing shape has disadvantages:

- The almost uniform lift distribution of a constant-aerofoil section elliptical wing can cause the entire span of the wing to stall simultaneously, potentially causing loss of control with little warning. To improve the stalling characteristics and give the pilot some warning, designers use a non-uniform aerofoil. For example, the wing of the Supermarine Spitfire was both thinned towards the tips and twisted to give washout, reducing the load on the tips so that the inner wing would stall first. Such compromises depart from the theoretical elliptical lift distribution, increasing induced drag. An elliptical spanwise lift distribution cannot be achieved by an untwisted wing with an elliptical planform because there is a logarithmic term in the lift distribution that becomes important near the wing tips.
- Elliptical wing planforms are more difficult to manufacture. In it, either leading edge or trailing edge or both are curved, and the ribs change in a non uniform way along the wingspan. In practice, most elliptical wings are approximations; for example, several sections of the Spitfire's leading and trailing edges are arcs of circles.

== The semi-elliptical wing ==
For a wing to have an elliptical area distribution, it is not necessary for both the leading and trailing edges to be curved. If one of these is straight, as in the semi-elliptical planform, the wing may still have an elliptical area distribution. Several aircraft of this type have been produced, one of the most successful being the American Seversky P-35.

During the postwar era, the semi-elliptical wing profile was extensively studied for its ground effect properties; it was postulated that it would be suitable for ground-effect vehicles (which operate close to the water, in ground effect, to avoid the higher induced drag that occurs out of ground effect). The low level of induced drag produced by a semi-elliptical wing would be beneficial for these vehicles.

== History ==
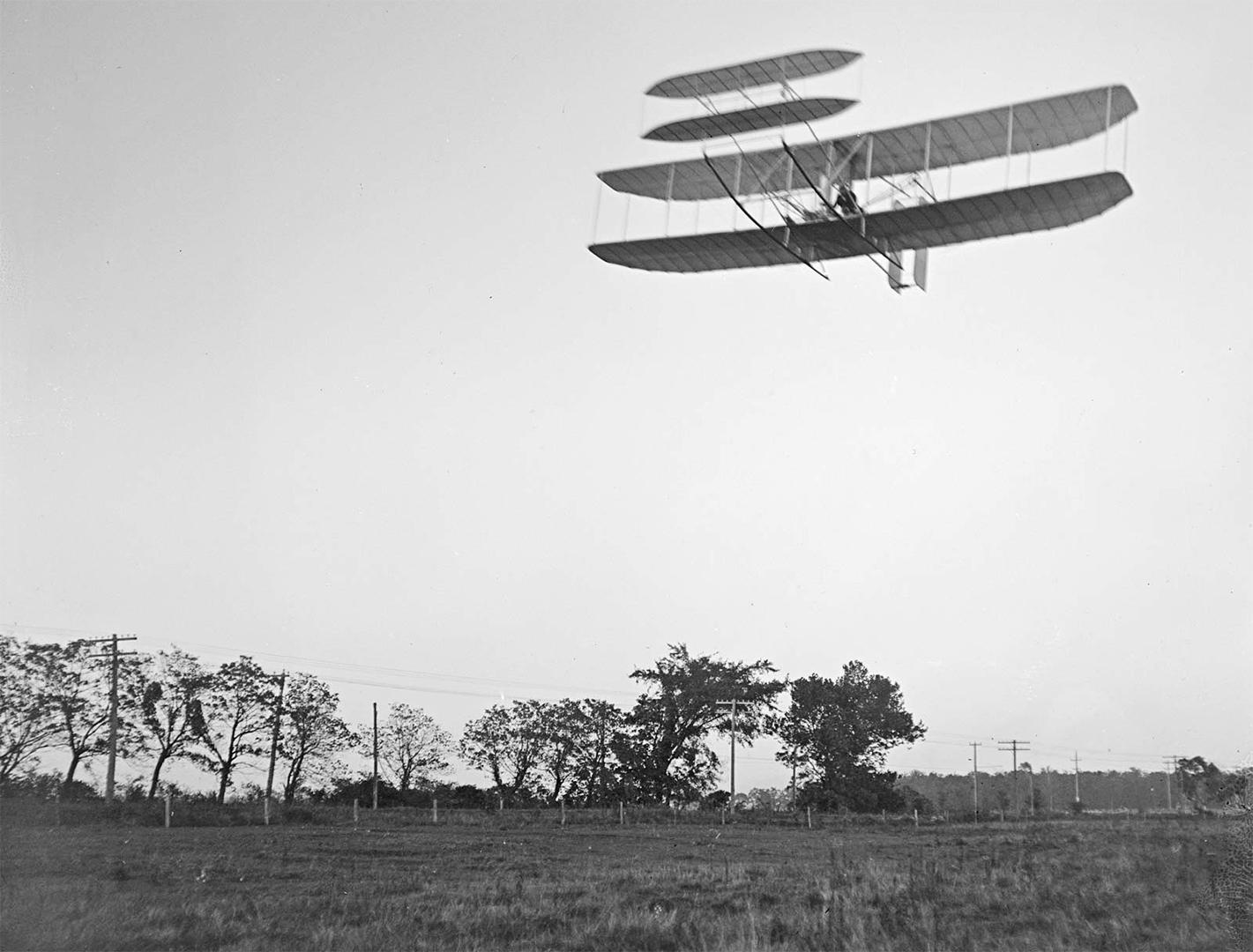
Wright Flyer III in flight 1904

The first projects of the Wright brothers have already shown the influence of these idea. The British aerodynamicist Frederick Lanchester researched the elliptical wing and wrote in detail about it in his theoretical book, having done so during 1906. But a theoretical concept than one for practical application, due to the overriding needs to compromise between an aircraft aerodynamic and its other design aspects.

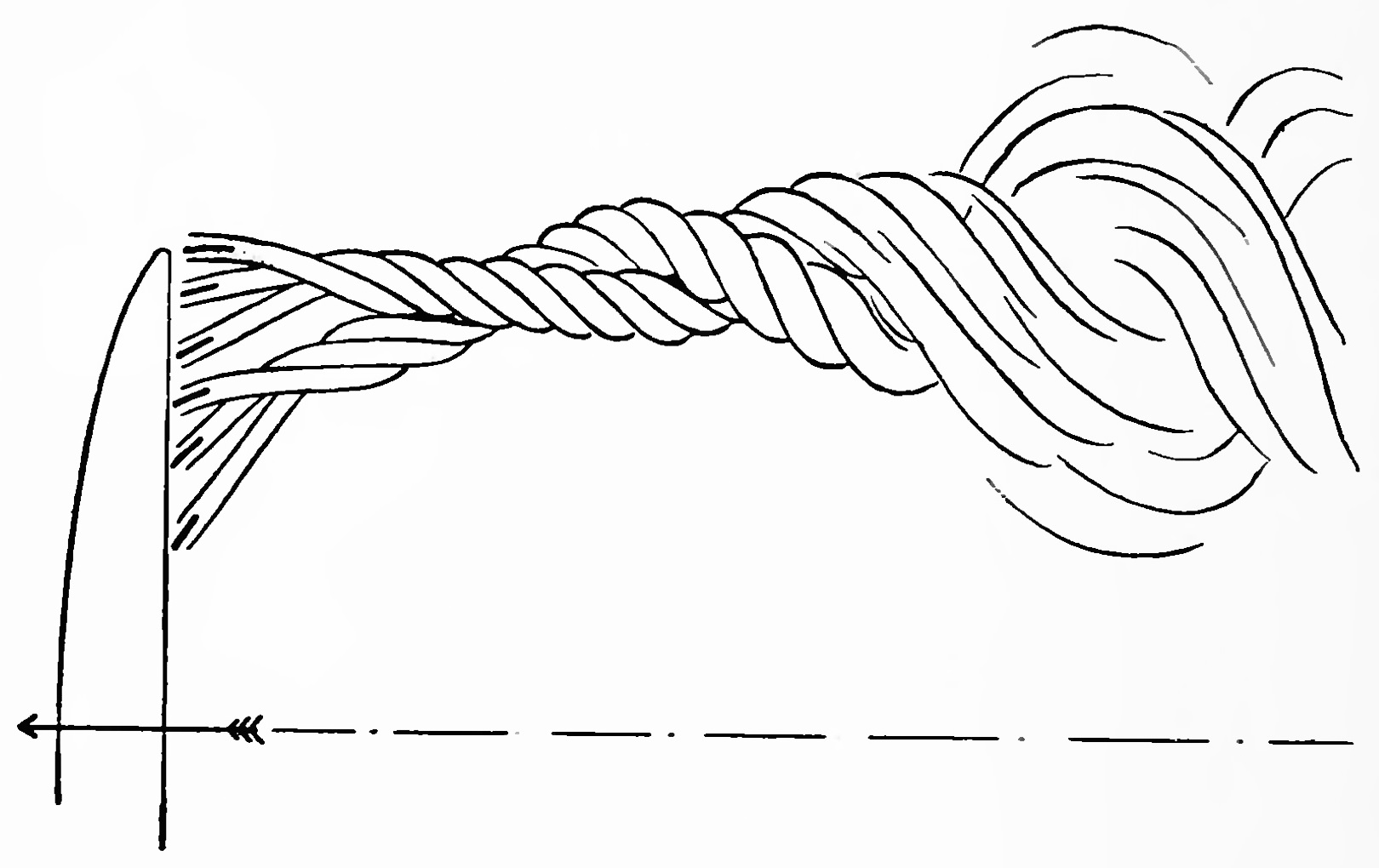
A diagram of the peripteral motion in a real fluid

The first aircraft to use a purely elliptical wing was the British Pigott Brothers' biplane, built in 1910 to a design by S. C. Parr and probably tested in 1912. Although there is little information about this very advanced aircraft and it has not been confirmed.

Ludwig Prandtl researched this in Lifting-line theory (1917–1918).

The first successful project was the Bäumer Sausewind, a German light sports aircraft that performed its maiden flight on 26 May 1925. Its designers, the Günther brothers, later joined the German aircraft manufacturer Heinkel to apply their designs, including the elliptical wing, to several projects undertaken by the firm. During the early 1930s, Heinkel developed a fast mail plane and reconnaissance bomber, the Heinkel He 70 "Blitz", which had the elliptical wing. It proved to have excellent performance for the era, establishing eight world records relating to speed over distance, having reportedly attained a maximum speed of 377 km/h (234 mph).

Shortly thereafter, Heinkel developed the He 111 bomber, which made its first flight on 24 February 1935. In comparison to the He 70, it was a larger aircraft that masqueraded as a civil airliner despite having been developed from conception to provide the nascent Luftwaffe with a fast medium bomber; this deception was due to restrictions placed on Germany after the First World War over the development or deployment of bomber aircraft. Despite the type being produced in vast numbers before and during the Second World War, only the early production models of the He 111 were equipped with an elliptical wing. The chief reason for dropping the elliptical wing in favour of one with straight leading and trailing edges was economic, the latter design could be manufactured with greater efficiency.

Perhaps the aircraft company most commonly associated with the elliptical wing was the British manufacturer Supermarine. During the early 1920s, the company's chief designer, Reginald Mitchell, had developed the Supermarine S.4, a British elliptical wing racing seaplane; it conducted its first flight during 1924. While the S.4's successors featured a wing designed by a different designer, Mitchell remained a proponent of the planform. By 1934, Mitchell and his design staff were working a new fighter aircraft for the Royal Air Force. They decided to use a semi-elliptical wing shape to solve two conflicting requirements; the wing needed to be thin to allow a high critical Mach number but it had to be thick enough to house the retractable undercarriage, armament, and ammunition. An elliptical planform is the most efficient aerodynamic shape for an untwisted wing, leading to the lowest amount of induced drag. The semi-elliptical planform was skewed so that the centre of pressure, which occurs near the quarter-chord position at all but the highest speeds, was close to the main spar, preventing the wings from twisting. The Spitfire conducted its maiden flight on 5 March 1936.

The elliptical wing was decided upon quite early on. Aerodynamically it was the best for our purpose because the induced drag caused in producing lift, was lowest when this shape was used: the ellipse was ... theoretically a perfection ... To reduce drag we wanted the lowest possible thickness-to-chord, consistent with the necessary strength. But near the root the wing had to be thick enough to accommodate the retracted undercarriages and the guns ... Mitchell was an intensely practical man ... The ellipse was simply the shape that allowed us the thinnest possible wing with room inside to carry the necessary structure and the things we wanted to cram in. And it looked nice.

— Beverly Shenstone

Mitchell has sometimes been accused of copying the wing shape of Heinkel's He 70. Communications between Ernest Heinkel and Mitchell during the 1930s establishes Mitchell's awareness of the He 70 and its performance. Beverley Shenstone, the aerodynamicist on Mitchell's team, observed that: "Our wing was much thinner and had quite a different section to that of the Heinkel. In any case, it would have been simply asking for trouble to have copied a wing shape from an aircraft designed for an entirely different purpose".

Almost all Republic P-47 Thunderbolts, an American fighter aircraft, were outfitted with elliptical wings; only the last production models differed, with squared-off wingtips, akin to the low-altitude Spitfire variants. The Aichi D3A, a Japanese dive bomber operated by the Imperial Japanese Navy, also had an elliptical wing that bore considerable similarity to that of the He 70. The Mitsubishi A5M fighter also used an elliptical wing design. Several other types had planforms which differed relatively little from the elliptical. The Hawker Tempest II fighter, which evolved into the Hawker Fury and Hawker Sea Fury, also used a near-elliptical wing planform, although squared off at the tips.

Since 2009, the British aircraft company Swift Aircraft have been reportedly developing a two-seater Very Light Aircraft, Light-sport aircraft and CS-23 category aircraft, the Swift Aircraft Swift, which has elliptical wings.
