= Model F =

Model F may refer to:

- Model F keyboard, a series of computer keyboards introduced by IBM
- Arrow Model F, a 1930s two-seat low-wing sports aircraft
- Cadillac Model F, an automobile developed in the 1900s
- Curtiss Model F, a family of biplane flying boats developed in the United States in the years leading up to World War I
- Toyota LiteAce MasterAce, also known as the Toyota Model F
