= Swanson-Fahlin SF-1 =

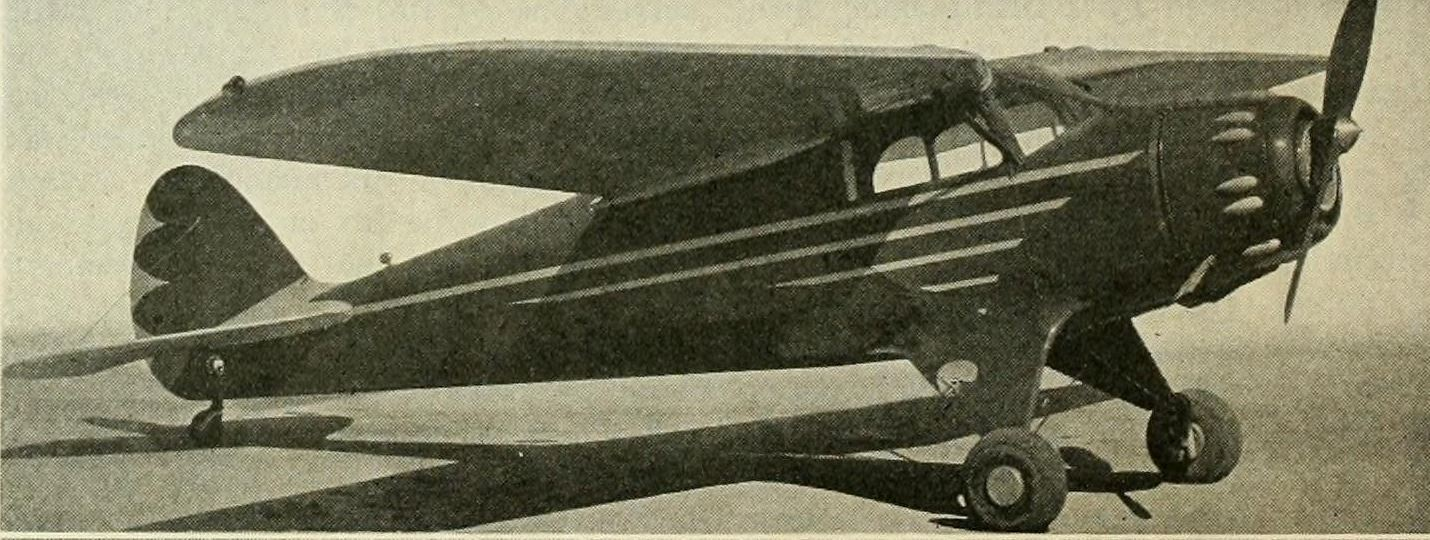
- Swanson-Fahlin SF-1 with Pobjoy engine

General information
- Type: Side-by-side two seat, cabin aircraft
- National origin: United States
- Designer: Swen Swanson and Ole Fahlin
- Number built: 1

History
- First flight: 1934
- Developed from: Swanson Coupe
- Variant: Swanson-Fahlin SF-2

The Swanson-Fahlin SF-1 was a high wing, two seat cabin aircraft with a small radial engine, designed in the United States and first flown in 1934. Only one was built.

== Design and development ==
At the start of the collaboration between Swen Swanson and Ole Fahlin, Swanson had already designed several aircraft and Fahlin was better known for propeller design. Lacking manufacturing space of their own, and as they had chosen to design a smaller, less powerful development of the Swanson Coupe light aircraft around a Pobjoy engine, the facilities of the U.S. Pobjoy distributors, Nicholas-Beazely, provided a natural space for its construction.

The SF-1 was a high, cantilever, gull wing cabin aircraft of all-wood and canvas construction. The wing was mounted on the fuselage according to Swanson's patented design, which left the central section over the cabin clear, with a short, strut-supported, high dihedral part of the wing immediately outboard. In plan the wings were straight-tapered, with an unswept leading edge and rounded tips.

Its air-cooled, seven cylinder, 80 hp (60 kW) Pobjoy R radial engine was supplied with its own long-chord cowling which was merged smoothly into the forward fuselage. Gearing off-set the propeller drive shaft upwards. Behind, the SF-1's cabin for two, sitting side-by-side, was under the wing and was accessed via external steps and wide doors. At the rear the tail was conventional, with a near-triangular fin and deep, rounded rudder and a tailplane mounted near the top of the fuselage. The elevators had a cut-out for rudder movement.

The SF-1's landing gear had independent legs with their struts enclosed in streamlined fairings and braced with streamlined tie-rods. Wheel track was 5 ft 8 in (1.73 m). A pneumatic tailwheel was mounted at the extreme rear fuselage.

== Operational history ==
The only SF-1 was first flown in 1934. Its subsequent history is uncertain, except that it was re-engined in about 1937 with a 85 hp (63 kW), flat-four Continental A-85.

== Variants ==
Swanson-Fahlin SF-2
An enlarged, more powerful variant with a Plymouth car engine.

== Specifications ==
Data from Aero Digest, July 1934

General characteristics

- Crew: one
- Capacity: one passenger
- Length: 21 ft 10 in (6.65 m)
- Wingspan: 28 ft (8.5 m)
- Height: 7 ft 4 in (2.24 m)
- Wing area: 144 sq ft (13.4 m^{2})
- Empty weight: 690 lb (313 kg)
- Gross weight: 1,190 lb (540 kg)
- Fuel capacity: 22 US gal (18 imp gal; 83 L)
- Powerplant: 1 × Pobjoy R seven cylinder, geared radial, 80 hp (60 kW) rated power, at 1,550 rpm
- Propellers: 2-bladed

Performance

- Maximum speed: 133 mph (214 km/h, 116 kn)
- Cruise speed: 105 mph (169 km/h, 91 kn)
- Landing speed: 40 mph (64 km/h; 35 kn)
- Landing run: 180 ft (55 m)
- Range: 575 mi (925 km, 500 nmi)
- Service ceiling: 19,000 ft (5,800 m)
- Rate of climb: 1,450 ft/min (7.4 m/s)
