= Arrow Aircraft and Motors =

Arrow Aircraft and Motor Corporation
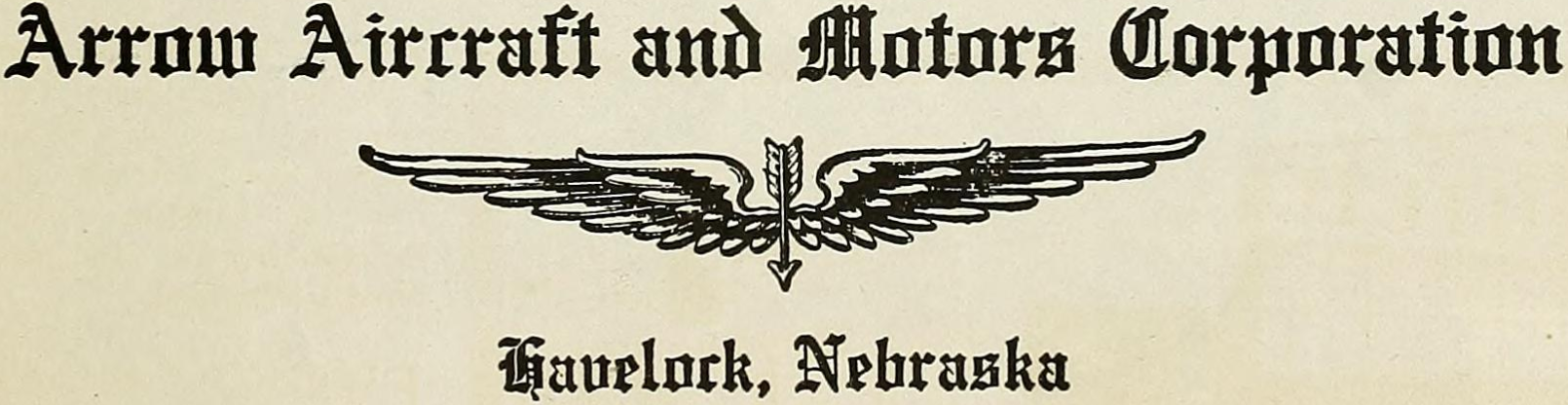
- Industry: Aerospace
- Founded: March 27, 1926
- Founders: John D. Moore; George E. Moore; Frederick J. Platz
- Defunct: 1939
- Fate: Bankrupt
- Headquarters: Havelock, Nebraska, United States
- Key people: Swen Swanson

Arrow Aircraft and Motor Corporation was an American aircraft manufacturer based in Havelock, Nebraska in the 1920s and 1930s. It built a variety of light sporting aircraft.

== History ==
The Arrow Aircraft Corporation founded on 27 March 1926 in Havelock, Nebraska by John D. Moore, George E. Moore, and Frederick J. Platz. In 1928, the Patriot Manufacturing Company, a truck body producer, was purchased and merged into the new entity, Arrow Aircraft and Motors. It began experimenting with using Ford V8 engines in aircraft in 1934. However, by 1939 the company was bankrupt, a consequence of the effect of the Great Depression, and cost overruns with LeBlond engines. Despite a hope that the increase in defense manufacturing – including a contract with Boeing – might save the company, its assets were later sold at two sheriff's sales in 1940.

== Aircraft ==
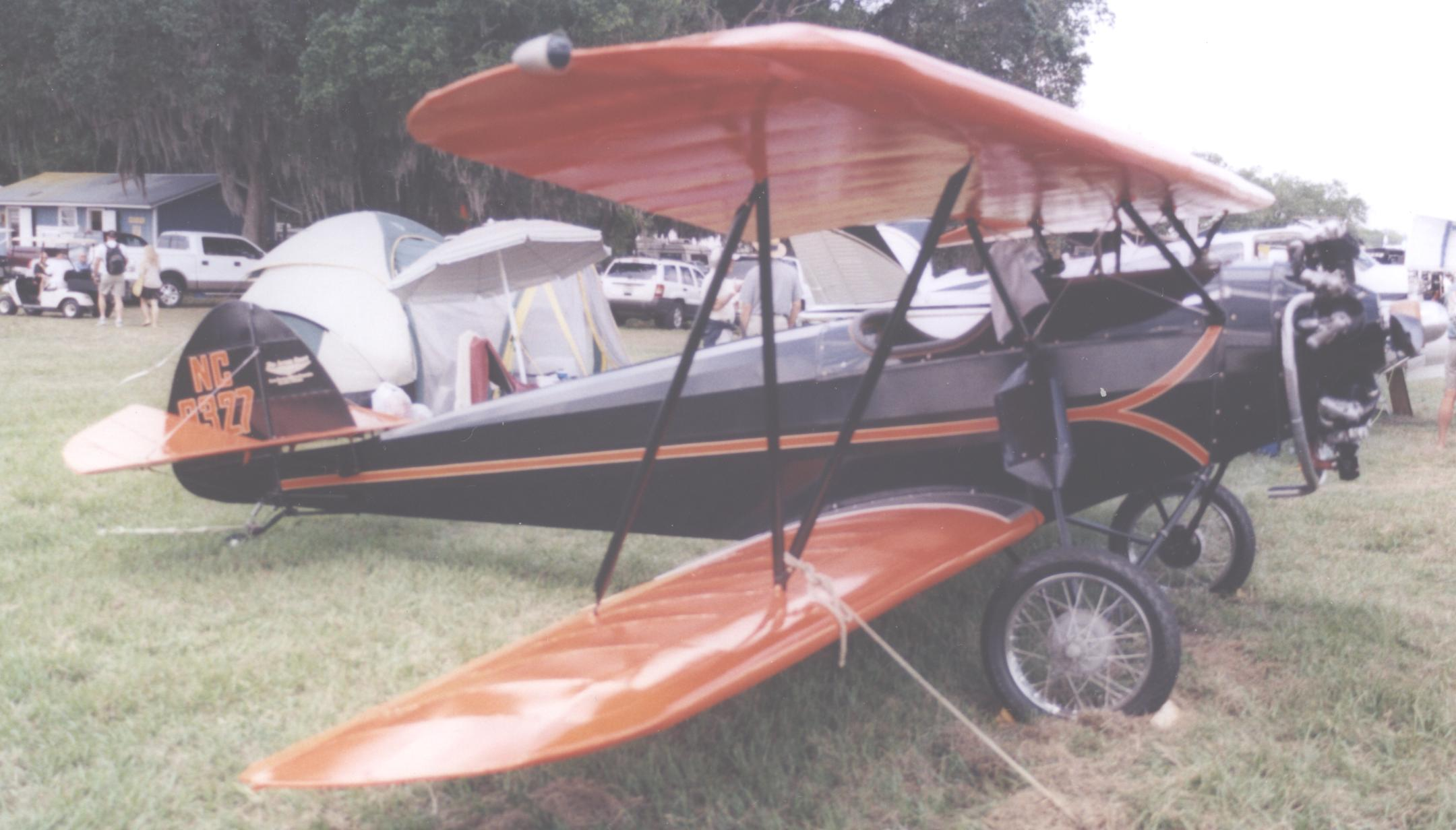
Arrow Sport

Model name	First flight	Number built	Type
Arrow Sport	1926	~100	Single engine two seat biplane
Arrow Model F	1934	103	Single engine two seat monoplane

== See also ==
- History of Lincoln, Nebraska
