= Swallow OX-5 Swallow =

Swallow OX-5 Swallow might refer to one of two related biplane models of the 1920s powered by Curtiss OX-5 engines, either:

- the Swallow Airplane Swallow, a wooden-framed aircraft of 1924 or
- the Swallow Super Swallow, a steel-framed aircraft of 1927, derived from the earlier design.
