= Swanson Coupe =

Swanson Coupe Model W-15
- Swanson Coupe

General information
- Type: Light aircraft
- National origin: United States
- Manufacturer: Swanson Aircraft Company Inc.
- Designer: Swen Swanson
- Status: Production completed

History
- Introduction date: 1931

The Swanson Coupe Model W-15 was a high-wing, cantilever-type monoplane produced in 1931 by Swedish aircraft designer and manufacturer Swen Swanson. Its design was considered innovative and the aircraft was viewed as part of a trend of producing safe and economical airplanes, which would appeal especially to automobile drivers. The Swanson Coupe was also designed to function as trainer aircraft.

== Design and development ==
Swanson's design of the Kari-Keen Coupe monoplane incorporated his trademark seating design of two people in side-by-side configuration which was unusual at the time. Following the first version of the Kari Keen Coupe, Swanson designed the Kari-Keen 90, an improved version. But the Kari-Keen factory fell victim to the Great Depression and by early 1930 it closed its doors. Swanson did not wait for long and left Kari-Keen to devote his time to the design of his Swanson Coupe W-15.

The cockpit of W-15

In 1931, after he left Kari-Keen, Swanson established the Swanson Aircraft Co. Inc. with headquarters at Hopewell, Virginia, and built the Swanson Coupe W-15 whose design incorporated new breakthroughs such as a new type of patented wing mounting structure which enabled unobstructed view from the cockpit to both pilot and passenger even from above their heads. The new wing mounting technique also increased the peripheral field of view of the cabin. This was accomplished by eliminating an extra wing span which used to enter the cabin area and obstruct the ceiling of the cockpit thus limiting the overhead field of vision. The Swanson Coupe Model W-15 has been described as "beautiful", and its cantilever wing design has been called "ingenious". The plane was certified by the United States Department of Commerce and was powered by the Warner Scarab engine, which produced 85 h.p. at 1950 rpm.

The Kari-Keen Coupe and the Swanson Coupe featured the characteristic Swanson cantilever wing design. The Swanson planes also shared a similar seating configuration; the two-passengers were seated beside each other. Model W-15 featured detachable passenger-side controls which could be mounted or removed depending on whether a student pilot was present. This design feature made the plane suitable for use in flight schools. The cabin windshield was made using safety glass and the door window panes were retractable. The plane had two variants: Standard and Deluxe. Both variants had dual flight controls, low pressure tires and mohair interior. Both models featured dual engine throttle controls: the main throttle control and a secondary throttle control button installed on the brake lever. The Deluxe came with an electric starter and more elaborate instrumentation. The prices were $4,450 for the Standard model and $4,985 for the Deluxe.

== Impact ==
Swanson did not have any commercial success with his Swanson Coupe. He subsequently decided to dissolve his aircraft company and went to the midwest to join the aircraft company of his friend Ole Fahlin. The Swanson Coupe became the basis of the first airplane produced jointly by them, the Fahlin SF-1. The Swanson Coupe was mentioned in a 1931 article of The Tuscaloosa News as an example of a closed-cabin, safe and economical airplane which was intended for use by "average men" who also drive cars.

== Specifications (W-15) ==
Data from Flying Magazine. May 1931

General characteristics

- Crew: one
- Capacity: one passenger
- Length: 25 ft 0 in (7.62 m)
- Wingspan: 34 ft 4 in (10.46 m)
- Height: 7 ft 7 in (2.31 m)
- Empty weight: 1,400 lb (635 kg)
- Gross weight: 2,050 lb (930 kg)
- Fuel capacity: 40 U.S. gallons (150 L; 33 imp gal)
- Powerplant: 1 × Warner Scarab , 110 hp (82 kW)

Performance

- Maximum speed: 125 mph (201 km/h, 109 kn)
- Cruise speed: 90 mph (140 km/h, 78 kn)
- Range: 625 mi (1,006 km, 543 nmi)
- Service ceiling: 16,000 ft (4,900 m)
- Rate of climb: 700 ft/min (3.6 m/s)
