= Arrow Sport =

Early biplane

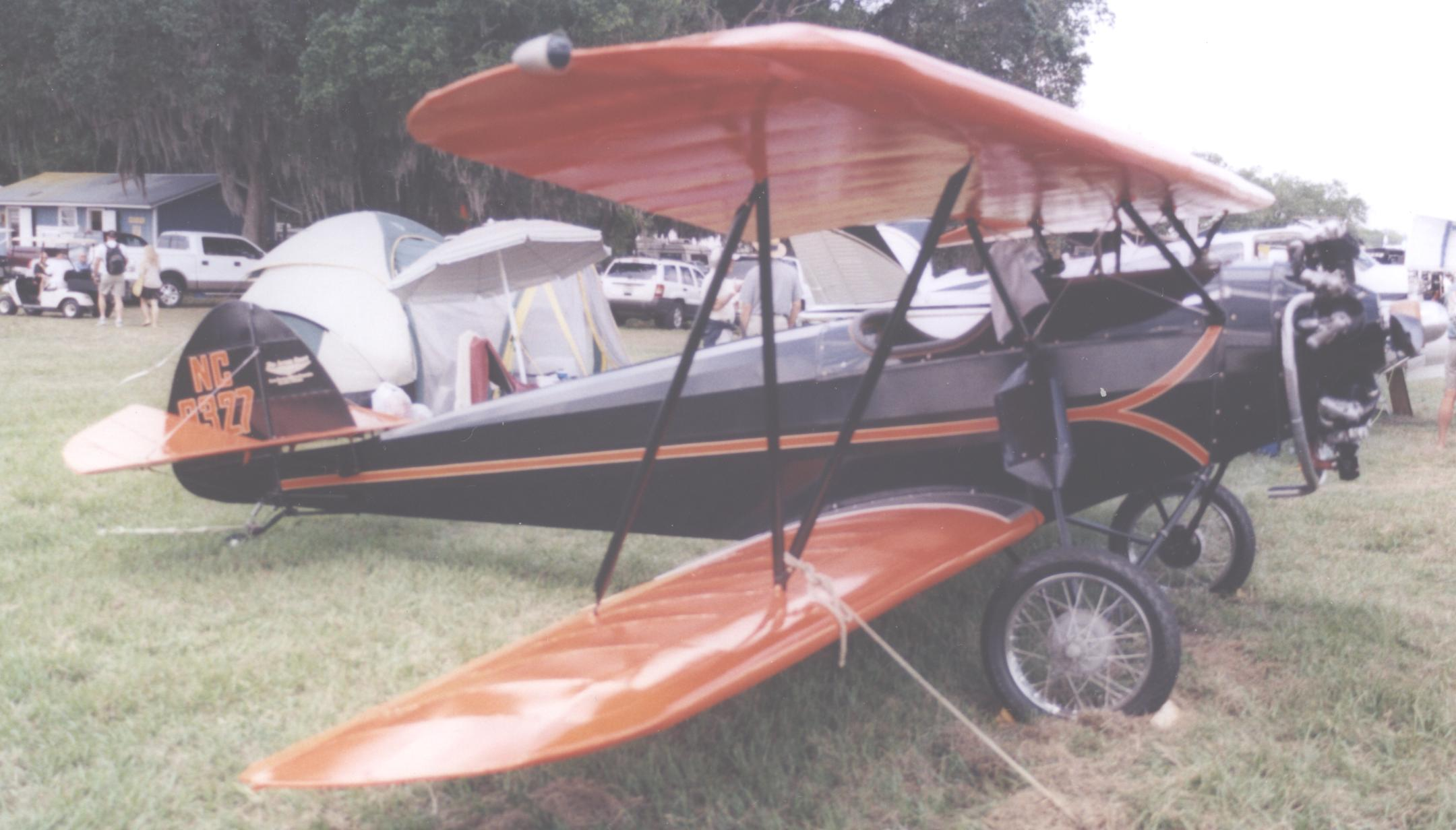
- Arrow Sport of 1927 at Lakeland, Florida, in April 2007

General information
- Type: Sports plane
- Manufacturer: Arrow Aircraft and Motors
- Designer: Sven Swanson
- Number built: ca. 100

History
- First flight: 1926

The Arrow Sport is a two-seat sporting biplane aircraft built in the United States in the 1920s and 1930s.

== Design and construction ==
The plane was designed by Swen Swanson and it was of largely conventional configuration with tailskid undercarriage, but was interesting in that the pilot and passenger sat side by side in the open cockpit, and because as originally designed, the fully cantilever wings lacked interplane struts – the upper wing attaching directly to the top of the fuselage. This latter feature proved so alarming to many prospective pilots that the manufacturer later supplied N-type struts that were of no real function other than to allay the aviators' fears.

== Variants ==
- Sport – Two-seat sporting biplane, powered by a 60-hp (45-kW) LeBlond radial piston engine.
- Sport 85 – 85 hp Leblond radial, extra four degrees of dihedral on lower wing.
- Sport A2
  - Sport A2-40
  - Sport A2-60 60 hp (45 kW) LeBlond radial engines
  - Sport A2-66
  - Sport A2-90 Tangerine
  - Sport A2-100 100 hp (75 kW) Kinner C-5
- Sport Pursuit (renamed Sport K in 1935) – Improved version, powered by a 100-hp (75-kW) Kinner K-5 radial engine.
- Sport V-8 (renamed the Model F) – Two-seat monoplane version, powered by a converted 82 hp (61 kW) Ford V8 automobile engine.
  - Sport M – Model F with a 125 hp (93 kW) Menasco C-4 Pirate engine.

== Surviving aircraft ==
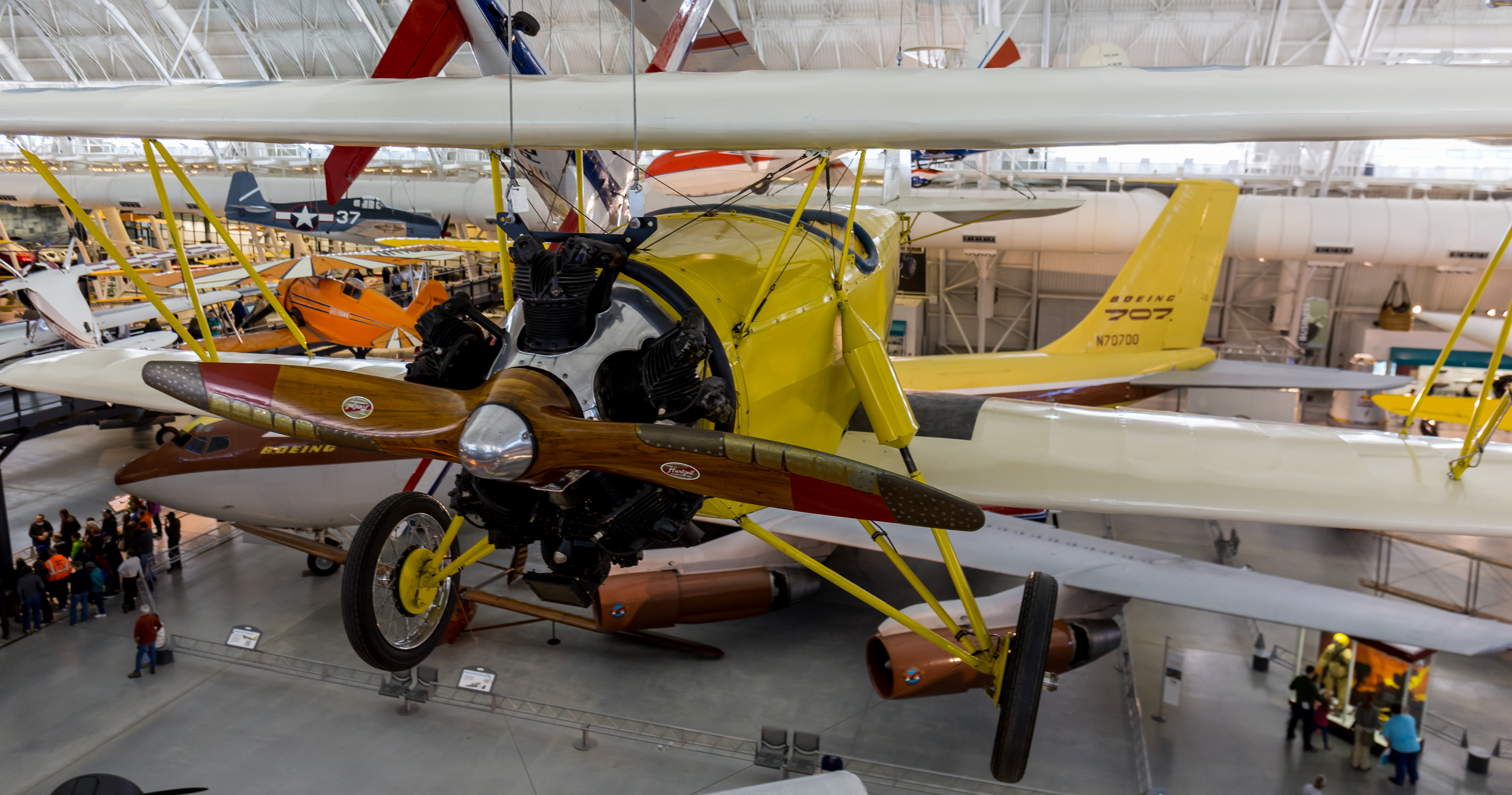
An Arrow Sport A2-60 at the Udvar-Hazy Center.

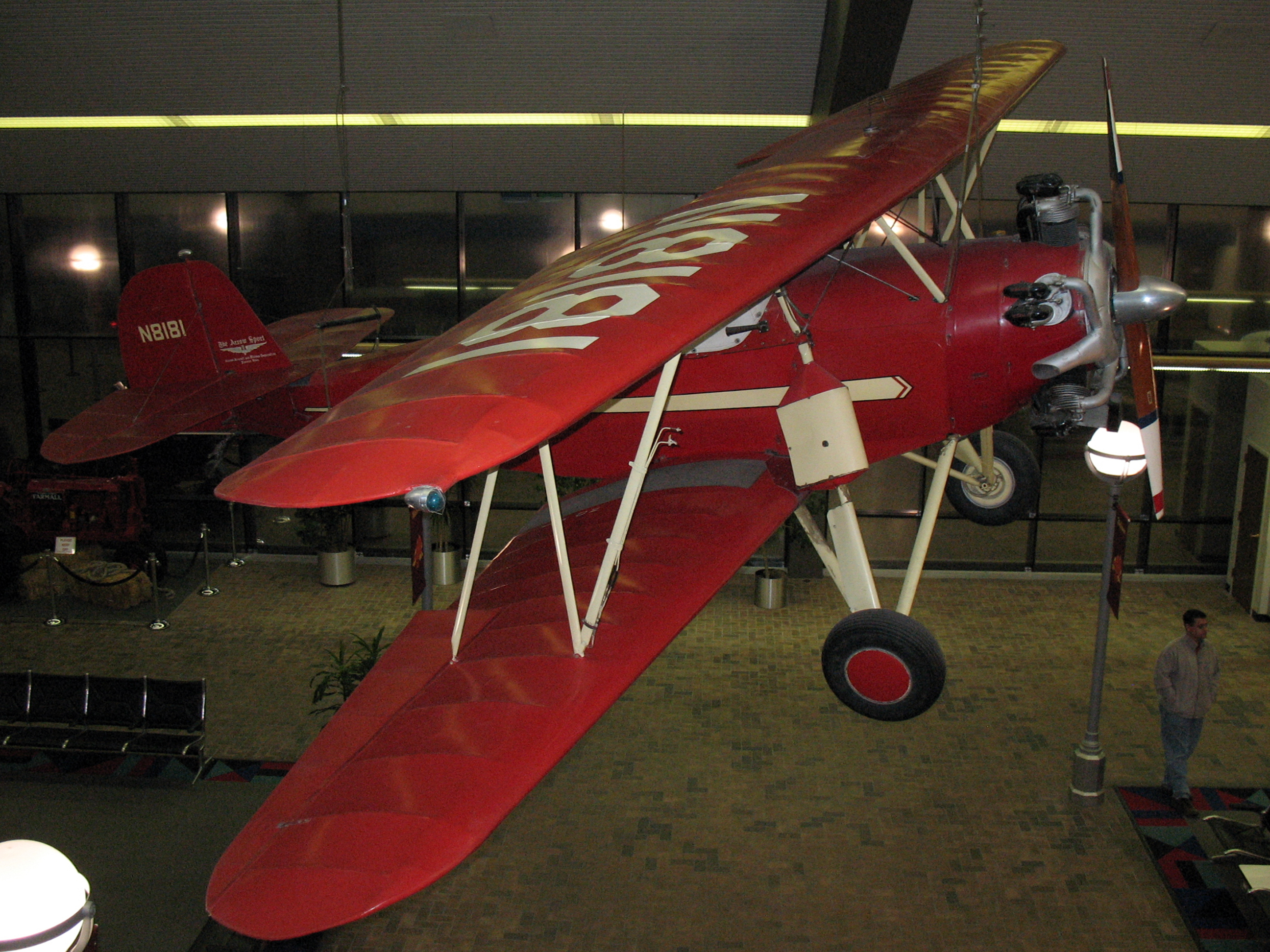
Arrow Sport at the Lincoln Airport, Lincoln, Nebraska, USA

Nine biplane Sports remain registered in the United States as of 2020, mostly in museums and private collections, including:

- a Sport Pursuit (N8181, serial 432) preserved in the terminal building of the Lincoln Airport in Nebraska, Arrow's city of manufacture, and owned by the Nebraska State Historical Society.
- a Sport (N530A, serial 304) preserved at the Dakota Territory Air Museum in North Dakota.
- a Sport A2-60 (ex-N9325/G-AARO, serial 341) preserved at the National Air and Space Museum in Washington, D.C.
- a Sport Pursuit (N853H, serial 412) is on display at the Western Antique Aeroplane & Automobile Museum in Oregon.

== Specifications (A2-60) ==
Data from American airplane specifications

General characteristics

- Crew: 1
- Capacity: 1 passenger
- Length: 19 ft 3 in (5.87 m)
- Wingspan: 25 ft 10 in (7.87 m)
- Height: 7 ft 5 in (2.26 m)
- Wing area: 183 sq ft (17.0 m^{2})
- Empty weight: 900 lb (408 kg)
- Gross weight: 1,346 lb (611 kg)
- Powerplant: 1 × LeBlond 5D radial engine, 60 hp (45 kW)

Performance

- Maximum speed: 100 mph (160 km/h, 87 kn)
- Cruise speed: 85 mph (137 km/h, 74 kn)
- Stall speed: 30 mph (48 km/h, 26 kn)
- Range: 200 mi (320 km, 170 nmi)
- Service ceiling: 14,000 ft (4,300 m)

== See also ==
Aircraft of comparable role, configuration, and era

- Warren CP-2
