= Kari-Keen Manufacturing =

Former American aircraft manufacturer

Kari-Keen Manufacturing Company
- Industry: Aerospace; Automotive
- Successor: Sioux Aircraft Corporation
- Headquarters: Sioux City, Iowa, United States

Kari-Keen Manufacturing Company was an American aircraft manufacturer and producer of automotive luggage.

Kari-Keen's automotive product line included the Kari-Keen Kairrier automotive trunks and beds designed by Paul Lier and patented in 1925. Production started in Leeds, Iowa. In 1937, the automotive division ceased operations.

Kari-Keen also operated a flight school to operate their aircraft, the Kari-Keen School of Aviation. In 1930 C.F. Lytle bought the assets of the aviation branch and formed Sioux aircraft. Only three new prototype models were built, and they retained the Kari-Keen logo on the tail.

== Aircraft ==
Model name	First flight	Number built	Type
Kari-Keen 60 Sioux coupe	1929	22	Single engine monoplane
Kari-Keen 90 Sioux coupe	1930	6	Single engine monoplane
Kari-Keen 90A Sioux coupe	1933	1	Single engine monoplane
Kari-Keen 90B Sioux coupe	1931	1	Single engine monoplane
Kari-Keen 90C Sioux coupe	1931	1	Single engine monoplane
