= Kari-Keen 90 Sioux Coupe =

Sioux Coupe
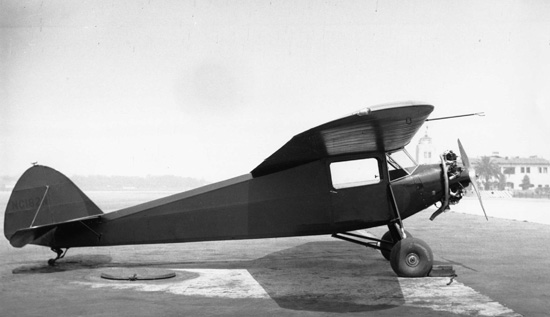

General information
- Type: Sport monoplane
- National origin: United States
- Manufacturer: Kari-Keen Aircraft Corp, Sioux Aircraft Corporation
- Designer: Swen Swanson
- Number built: 32

History
- Manufactured: 1929-1933

The Kari-Keen 90 Sioux coupe is a two-seat cabin monoplane.

== Development ==
Kari-Keen was an automotive luggage producer that started in the growing aviation business in 1929. Production of the Sioux coupe began in 1929 and ended on 1 August 1933. The first model, the Kari-Keen 60 Sioux Coup, featured a 60 hp (45 kW) Velie M-5 engine. 22 aircraft were built without a type certificate. In 1930, six more model 90s were built with a type certificate. In 1931, the Sioux Aircraft Corporation bought the company assets, changing the name of the Kari-Keen 90 into the Sioux Coupe 90.

== Design ==
The Kari-Keen 90 Sioux Coupe was designed by Swen Swanson and was a two-seat side-by-side high-wing monoplane with conventional landing gear. The wing was fully cantilevered, with skylights built in. The fuel tank sat above the pilot's head and was part of the leading edge. Ole Fahlin built all the propellers and test-flew the aircraft.

== Variants ==
Kari-Keen 60 Sioux coupe
Sioux Coupe 90
Lambert R-266 radial engine 90 hp.
Sioux Coupe 90A
powered with a 90 hp Brownback Tiger
Sioux Coupe 90B Junior
powered with a 90 hp Warner Scarab Junior - one built
Sioux Coupe 90C Senior
powered with a 110 hp Warner Scarab - one built

== Aircraft on display ==
- In 1988, a restored Kari-Keen 60 Sioux Coupe won Champion Antique at the 1988 EAA Oshkosh Airshow. This aircraft is now stored at the Reynolds-Alberta Museum.
- A Kari-Keen 90 Sioux Coupe is on display at the Iowa Aviation Museum
- A Kari-Keen 90A Sioux Coupe is on display at the Sioux City Public Museum, last flown in 2004.

== Specifications (Kari-Keen 90-C Sioux coupe) ==
Data from FAA TCDS, Sport Aviation

General characteristics

- Crew: one
- Capacity: one passenger
- Wing area: 150 sq ft (14 m^{2})
- Airfoil: Eieffel 385
- Gross weight: 1,580 lb (717 kg)
- Fuel capacity: 25 US gallons (95 L; 21 imp gal)
- Powerplant: 1 × Warner Scarab Radial, 110 hp (82 kW)
- Propellers: 2-bladed Ole Fahlin

Performance

- Cruise speed: 66 kn (76 mph, 122 km/h)

== See also ==
Aircraft of comparable role, configuration, and era

- Monocoupe 90
- Star Cavalier
