= Swallow Aeroplane Company Swallow =

Ultralight aircraft

Swallow

General information
- Type: Ultralight aircraft
- National origin: United States
- Manufacturer: Swallow Aeroplane Company
- Designer: Chet Fudge
- Status: Production completed

The Swallow Aeroplane Company Swallow is a series of American ultralight aircraft that was designed by Chet Fudge and produced by the Swallow Aeroplane Company in the 1980s. The aircraft was supplied as a kit for amateur construction.

The Swallow Aeroplane Company should not be confused with the 1920s era Swallow Airplane Company.

== Design and development ==
The aircraft was designed to comply with the US FAR 103 Ultralight Vehicles rules, including the category's maximum empty weight of 254 lb (115 kg). When equipped with a lightweight Rotax 277 engine the aircraft has a standard empty weight of 253 lb (115 kg). It features a cable-braced high-wing, a single-seat, open cockpit, tricycle landing gear and one or two engines in pusher configuration.

The aircraft is made from bolted-together aluminum tubing, with the flying surfaces covered in Dacron sailcloth. Its 34.4 ft (10.5 m) span wing is cable-braced from an inverted "V" kingpost. The pilot is accommodated on an open seat, without a windshield. The aircraft controls are conventional three-axis. The engine or engines are mounted to the wing leading edge and drive the propeller, located at the trailing edge and in between the tail boom tubes, through an extension shaft. Some Swallows used an unusual tubular engine fairing.

== Variants ==
Swallow A
Initial version, powered by a single Rotax 277 of 28 hp (21 kW) or a pair of Yamaha KT-100 engines of 15 hp (11 kW) each, coupled together to a common combining gearbox and powering a single propeller. The "A" model has a standard empty weight of 253 lb (115 kg) and if built carefully can qualify as a US FAR 103 ultralight.
Swallow B
Differs from the "A" only in engine installed, a single Cuyuna 430 of 30 hp (22 kW). The "B" model has a standard empty weight of 290 lb (132 kg) and is thus too heavy for the US FAR 103 ultralight category, but qualifies as an Experimental Amateur-Built.

== Specifications (Swallow B) ==
Data from Cliche and the Virtual Ultralight Museum

General characteristics

- Crew: one
- Length: 18 ft (5.5 m)
- Wingspan: 34 ft 3 in (10.44 m)
- Height: 8 ft (2.4 m)
- Wing area: 138 sq ft (12.8 m^{2})
- Empty weight: 290 lb (132 kg)
- Gross weight: 585 lb (265 kg)
- Fuel capacity: 3.8 U.S. gallons (14 L; 3.2 imp gal)
- Powerplant: 1 × Cuyuna 430 twin cylinder, two stroke aircraft engine, 30 hp (22 kW)

Performance

- Maximum speed: 70 mph (110 km/h, 61 kn)
- Cruise speed: 60 mph (97 km/h, 52 kn)
- Stall speed: 28 mph (45 km/h, 24 kn)
- Range: 137 mi (220 km, 119 nmi)
- g limits: +4/-3
- Maximum glide ratio: 8:1
- Rate of climb: 780 ft/min (4.0 m/s)
- Rate of sink: 550 ft/min (2.8 m/s)
