= Europa Aircraft =

British aircraft manufacturer

- Type: Limited company
- Industry: Aerospace
- Founded: 1987
- Headquarters: Scottow Enterprise Park (formerly RAF Coltishall), Norwich
- Products: kitplanes
- Parent: Swift Technology Group
- Website: www.europa-aircraft.co.uk

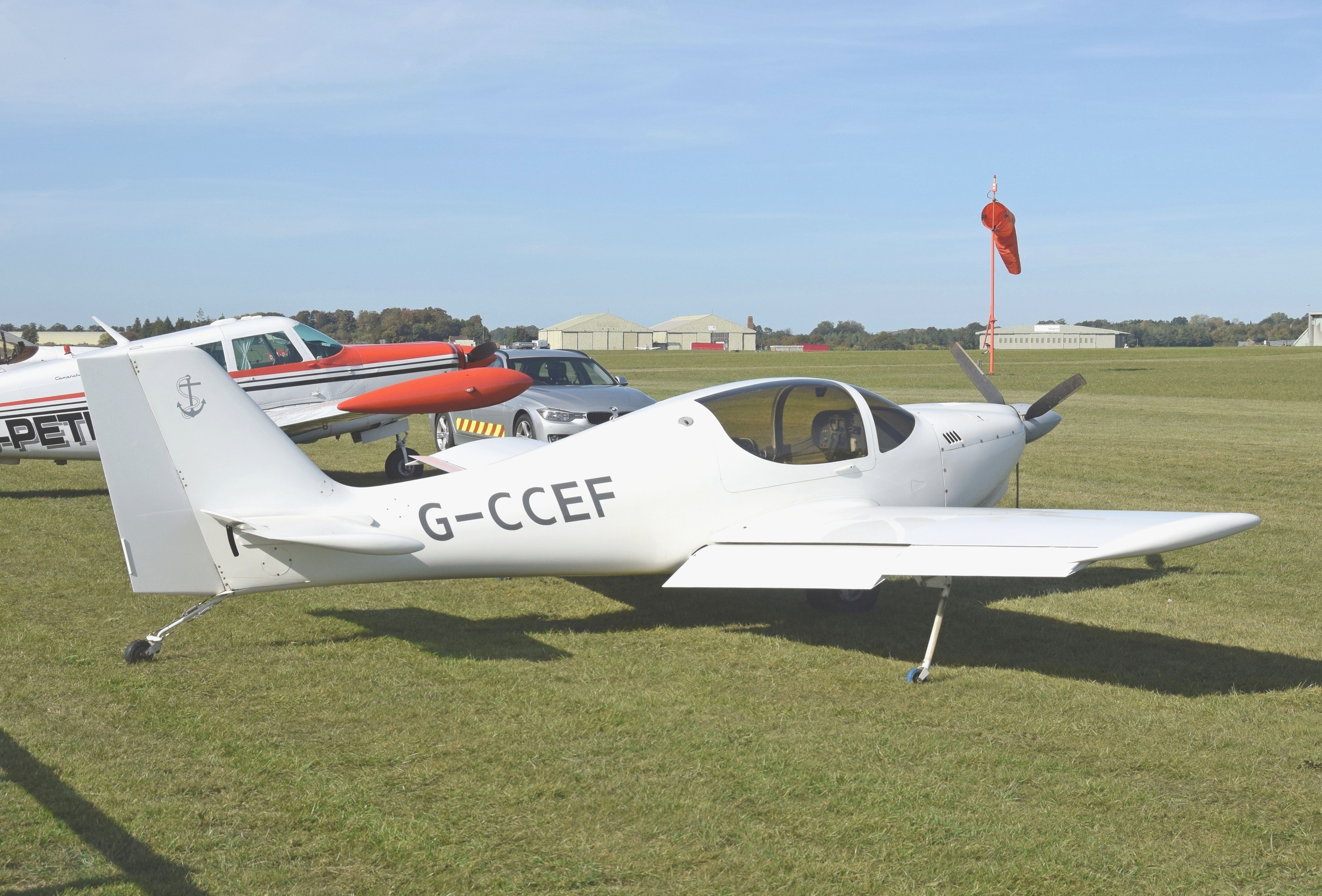
2004 Europa Classic kitplane, with retractable monowheel and retracting outriggers

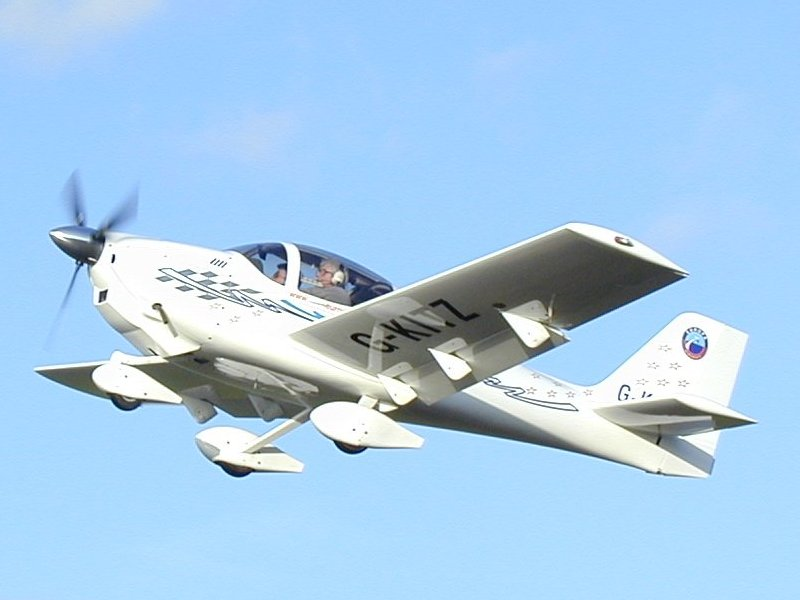
Europa XS

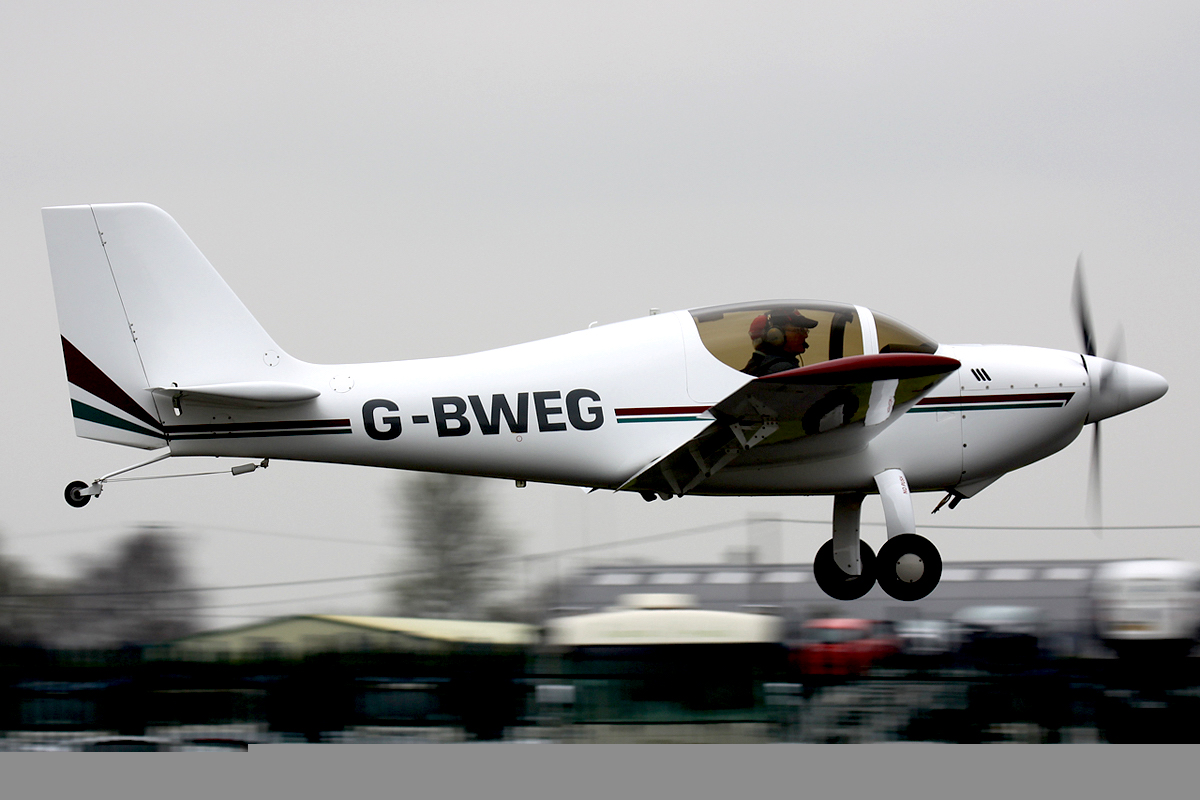
Europa taildragger

Europa Aircraft is a British kitplane manufacturer that produces the Europa XS.

The company was established to produce a small kit-built low-wing aircraft for personal use within Europe, with these design goals: high speed, low cost, able to be built and stored at home, easily transportable, using Mogas fuel, able to be rigged for flight in under five minutes, carrying two people in comfort, providing sufficient baggage for extended touring. Apart from "low cost", these design parameters were largely met.

== History ==
The original Europa, (the "Classic"), was designed by Ivan Shaw (born 1945) and the prototype, G-YURO, first flew in February 1992. Production of kit components was established at the company's factory in Kirkbymoorside, North Yorkshire.

In the early 1990s the company won a £100,000 grant from the UK Department of Trade and Industry in recognition of its technical achievements. Europa Aircraft has grown to be one of the most successful British kit plane suppliers, with over 700 Europas flying in 33 countries. The Europa XS was named as one of the UK's Millennium Products by the then Prime Minister Tony Blair, and described by Pilot magazine as "the most significant light plane of the decade".

Ivan Shaw left Europa to develop the Europa-derivative Liberty XL2 production aircraft at a new company, Liberty Aerospace, in Melbourne, Florida, United States. After Shaw left, the firm faced considerable difficulties; but in September 2008, company fortunes improved as Europa Aircraft was acquired by British company, Swift Technology Group.

Europa Aircraft has existed under several company names, and the current name is Europa Aircraft (2004) Ltd. The manufacturing of the Europa range of aircraft is carried out by a sister company, Aviation and Marine Engineering Ltd. Other companies within the Group include Swift Aircraft, Swift TG Maintenance, Swift TG Solutions and Aviation, Swift TG Energy and TWF Solutions.

Europa Elite

In 2020, Europa Aircraft announced the launch of a new tri-gear kit aircraft design, the Europa Elite. The design will fit into the EASA CS-VLA category and will be of all composite construction, with two seats in side-by-side configuration. While having a broadly similar specification to the original Europa, the planned Elite differs with a T-tail, Spitfire-type ellipsoidal wings and tailplane, a "swoopier" teardrop-shaped fuselage, giving better rearward vision from within the cockpit.
