= Swallow TP =

1920s American trainer aircraft

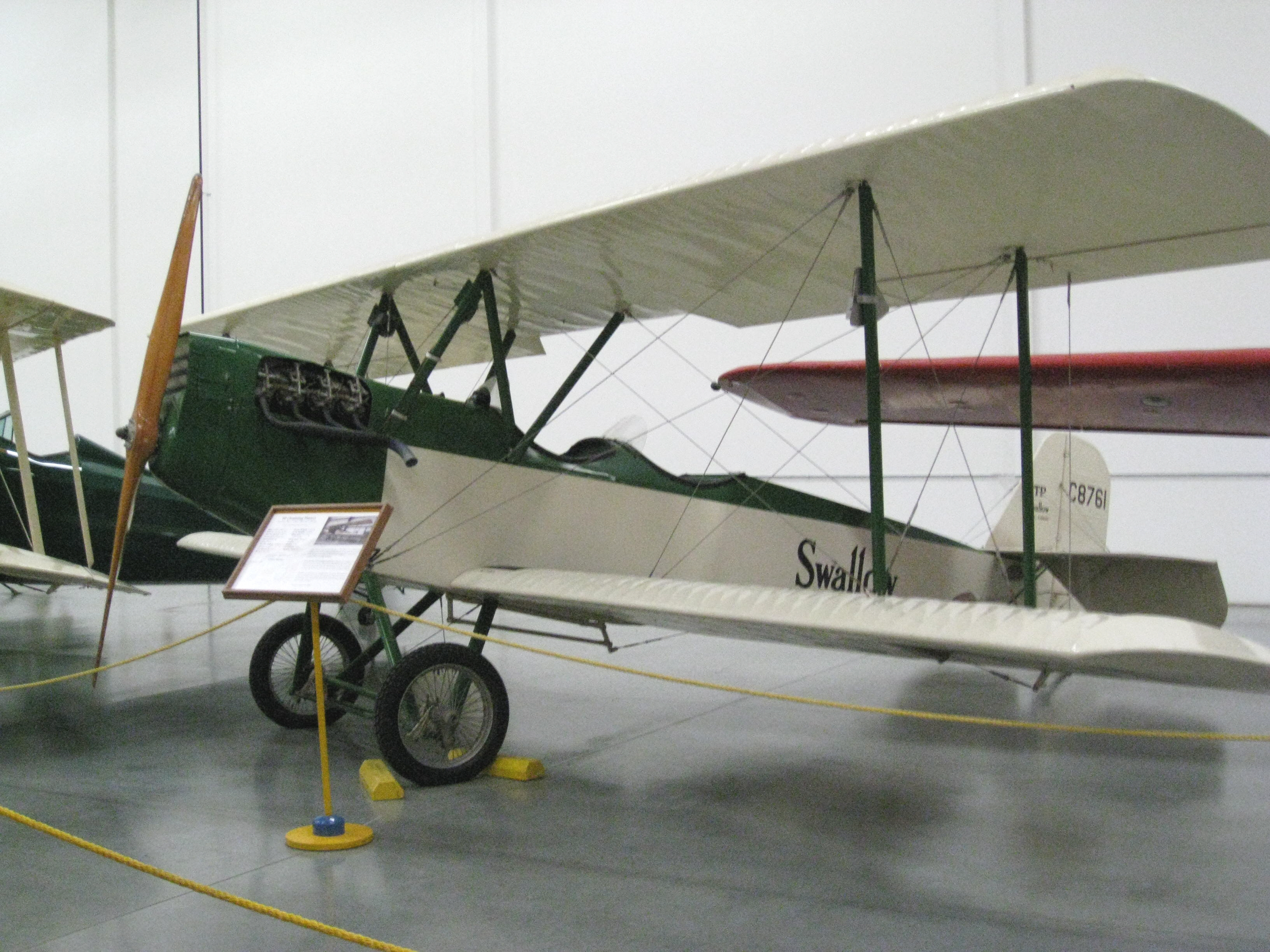
- Swallow TP at Yanks Air Museum Chino California

General information
- Type: Trainer
- National origin: United States
- Manufacturer: Swallow
- Designer: Amos O. Payne
- Number built: ~200

History
- First flight: 1928

The Swallow TP was a trainer aircraft produced by the Swallow Airplane Company in the United States from 1928.

== Design and construction ==
The TP was a simple and rugged biplane design with room for an instructor and student in tandem open cockpits. The fuselage was made from welded steel tubing, faired to shape and then fabric covered. The wings were typical of the day with Spruce spars, spruce & plywood ribs with fabric covering. Built to be easy to fly, and for ease of maintenance, the Swallow TP was quite popular with nearly 200 being built. Initially the TP was offered with the ubiquitous Curtiss OX-5. Later, it was offered with a choice of a Siemens-Halske, Kinner, or Warner engines. Most customers opted for the OX-5 which was the cheapest.

== Variants ==
Data from:Aerofiles

TP
Main production variant with a Curtiss OX-5 engine, about 200 built.
TP-K
Production variant with a five-cylinder Kinner K-5 engine, 20 to 25 built.
TP-W
Production variant with a seven-cylinder Warner Scarab engine, three built
TP-Sh
Production variant with seven-cylinder Siemens-Halske Sh 14 engine.

== Specifications (Swallow TP) ==
Data from U.S. Civil Aircraft Vol.2

General characteristics

- Crew: 1
- Capacity: 1
- Length: 23 ft 7 in (7.19 m)
- Wingspan: 30 ft 11 in (9.42 m)
- Height: 8 ft 10 in (2.69 m)
- Wing area: 296 sq ft (27.5 m^{2})
- Empty weight: 1,283 lb (582 kg)
- Gross weight: 1,825 lb (828 kg)
- Powerplant: 1 × Curtiss OX-5 V-8 water-cooled piston engine, 90 hp (67 kW)

Performance

- Maximum speed: 90 mph (140 km/h, 78 kn)
- Cruise speed: 75 mph (121 km/h, 65 kn)
- Stall speed: 33 mph (53 km/h, 29 kn)
- Range: 300 mi (480 km, 260 nmi) +
- Service ceiling: 15,499 ft (4,724 m)
- Rate of climb: 650 ft/min (3.3 m/s)
