= Swing-Europe =

German aircraft manufacturer

Swing-Europe Paraplanes
- Company type: Privately held company
- Industry: Aerospace
- Founded: early 2000s
- Founder: Oliver Münzer and Jörg Roth
- Headquarters: Freiburg, Germany
- Products: Powered parachutes
- Website: luftmofa.com

Swing-Europe Paraplanes is a German aircraft manufacturer based in Freiburg and formerly located in Ebringen. Founded by Oliver Münzer and Jörg Roth, the company specializes in the design and manufacture of powered parachutes in the form ready-to-fly aircraft for the US FAR 103 Ultralight Vehicles and the European Fédération Aéronautique Internationale microlight categories.

The company's sole product is the Swing-Europe Parashell, also just called Das Trike (English: the trike), which was designed by Münzer in the early 2000s. The aircraft is a single-seat powered parachute that has an unusual composite material cockpit fairing. The design was described by reviewer Jean-Pierre le Camus in 2003, as "beautiful" and having "visual flair".

The company's website name, luftmofa, means "air moped".

== Aircraft ==
Summary of aircraft built by Swing-Europe
| Model name | First flight | Number built | Type |
|---|---|---|---|
| Swing-Europe Parashell | early 2000s | | Single-seat powered parachute |
