= Swallow Model C Coupé =

American-built general purpose monoplane of the mid 1930s

Model C Coupé

General information
- Type: General purpose monoplane
- National origin: United States
- Manufacturer: Swallow Aircraft Company
- Designer: E. B. Christopher

History
- First flight: January 1936

The Swallow Model C Coupé is an American-built general-purpose high-wing monoplane of the mid 1930s. E. B. Christopher, Swallow Aircraft Company president and designer of the Model C, was killed in the crash of an early example that he was flying.

== Design and development ==
The Model C is a high-wing, strut-braced monoplane of conventional configuration with an enclosed cabin and fixed tailwheel undercarriage. Seating is provided for the pilot and one passenger, side-by-side, and the cabin is equipped with dual controls. Power is supplied by a Menasco C-4 air-cooled inverted inline engine, driving a two-bladed propeller.

The fuselage and tail is built from welded steel tube, covered in fabric. The wing is of mixed wood and metal construction, also covered in fabric. Long V-struts braced the wings to the lower longeron of the fuselage.

== Operational history ==
The Model C first flew in January 1936. In April 1937, Swallow company president E. B. Christopher, who had designed the aircraft, exhibited an example at an air show in Los Angeles. On April 9, he departed with it, heading to San Francisco with a single passenger aboard, investment broker E. A. Grumm. Grumm was reportedly interested in arranging finance for Swallow to manufacture the Model C. According to witnesses, the aircraft was struggling against a headwind as it attempted to navigate Tejon Pass at less than 100 ft (30 m) altitude. A sudden downdraft blew the aircraft into a ridge, wrecking it and killing both men instantly.

Following the tragedy, Swallow's new president, Sam Bloomfied, still intended marketing the Model C as late as September 1937.

== Specifications ==
Data from Grey & Bridgman 1938, p.303

General characteristics

- Crew: 1
- Capacity: 1 passenger
- Length: 24 ft 4 in (7.42 m)
- Wingspan: 36 ft 8 in (11.18 m)
- Height: 7 ft 3 in (2.21 m)
- Wing area: 189 sq ft (17.6 m^{2})
- Empty weight: 1,350 lb (612 kg)
- Gross weight: 1,980 lb (898 kg)
- Powerplant: 1 × Menasco C-4 4-cylinder, air-cooled inverted inline piston, 125 hp (93 kW)

Performance

- Maximum speed: 145 mph (233 km/h, 126 kn)
- Cruise speed: 135 mph (217 km/h, 117 kn)
- Range: 450 mi (720 km, 390 nmi)
- Service ceiling: 21,000 ft (6,400 m)
- Rate of climb: 850 ft/min (4.3 m/s) (initial)
- Wing loading: 15.8 lb/sq ft (77 kg/m^{2})
