= Arrow Model F =

Model F
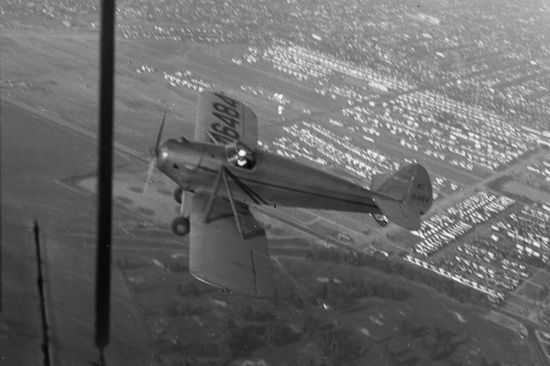

General information
- Type: Recreational aircraft
- Manufacturer: Arrow Aircraft and Motor Corporation
- Number built: 103

History
- First flight: 1934

The Arrow Model F or the Arrow Sport V-8 was a two-seat low-wing braced monoplane aircraft built in the United States between 1934 and 1938. It was built originally to a request by the US Bureau of Air Commerce to investigate the feasibility of using automobile engines to power aircraft. Accordingly, the Model F was fitted with a modified Ford V8 engine. Like the Arrow Sport before it, the Model F seated its pilot and passenger side-by-side in an open cockpit and was marketed for $1500.

== Development ==
The Arrow Sport F was specifically built to accommodate the low-cost, yet heavy Arrow F V-8 engine, an aircraft modification of the Ford V-8. The engine was designed by Ford Engineer David E. Anderson with an aluminum oil pan, aluminum cylinders, and a 2:1 gear reduction to drive the prop at reasonable rpm ranges. The engine weighed 402 lbs for 85 hp vrs 182 lbs for an equivalent Continental aircraft engine.

== Variants ==
- Arrow Sport F Master – Open cockpit
- Arrow Sport F Coupe – Closed cockpit variant
- Arrow Sport F De Lux Coupe – Closed cockpit with advanced instruments.
- Arrow Sport M - Open cockpit with a Menasco Pirate engine.

== Surviving aircraft ==
- A preserved Sport F Master (ex-NC18722, serial 85) is on display at San Francisco International Airport's Terminal 3.
- A disassembled Sport F is being rebuilt by the Dakota Territory Air Museum in North Dakota.
- A Sport M (N18764, serial 105) is private ownership.
- Two Sport F's (N17093, serial 13 & N18765, serial 106) preserved at the Western Antique Aeroplane & Automobile Museum in Oregon.
- A Sport F (N18018, serial 31) in private ownership in California.
- A 1936 Sport Model F (NC16470 Serial 2) preserved at the Mid-Atlantic Air Museum at Reading Regional Airport in Reading, Pennsylvania.
- A disassembled Sport F (N18000) is being rebuilt by The Nebraska Chapter of the Antique Airplane Association in Hastings Nebraska

== Specifications ==
Data from American Airplanes and Engines for 1938

General characteristics

- Crew: 1
- Capacity: 1 passenger
- Length: 21 ft 4 in (6.50 m)
- Wingspan: 36 ft 7 in (11.15 m)
- Height: 8 ft 10 in (2.69 m)
- Wing area: 180.5 sq ft (16.77 m^{2})
- Empty weight: 1,097 lb (498 kg)
- Gross weight: 1,675 lb (760 kg)
- Fuel capacity: 20 US gal (17 imp gal; 76 L)
- Powerplant: 1 × Ford V-8 water-cooled converted automobile engine, 82 hp (61 kW)

Performance

- Maximum speed: 100 mph (160 km/h, 87 kn) at sea level
- Cruise speed: 90 mph (140 km/h, 78 kn)
- Stall speed: 40 mph (64 km/h, 35 kn)
- Range: 300 mi (480 km, 260 nmi)
- Service ceiling: 12,000 ft (3,700 m)
- Rate of climb: 800 ft/min (4.1 m/s)
