= Swallow LT65 =

Prototype American trainer aircraft of 1940

LT65
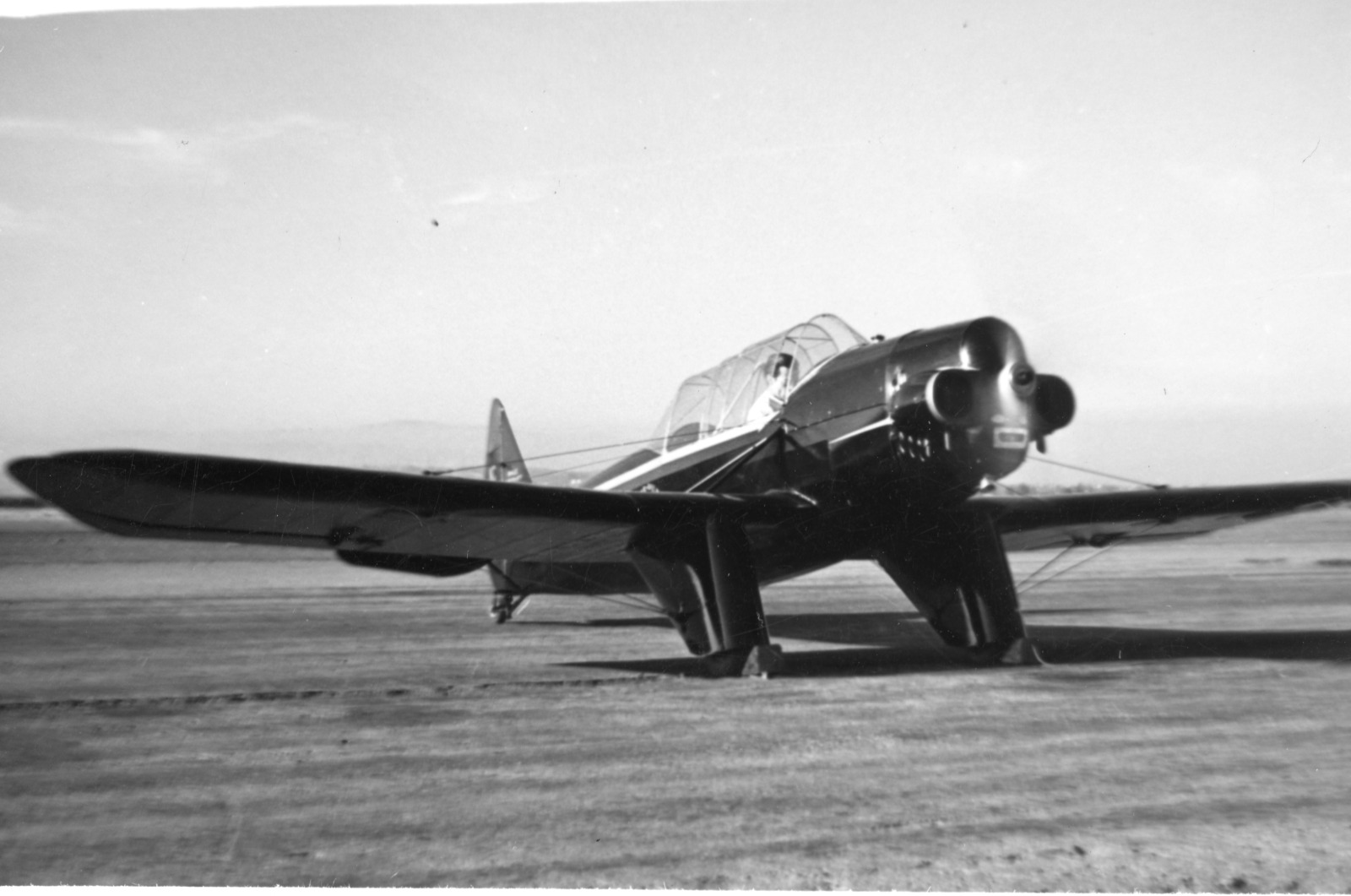

General information
- Type: Civil trainer
- National origin: United States
- Manufacturer: Swallow Airplane Company
- Designer: Harold Dale
- Number built: 2

History
- First flight: 1938

The Swallow LT65 or LT-65 was a trainer aircraft marketed by the Swallow Airplane Company in 1940. Swallow purchased the prototype from its builder, Dale Aircraft, but was unable to start manufacturing it before the demands of wartime production changed priorities for the company. This was Swallow's final attempt to produce an aircraft.

== Design ==
The LT65 was a conventional, low-wing-monoplane with seating for the pilot and instructor in tandem, fully enclosed under an extensively glazed canopy. The wings were braced to the fuselage by struts and wires, and by wires to the main units of the fixed, tailwheel undercarriage. Those units were fully enclosed by large spats. Power was supplied by a piston engine in the nose driving a tractor propeller. It had a conventional tail.

The fuselage, empennage, and center sections of the wings were constructed from welded steel tube, and the wing outer panels had spruce spars and ribs. The whole aircraft was covered in fabric.

== Development ==
Although Swallow's marketing of 1940 described the LT65 as "new" and "no re-hash of an old model", they had purchased the manufacturing rights and the prototype from the Dale Aircraft Company of Pomona, California, The Dale Aircraft Company logo is partially visible on Swallow's promotional picture of the type.

The first iteration of the design, the Dale A, registration NX18972 (later, NC18972) was powered by a 40-horsepower (30 kW) Continental A-40 engine. (Note: Aviation historian K. O. Eckland speculated that this aircraft might itself have been based on an earlier aircraft, the Alker Sport (one built, registration NC12872), but called this identification "unconfirmed". A 1962 feature article in Sport Aviation on the Air-Dale and its designer discusses the aircraft as if Dale designed and built it himself.)

When the 50-horsepower (37 kW) Menasco M-50 engine became available, designer Harold Dale built a second prototype to take advantage of it. This was called the Dale Air-Dale M-50, registration NC21736, and Dale entered a business partnership with George M. Frohlich and Roland J. Brownsberger to market it. It was offered in open-cockpit and canopied versions.

Swallow bought this second prototype and the manufacturing rights to the design, hoping to market it to flying schools with a more powerful 65-horsepower (48 kW) Continental engine, dual controls, and provision for dual flight and engine instruments. It was marketed as being easy to fly, maintain, and overhaul. In 1941, Swallow was preparing for production of the type in a new factory with 40,000 square feet (3,700 m^{2}) of floorspace. However, the outbreak of World War II disrupted the civil aviation market, and diverted resources and manufacturing capacity. Swallow never sold any LT65s, and spent the war years training aircraft mechanics and manufacturing components for Boeing bombers.

== Variants ==
Dale A
First prototype, with Continental A-40 engine
Dale Air-Dale M-50
Second prototype, with Menasco M-50 engine
Swallow LT65
Second prototype offered for sale by Swallow with a 65-hp engine

== Specifications (LT65) ==
Data from Swallow Low-Wing Trainer 1940, p.113

General characteristics

- Crew: 1 pilot
- Capacity: one instructor
- Length: 21 ft 9 in (6.63 m)
- Wingspan: 27 ft (8.2 m)
- Height: 6 ft (1.8 m)
- Wing area: 126.6 sq ft (11.76 m^{2})
- Empty weight: 650 lb (295 kg)
- Gross weight: 1,200 lb (544 kg)
- Powerplant: 1 × Continental four-cylinder, horizontally-opposed, air-cooled piston engine, 65 hp (48 kW)

Performance

- Maximum speed: 115 mph (185 km/h, 100 kn)
- Cruise speed: 100 mph (160 km/h, 87 kn)
- Range: 350 mi (560 km, 300 nmi)
- Service ceiling: 12,000 ft (3,700 m)
- Rate of climb: 600 ft/min (3.0 m/s)

== Notes ==
=== Bibliography ===
- "Follow the Swallow". Private Pilot. Covina, California: Gallant. 1967. pp. 76–81.
- Mingos, Howard (1941). The Aircraft Year Book for 1941. New York: Aeronautical Chamber of Commerce of America.
- Mingos, Howard (1942). The Aircraft Year Book for 1942. New York: Aeronautical Chamber of Commerce of America.
- "Non-Certificated Aircraft". Western Flying. Vol. 19, no. 4. Los Angeles: Occidental Publishing. April 1939. pp. 70–89.
- Whittier, Bob (May 1962). "Harold Dale's... 1938 Air-Dale". Sport Aviation. Vol. 11, no. 5. Hales Corners, Wisconsin: Experimental Aircraft Association. p. 16.
- Swallow Airplane Company (October 1940). "There's Something New in the Air [Advertisement]". Aero Digest. Vol. 37, no. 4. New York: Aeronautical Digest Publishing. p. 142.
- "Swallow Low-Wing Trainer". Aero Digest. Vol. 37, no. 4. New York: Aeronautical Digest Publishing. October 1940. p. 113.
- Taylor, Michael J. H. (1993). Jane's Encyclopedia of Aviation. London: Studio Editions.
