= Swift Aircraft Swift =

Proposed light aircraft

Swift
- Artist's conception

General information
- Type: Aerobatic two seat light aircraft
- National origin: United Kingdom
- Manufacturer: Swift Aircraft

History
- First flight: Expected late 2023

The Swift Aircraft Swift is a single engine, conventional light aircraft, seating two in side-by-side configuration. It is being developed in the UK but has yet to fly.

== Design and development ==
The Swift is mostly built from composite materials; flying surfaces and the fuselage are formed from composite sandwiches and the wing and tailplane have carbon fibre spars. It has a low wing of trapezoidal plan with slightly upturned tips, fitted with Frise ailerons and slotted flaps. The rear surfaces are also trapezoidal. There is a trim tab in the elevator and a ground adjustable tab on the rudder.

The cockpit has a fixed windscreen and rearward-sliding canopy and is equipped with dual controls. There is a baggage space behind the side-by-side seats. The Swift has a fixed, tricycle undercarriage with the mainwheels on fuselage mounted, spring steel, cantilever legs. The mainwheels have disc brakes and the nosewheel is steerable. The Swift is designed to accept a range of Textron Lycoming horizontally opposed engines in the power range 119–194 kW (160–260 hp), driving a three-bladed propeller.

The Swift program was announced in May 2009. In 2015 Swift Technology Group announced a "multi million pound investment" supporting development of the aircraft and other products, and exhibited a static display at AeroExpo UK.

In 2021, the Royal Air Force announced its intention to become carbon neutral, called Project MONET. To further this project, the UK MOD awarded a contract in 2023 to develop the Swift as a zero-emission aircraft with a possible implementation date of 2027. Swift Technology Group have begun experimenting with hemp and flax fibres in the composite panels, as well as alternate fuels, and even electric propulsion.

== Variants ==
Swift II
Intended to be type certified to EASA CS-23
Swift M260
Military version of above, which may replace the Grob Tutor T1 in No. 6 Flying Training School RAF
Swift LSA
Intended to be certified to EASA CS-LSA
Swift VLA
Intended to be certified to EASA CS-VLA in kit and factory-complete flyaway versions

== Specifications (Swift II) ==
Data from Jane's All the World's Aircraft 2011/12 Performance estimated.

General characteristics

- Capacity: 2
- Length: 6.565 m (21 ft 6 in)
- Wingspan: 8.055 m (26 ft 5 in) including winglets
- Height: 2.015 m (6 ft 7 in)
- Empty weight: 372 kg (820 lb)
- Max takeoff weight: 743 kg (1,638 lb)
- Fuel capacity: 187 L (49.4 US gal; 41.1 Imp gal)
- Powerplant: 1 × Textron Lycoming air-cooled flat-six engine, 194 kW (260 hp)
- Propellers: 3-bladed MT-Propeller, constant speed

Performance

- Maximum speed: 340 km/h (210 mph, 180 kn)
- Cruise speed: 302 km/h (188 mph, 163 kn) at 75% power
- Stall speed: 93 km/h (58 mph, 50 kn) flaps down
- g limits: +6/-4
- Rate of climb: 10.7 m/s (2,110 ft/min) maximum, at sea level

Avionics

- EFIS.
- Bendix/King IFR.
