= Swen Swanson =

Swedish designer of early airplanes

- Born: 1897/98; Sweden
- Died: February 1935
- Known for: Aircraft design and manufacture

Swen (Sven) Swanson (1897/98 – February 1935) was a Swedish aircraft designer. He designed aircraft for various aviation companies in the United States and also designed prototype and experimental airplanes. He was known as an innovative aircraft designer. He later worked in partnership with Ole Fahlin. Swanson started designing airplanes while in his teens and by the time he was in college he had designed his third airplane. He founded the Swanson Aircraft Company Inc. and became its chief engineer and president. While working for his own company he designed and built the Swanson W-15 Coupe. He has been described as a "brilliant man of great capabilities and extreme modesty".

== Career ==
Swanson designed and constructed his first home-built airplane in 1915 when he was 17 years old which was a one-person monoplane which could have been retroactively named the SS1. At age 19 he designed and built his second airplane, a one-person biplane, which could have been retroactively called the SS2. In 1922, while a college student, he designed his third aircraft, the biplane SS3, standing for "Swanson Sport", featuring a fuselage made of wood and monocoque design and using a two-cylinder Lawrance engine. He also designed the Kari-Keen 90 Sioux Coupe and the Arrow Sport. These airplanes featured the characteristic Swanson cantilever wing design. The Swanson planes also shared a similar seating configuration; the two-passengers were seated beside each other.

=== Lincoln-Standard Airplane Co. ===
In 1923, Swanson had already graduated from the Aeronautical Engineering School at Vermillion, South Dakota and joined the Lincoln-Standard Airplane Co. previously known as the Nebraska Aircraft Company. He worked there as chief engineer replacing their previous chief engineer, Timm. Swanson in his new role at Lincoln-Standard designed a completely new aircraft. In addition, in consultation with Harold K. Phillips, superintendent of maintenance at the company, he designed a new small airplane, the Lincoln Sport, which was a single seater and was based on his earlier design the Swanson Sport.

=== Arrow Aircraft Co. ===
In 1925 Swanson left Lincoln-Standard and was hired at Arrow Aircraft Company in Havelock, Nebraska. At Arrow he designed a five-passenger plane, the Arrow 5. He also designed the Arrow Sport A2-60 which was built in 1926. In February 1929 the plane was certified as A2-60 and its price was set in the range of $2,900-3,485. The structural integrity of the airplane frame was very good and the fact that the pilot and passenger were seated beside each other, the view from the cockpit and the fact that it had controls for both passengers made the plane popular, as a trainer, among pilots. It also featured the trademark cantilever wings of Swanson's design. By 1931, approximately 100 planes had been built, but due to the Great Depression the market for recreational airplanes collapsed and the manufacturer went into receivership in 1940.

=== Kari-Keen ===
Swanson's design of the Kari-Keen Coupe monoplane incorporated his trademark seating of two people alongside each other and was an unusual design at the time. Following the first version of the Kari-Keen Coupe, Swanson designed the Kari-Keen 90, an improved version. But the Kari-Keen factory fell victim to the Great Depression and by early 1930 it closed its doors. Swanson did not wait for long and left Kari-Keen to devote his time to the design of his Swanson Coupe W15, which has been described as "beautiful".

=== Swanson Aircraft Co. ===
In 1931, after he left Kari-Keen, Swanson established the Swanson Aircraft Co. Inc. with headquarters at Hopewell, Virginia, and built the Swanson Coupe W15 whose design incorporated new breakthroughs such as a new type of patented wing structure which enabled unobstructed views from the cockpit for both pilot and passenger even from above their heads. This was done by eliminating an extra wing span which was used to obstruct the ceiling of the cockpit and limit overhead vision. Swanson did not have any commercial success with his Swanson Coupe. He subsequently decided to dissolve his aircraft company and go to the midwest to join the aircraft company of his friend Ole Fahlin. The Swanson Coupe became the basis of the first airplane produced jointly by them, the Fahlin SF-1, which in turn was the precursor of the Swanson-Fahlin SF-2 Plymocoupe.

=== Fahlin Aircraft Co. ===
==== SF-1 ====
Swen Swanson designed and built along with Fahlin the first airplane of their partnership, the SF-1, which stood for Swanson-Fahlin Model 1. The design and performance of the SF-1 was very successful. The plane was built in the facilities of the Nicholas-Beazley Airplane Company, which had provided working space for Fahlin at their Marshall, Missouri plant. A reviewer, writing for the Western Aviation magazine, praised the performance of the Swanson-Fahlin SF-1 writing in 1934: "Having ridden in the new ship built by Swanson & Fahlin, I wish to say that it is the nicest little ship I have ever flown". The SF-1 was one of the earliest examples of an American airplane designed specifically to accommodate the Pobjoy engine.

==== Plymocoupe ====
In 1935, following a competition called by the Bureau of Air Commerce, seeking design and construction proposals for an airplane affordable by the masses, Swanson designed the aircraft, and Fahlin designed the propeller and produced the Fahlin SF-2 Plymocoupe which utilised the engine of a 1935 Plymouth which also featured design accents, both interior and exterior, borrowed from the same car. After flight testing by the Bureau, the Swanson-Fahlin plane design did not win the competition. The Plymocoupe was classified as a "flying automobile" because it utilised the engine of the 1935 Plymouth car. The Plymocoupe design also used many components borrowed from the car including the dashboard and the indicators.

== Death ==
Swanson died in February 1935 of pneumonia while still building the Swanson-Fahlin SF-2 Plymocoupe. After his death, the airplane was named the Fahlin SF-2 Plymocoupe.

== Literature ==
Swanson is mentioned in Jerry Sloniger's 2005 book 1924: Flying Capone's Booze, where he appears as the chief engineer of the Lincoln-Standard Airplane Company.

== Swanson designs ==
- Swanson 1917 Monoplane (possibly retroactively SS-1)
- Swanson 1919 Biplane (possibly retroactively SS-2)
- Swanson SS-3
- Swanson SS-4
- Swanson W-15 Coupe
- Swanson-Fahlin SF-1
- Swanson-Fahlin SF-2 Plymocoupe (aka Fahlin Plymocoupe after Swanson's death)
- Swanson-Freeman SF-4
