= Swallow Airplane Company =

American airplane manufacturer

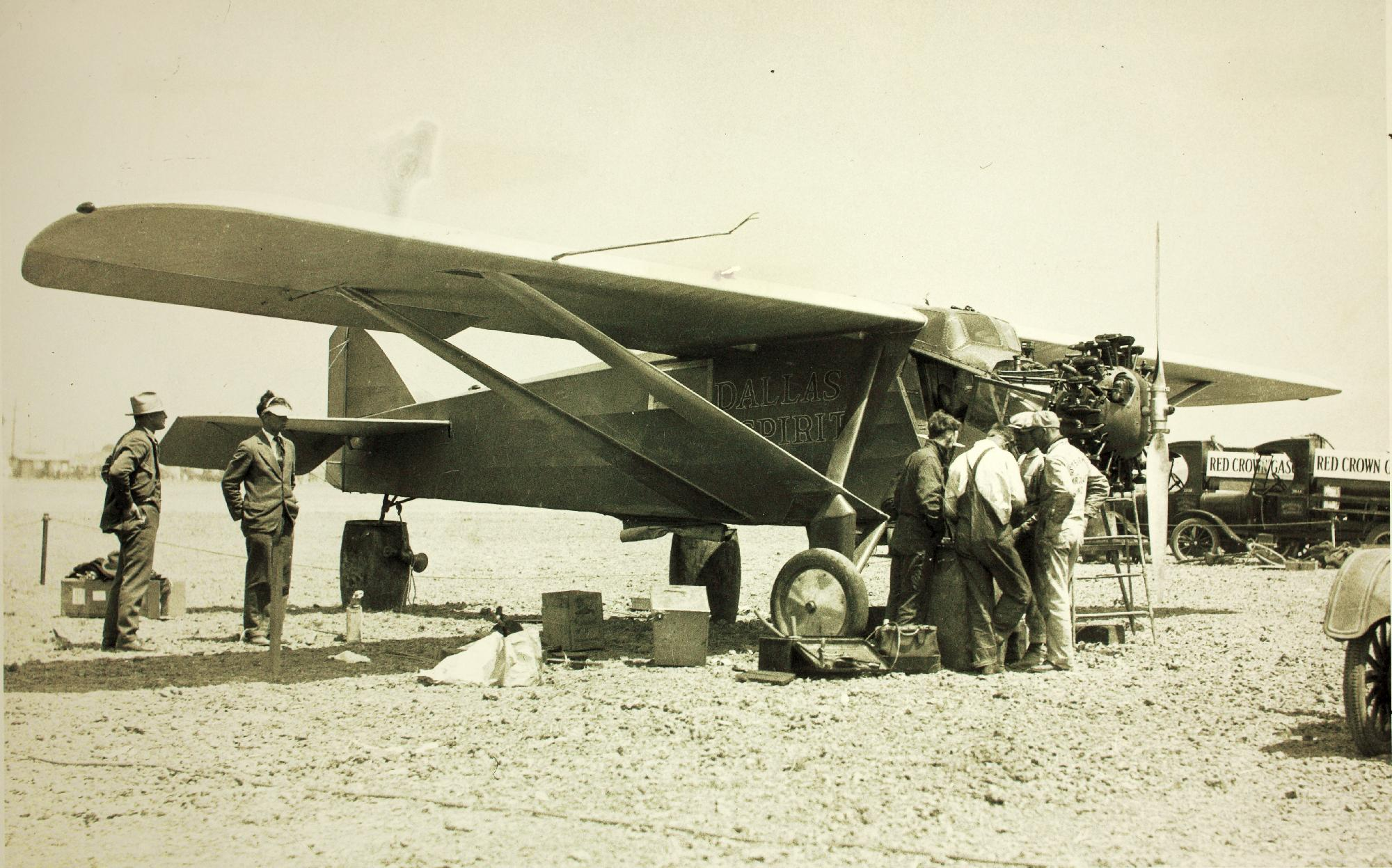
- Formerly: E.M. Laird Aviation Company
- Industry: Aerospace
- Predecessor: Wichita Airplane Company
- Founded: 1920
- Founders: William A. Burke; Emil Matthew Laird; Jacob Mollendick
- Defunct: 1956
- Headquarters: Wichita, Kansas, United States
- Parent: General Aero Corporation of America (1928-1933)

The Swallow Airplane Company was an early manufacturer of airplanes.

== History ==
In January 1920, the E.M. Laird Aviation Company Ltd. was started with the purchase of the six-month-old Wichita Aircraft Company, its aircraft and the factory of the Watkins Manufacturing Company. Oilman Jacob Mollendick and Buick-Franklin salesman William A. Burke each contributed $15,000. The first Swallow designed by Buck Weaver and was test flown in April 1920. Later, in 1921, the company moved into a new factory building on North Hillside Street. Laird hired several aviators that became prominent in the business later, Buck Weaver who would co-found Waco Aircraft, Walter Beech, and Lloyd Stearman who would develop the Swallow New Swallow. Following the departure of Emil Matthew Laird in 1923 and his formation of the E. M. Laird Airplane Company, on 22 January 1924 the company was renamed as the Swallow Airplane Manufacturing Company.

Swallow was notable for producing the Swallow TP in quite large numbers, for its day. A large proportion of pilots trained in the late 1920s and early '30s did so on the TP. In late 1927, owner Mollendick bet most of the company fortune on a record setting aircraft flown by noted aviator William Portwood Erwin, the Dallas Spirit, which was lost on a record attempt to Asia concurrent with the Dole Air Race. In December of the following year the company was purchased by the General Aero Corporation of America – a holding company that also counted the Cessna Aircraft Company among its assets. Swallow was sold again in 1933 to E. B. Christopher – who would be killed in the crash of one of the company's airplanes in 1937. Sam Bloomfield, the company's chief engineer, eventually took over as company president. No longer manufacturing complete aircraft, it existed as an aircraft mechanic school and subcontractor for the B-29 and B-47 until 1956.

== Aircraft ==
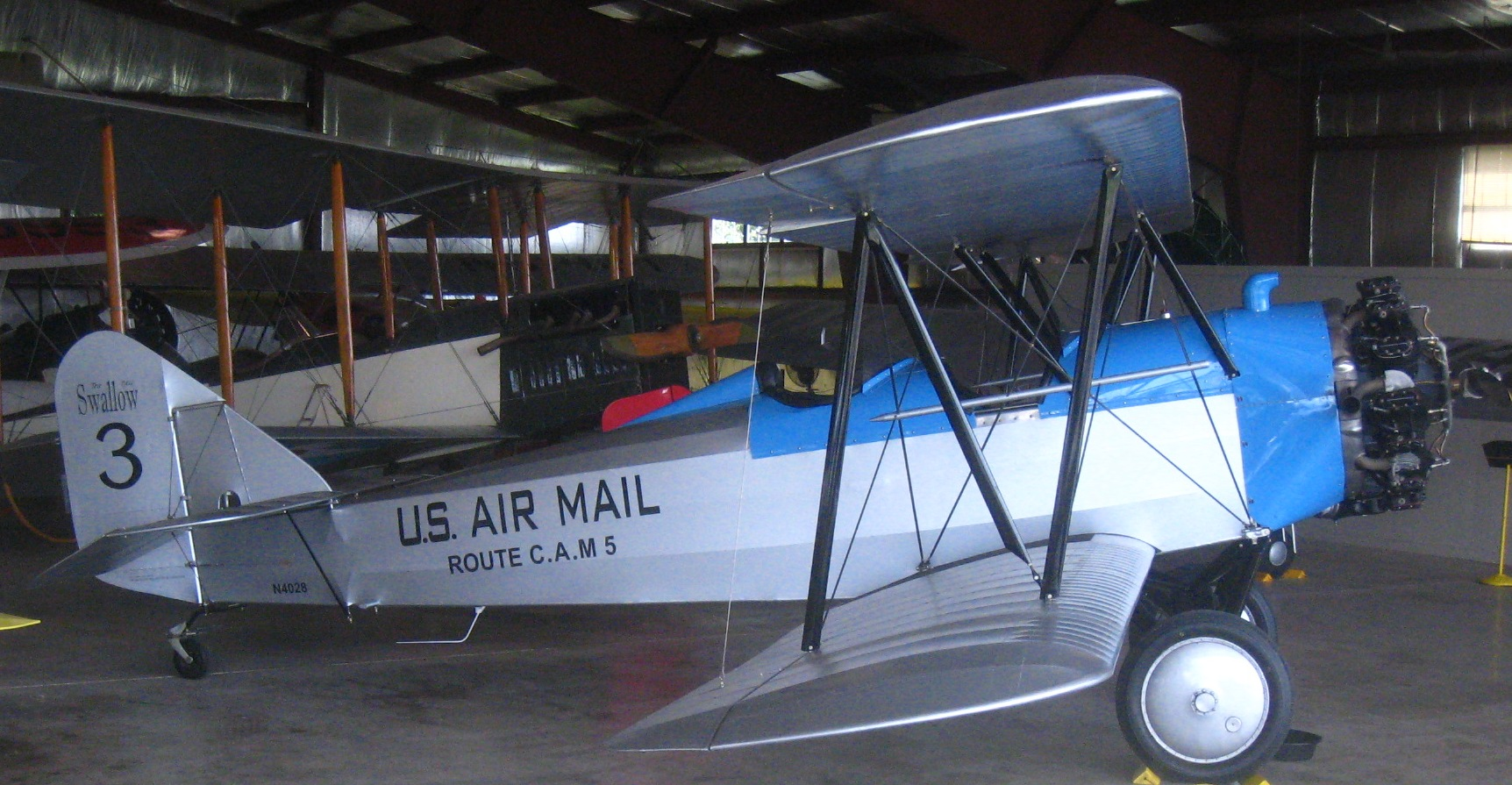
Swallow OX-5

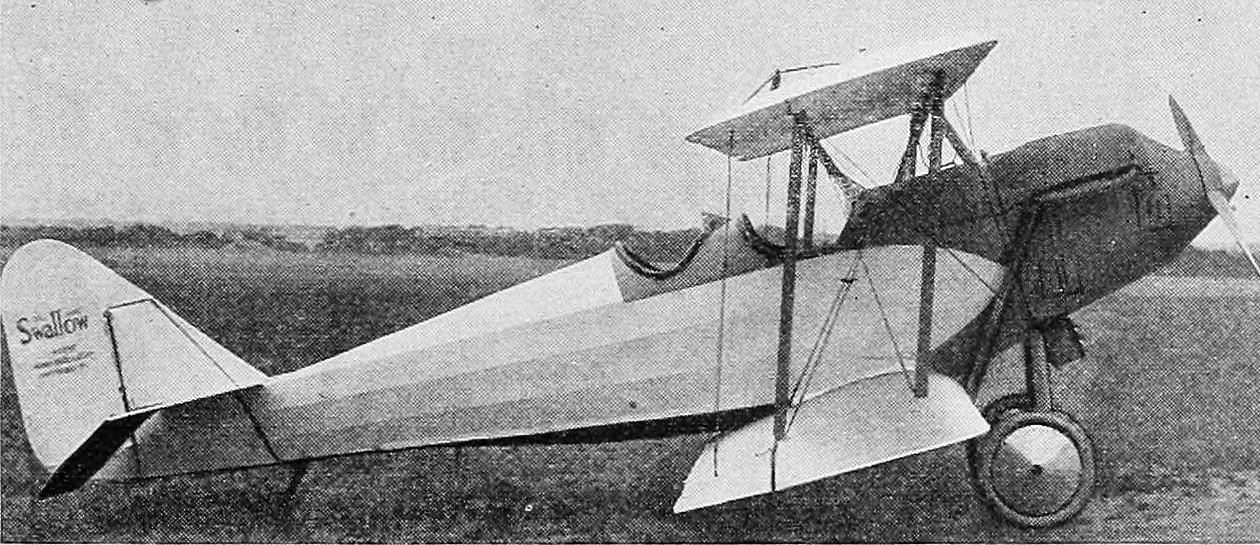
Swallow Super Swallow photo from Aero Digest July 1926

Model name	First flight	Number built	Type
Swallow HA		1	Single engine open cockpit biplane
Swallow Racer			Single engine open cockpit biplane
Swallow New Swallow		~50	Single engine open cockpit biplane
Swallow J4 Swallow			Single engine open cockpit biplane
Swallow Mailplane			Single engine open cockpit biplane
Swallow Super Swallow		~50	Single engine open cockpit biplane
Swallow OX-5 Swallow		~250	Single engine open cockpit biplane
Swallow Monoplane		1	Single engine cabin monoplane
Swallow Hisso Swallow		~6	Single engine open cockpit biplane
Swallow J5 Swallow			Single engine open cockpit biplane
Swallow G-29		2	Single engine open cockpit biplane
Swallow T-29		1	Single engine open cockpit biplane
Swallow H		1	Single engine open cockpit biplane
Swallow HC Sport		1	Single engine open cockpit biplane
Swallow TP		~200	Single engine open cockpit biplane
Swallow C-165		1	Single engine cabin monoplane
Swallow F-28-AX		5	Single engine open cockpit biplane
Swallow HW Sport		1	Single engine open cockpit biplane
Swallow C Coupe		3	Single engine cabin monoplane
Swallow LT65		1	Single engine cabin monoplane
