= Swift Aircraft =

British aerospace corporation

Coordinates: 52°45′27″N 01°21′00″E

Swift Aircraft Limited
- Company type: Private limited company
- Industry: Aerospace
- Founded: 2004; 22 years ago
- Headquarters: Scottow Enterprise Park, RAF Coltishall, Norfolk, England
- Key people: David Stanbridge (founder and managing director)
- Products: Certified aircraft, kitplanes
- Parent: Swift Technology Group
- Website: SwiftAircraft.com

Swift Aircraft Limited is a British aerospace manufacturer that designs the Swift II aerobatic training aircraft.

== Swift II ==
The Swift II is a side-by-side, two-seat training and aerobatic aircraft, and is currently in the final stages of design. Swift Aircraft plan to market the Swift II for the military and civilian markets when it becomes available. The aircraft will be of all composite construction to save weight and improve performance. The company expected to commence tooling for construction of the Swift II by the end of 2011, and will initially offer the Swift II as a kit, before bringing the design up to certified standard. The Swift range is planned to include:

- Swift II (certified CS-23)
- Swift VLA (certified CS-VLA)
- Swift VLA (kit plane)

== Other activities ==
In 2008, Swift took over fellow British composite aircraft manufacturer, Europa Aircraft.

The company also sells and leases the Slingsby T67 Firefly, having purchased 22 examples from Babcock Defence Services in June 2011 following their retirement from the British military elementary flying training programme. It is responsible for support and service of the Firefly, although it does not possess the type certificate, as this was revoked by its former holder, Marshall Group.

In June 2019, permission was granted from local councils to reopen the runway at the former RAF Coltishall (where Swift Aircraft are now located), and allow Swift Aircraft to produce 98 aircraft a year as well as allowing eight flights a day from the former airbase.

== Current Status ==
It is unknown of the status of the Swift II. The company stated in 2023 that the first prototype would be flown in 2024, however this has been pushed back to 2025.
