= Swallow Super Swallow =

American-built general purpose biplane of the mid- to late 1920s

Super Swallow
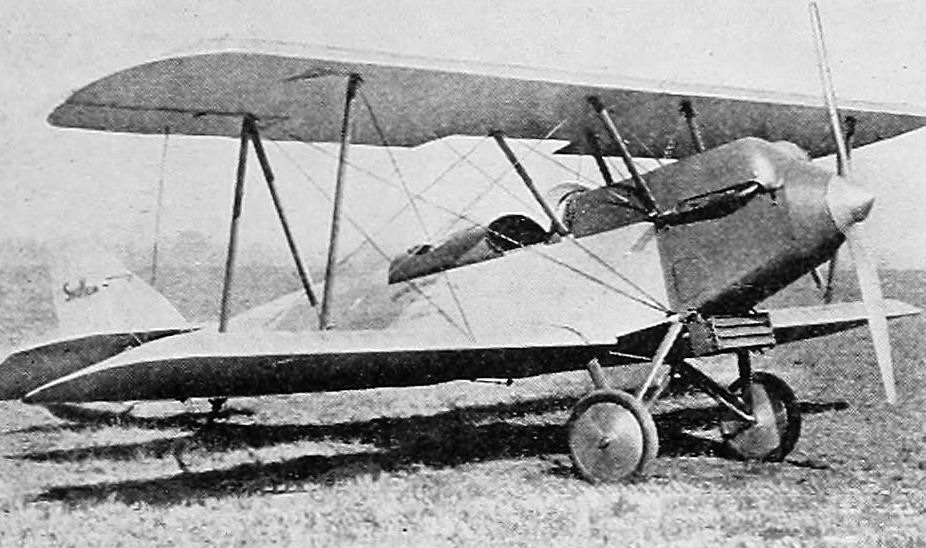

General information
- Type: General purpose biplane
- National origin: United States
- Manufacturer: Swallow Airplane Manufacturing Co.
- Designer: Waverly Stearman
- Number built: >100

History
- Manufactured: 1927–29
- Introduction date: c.1926
- First flight: c.1926
- Developed from: Swallow New Swallow

The Swallow Super Swallow is an American-built general purpose biplane of the late 1920s, developed from the Swallow New Swallow. Versions powered by the 90-hp (66-kW) Curtiss OX-5 engine and the 220-hp (162-kW) Wright J-5 engine are also known as the Swallow 90 and Swallow 220 or as the OX-5 Swallow and J5 Swallow. (Note: The designation OX-5 Swallow is sometimes used interchangeably to refer to OX-5-powered New Swallow aircraft; sometimes even within the same reference.)

== Design and development ==
The Swallow Airplane Manufacturing Co successfully marketed a derivative of the Laird Swallow as the New Swallow in 1924. Already by this time, it was apparent to aircraft designers that steel airframes offered advantages over the traditional wooden airframes as used in the New Swallow. Swallow designers Lloyd Stearman and Walter Beech approached company founder Jacob Moellendick with a plan to redesign the Swallow with a steel structure. Favoring a more conservative approach, Moellendick rejected their suggestion, and Stearman and Beech quit Swallow to found their own company, Travel Air, with Clyde Cessna.

By 1926, however, Moellendick relented, and company manager Charles Laird and designer Waverly Stearman (brothers of E. M. Laird and Lloyd Stearman) presented him with a design for a modernized Swallow. Keeping the original Swallow layout, the Super Swallow fuselage and tail were built on a frame of welded chrome-moly steel tubes, while keeping a wooden structure for the wings. The wooden, parallel interplane and cabane struts were changed to steel "N" configuration. Attention was given to streamlining throughout the design, including the engine cowl, struts, and bracing wires. The wing profile was changed from the Clark Y to the higher-camber USA 27.

The OX-5-powered Super Swallow was issued Approved Type Certificate (ATC) 21 by the Aeronautics Branch of the Department of Commerce in December 1927. Hispano-Suiza 8-powered, J-5-powered and Axelson-powered versions were certificated under ATC 50, ATC 51, and ATC 125 respectively.

Production continued until 1929.

== Operational history ==
Like other general-purpose aircraft, Super Swallows were used for recreational flying, short-range passenger flights, and pilot training. One notable Super Swallow owner was rodeo and movie star Hoot Gibson who owned a J5 Swallow.

In the early 21st century, at least two Super Swallows were still flying: serial number 842, registration NC979, and serial number 899, registration N4028. NC979 has been restored to close to original configuration and specifications. N4028 has been extensively modified, including the installation of a Continental R-670 engine in place of its original OX-5. This latter aircraft forms part of the collection of the Experimental Aircraft Association at Pioneer Airport, where it is used to offer joyrides to the public. As of 2024, its owners suggested that it might be the oldest aircraft available to hire this way anywhere in the world.

Other preserved Super Swallows include:

- OX-5 Swallow registration C6191 at the Kansas Aviation Museum
- OX-5 Swallow serial number 968, registration N6070 at the Museum of Flight (modified to replace its engine with a Continental R-670, and painted to represent a New Swallow mailplane operated by Varney Air Lines
- OX-5 Swallow serial number 1012, registration NC7797 at the Western Antique Aeroplane & Automobile Museum

== Variants ==
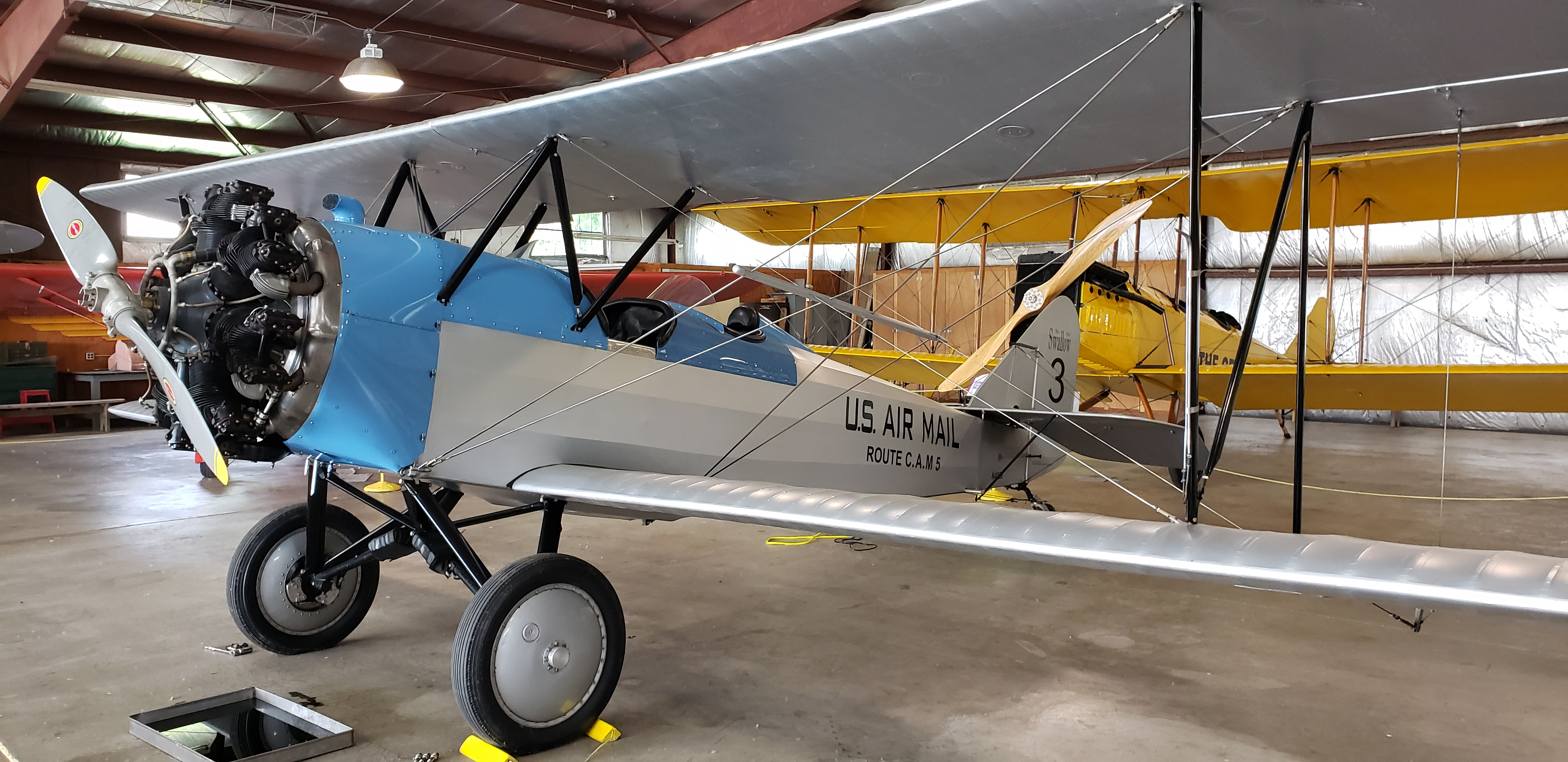
Super Swallow with J-5 engine

Super Swallow
also known as OX-5 Swallow and Swallow 90; original production version with Curtiss OX-5 engine. ATC 21
Hisso Swallow
Super Swallow fitted with Hispano-Suiza 8A or 8E engine. ATC 50
J5 Swallow
also known as Swallow 220; Super Swallow fitted with Wright J-5 radial engine. ATC 51
Swallow F28-AX
also known as Swallow Special; Super Swallow fitted with Axelson radial engine. Only one known to be built (Canadian registration CF-AUL). ATC 125

== Specifications (J5 Swallow) ==
Data from Juptner 1962a, p.134

General characteristics

- Crew: 1
- Capacity: 3 passengers
- Length: 23 ft 6 in (7.16 m)
- Wingspan: 32 ft 8 in (9.96 m)
- Height: 9 ft (2.7 m)
- Wing area: 300 sq ft (28 m^{2})
- Airfoil: USA 27
- Empty weight: 1,716 lb (778 kg)
- Gross weight: 2,700 lb (1,225 kg)
- Useful lift: 753 lb (342 kg)
- Powerplant: 1 × Wright J-5 9-cylinder, air-cooled radial piston, 220 hp (160 kW)

Performance

- Maximum speed: 128 mph (206 km/h, 111 kn)
- Cruise speed: 109 mph (175 km/h, 95 kn)
- Range: 550 mi (890 km, 480 nmi)
- Service ceiling: 18,000 ft (5,500 m)
- Rate of climb: 1,000 ft/min (5.1 m/s)
