= Fahlin SF-2 Plymocoupe =

SF-2 Plymocoupe
- Fahlin SF-2 Plymocoupe

General information
- Type: Light aircraft
- Manufacturer: Fahlin Aircraft Company
- Designer: Swen Swanson, Ole Fahlin
- Status: Single prototype destroyed in hangar fire in 1938
- Primary users: Fahlin Aircraft Company Russel Owen
- Number built: 1

History
- Introduction date: 1935
- First flight: 1935

The Fahlin SF-2 Plymocoupe was a high-wing, cantilever type, prototype experimental airplane produced in 1935.

== Design and development ==
The SF-2, designed in response to a competition called by the United States Bureau of Air Commerce seeking design and construction proposals for an airplane affordable to the masses, was designed and built by Ole Fahlin and his partner Swen Swanson using the engine of a 1935 Plymouth automobile and featuring design accents, both interior and exterior, borrowed from the same car.

The Plymocoupe, classified as a "flying automobile", utilised the engine, dashboard, indicators and hood ornament of the 1935 Plymouth car.

== History ==
The instrument panel of the SF-2 emulated the look of the Plymouth automobile dashboard.

Based on the Swanson-Fahlin SF-1, Fahlin used a regular six-cylinder in-line Chrysler car engine, adapted to aircraft use, to power the airplane, supported by rubber suspension. The SF-2 was flight tested by the Bureau of Commerce, but failed to meet the specifications of the contest contract.

=== Engine conversion ===
The engine of the SF-2 Plymocoupe

The stock Chrysler engine was modified for aeronautics use by removing the flywheel and cooling fan. The automotive electrical ignition system was replaced by an air plane magneto and a new lighter exhaust system was installed. The standard carburetor was replaced by the updraught type where the air entered from below and exited at the top of the unit. The cylinder heads were replaced by new ones made from aluminium which had the effect of decreasing the weight of the engine while increasing the compression ratio from 6.7:1 to 7:1. The reduction gearbox was mounted on the engine housing directly connected to the crankshaft, lubricated by the engine oil system.

Plymocoupe engine in US Government laboratories tested by experts of the Bureau of Air Commerce. The silver housing mounted to the right of the engine block is the gear reduction unit.

The propeller was driven via the gearbox using a 2:1 gear-reduction ratio, which enabled the engine to operate at full power driving the propeller at its optimum speed of 1800 rpm. The propeller shaft passed through the radiator, which was mounted in front of the engine.

Most engine parts remained stock and could be obtained at any of the approximately 8,000 Chrysler, De Soto or Dodge dealers in the United States, while any engine repairs and maintenance could be performed by any Chrysler-trained mechanic. Among design accents reminiscent of automotive design, the aircraft cowling featured portholes similar to the ones found in the original 1935 Plymouth car. Other features included mohair interior, adjustable windows and a cowling ornament in the form of a ship, similar to the hood ornament of the car. Flying magazine praised Fahlin's engine conversion to aircraft use as "one of the smoothest jobs of adapting an automobile motor to aircraft use".

=== Engine certification ===
The left side of the engine

The SF-2 engine was required to pass two series of tests before being granted the ATC (Approved Type Certificate) which would allow it to be used in aircraft flight applications. The regulations required a government-run 50-hour test on the Chrysler engine and an additional 100-hour test undertaken by the manufacturer itself. Chrysler was willing at the time to participate in the process because it forecast increased demand for aviation-related applications of its automobile engines. The engine passed all necessary tests. At the same time the Bureau of Air Commerce asked Fahlin Aircraft Company in Marshall, MO to manufacture an airplane which would be used to test the certified engine in flight.

=== Airframe ===
==== Wings ====
1935 Plymouth and Fahlin SF-2 Plymocoupe

An innovative feature of the wing arrangement was that the flaps could also be used as ailerons in a configuration akin to a flaperon. The flap area was one third of the total wing area and the flaps extended along the entire length of the wing. A lever controlled the flap action and through a different configuration it could change to aileron control mode.

==== Landing gear ====
The landing gear provided knee-action struts for absorbing the shock during landing.

== Operational history ==
=== Flight tests ===
Fahlin SF-2 Plymocoupe

During flight tests the Plymocoupe achieved a maximum speed of 120 mph (190 km/h; 100 kn) and cruising speed of 100 mph (160 km/h; 87 kn). On a trip between two cities in the midwest of the United States it took the airplane two and a half hours to cover a distance of 250 mi (400 km; 220 nmi). The engine used standard gasoline and its fuel consumption was 25 mpg_{‑US} (9.4 L/100 km; 30 mpg_{‑imp}), while its oil consumption for the trip was approximately a quart. Its performance was superior to the similarly powered Porterfield 35, in all aspects except during takeoff.

=== Attempted non-stop flight ===
Plymocoupe after the crash-landing

The aircraft was tested and certified as airworthy and Fahlin was commissioned by Chrysler to bring it to Detroit for additional tests. However the failure of the SF-2 to win the competition and the death of Fahlin's partner Swanson, from pneumonia, led to the sale of the aircraft to Russel Owen, who was planning a non-stop flight from Anchorage to Seattle. The aircraft was subsequently renamed Sea-Aska and modified by increasing its fuel capacity.

At the time, the Anchorage Daily Times had written that the flight would set a record for "the longest flight ever made with an automobile engine." The aircraft had the name Se As Ka at the pilot door followed by the description "The Flying Automobile", while the side of the fuselage was inscribed by the message "Seattle-Alaska Last Airmail Frontier Trail Blazed by The Seattle Washingtonians".

However while flying over Juneau in fog, on 28 September 1936, Owen thought that he had oil-pressure problems and crash-landed near the unlit Juneau airport at night. In September 1936, following the crash-landing, Owen sent a telegram to his sponsors writing: "Sea-Aska on her asska in Alaska." The landing gear of the airplane failed and there was damage to the cowling and the propeller. The aircraft remained un-repaired in Shell Simmons' hangar at Juneau airport until 1938 when it burned during a hangar fire, started accidentally by technicians working in the hangar.

== Specifications (SF-2) ==
Dynamometer tests of the Plymocoupe engine at the U.S. government laboratories. The silver-colored housing of the gear reduction unit is attached to the right of the engine block.

Data from

General characteristics

- Crew: one
- Capacity: one passenger or 536 lb (243 kg) useful load
- Length: 17 ft 8 in (5.38 m)
- Wingspan: 32 ft (9.8 m)
- Wing area: 178 sq ft (16.5 m^{2})
- Empty weight: 1,075 lb (488 kg)
- Gross weight: 1,611 lb (731 kg)
- Fuel capacity: 17 US gal (64 L; 14 imp gal)
- Powerplant: 1 × Plymouth 6-cyl water-cooled in-line piston engine, 80 hp (60 kW) with 2:1 reduction gearing

Performance

- Maximum speed: 120 mph (190 km/h, 100 kn)
- Cruise speed: 104 mph (167 km/h, 90 kn)
- Endurance: 5 hours
- Service ceiling: 16,000 ft (4,900 m)
- Rate of climb: 1,000 ft/min (5.1 m/s) solo
- Wing loading: 9.04 lb/sq ft (44.1 kg/m^{2})
- Power/mass: 0.0476 hp/lb (0.0782 kW/kg)
