= Ole Fahlin =

Swedish aviator (1901–1992)

- Born: Olof Fahlin; May 8, 1901; Sweden
- Died: January 26, 1992 (aged 90)
- Known for: Propeller design and manufacturing, design and production of experimental airplanes

Ole (Olof) Fahlin (May 8, 1901 – January 26, 1992) was a Swedish aviator who made his career manufacturing propellers and aviation products in the United States. He also developed prototype airplanes and worked in projects with Chrysler and Lockheed Corporation. His propellers were famous for their performance. During World War II he manufactured propellers for the U.S. government.

== Life and career ==
Olof Fahlin was born in Järvsö, Hälsingland, Sweden on May 8, 1901, to Anders and Margret Fahlin (née Larsdotter). His father was an industrialist who was a farm equipment manufacturer (Threshing mill factory Manager). At 19 years of age, Fahlin followed his father to Germany after World War I during the time of the signing of the armistice. The purpose of the trip was to promote his father's farm equipment products. While in Berlin, Olof Fahlin visited the Johannisthal Air Field where he took flying lessons from Hans Riesler, an old army pilot. When he returned home Fahlin eventually flew for the Swedish Royal Air Service as a pilot. On 21 April 1921, he obtained his international pilot's license from Fédération Aéronautique Internationale. His international pilot license number was 208 and the information was translated in six languages.

=== United States ===
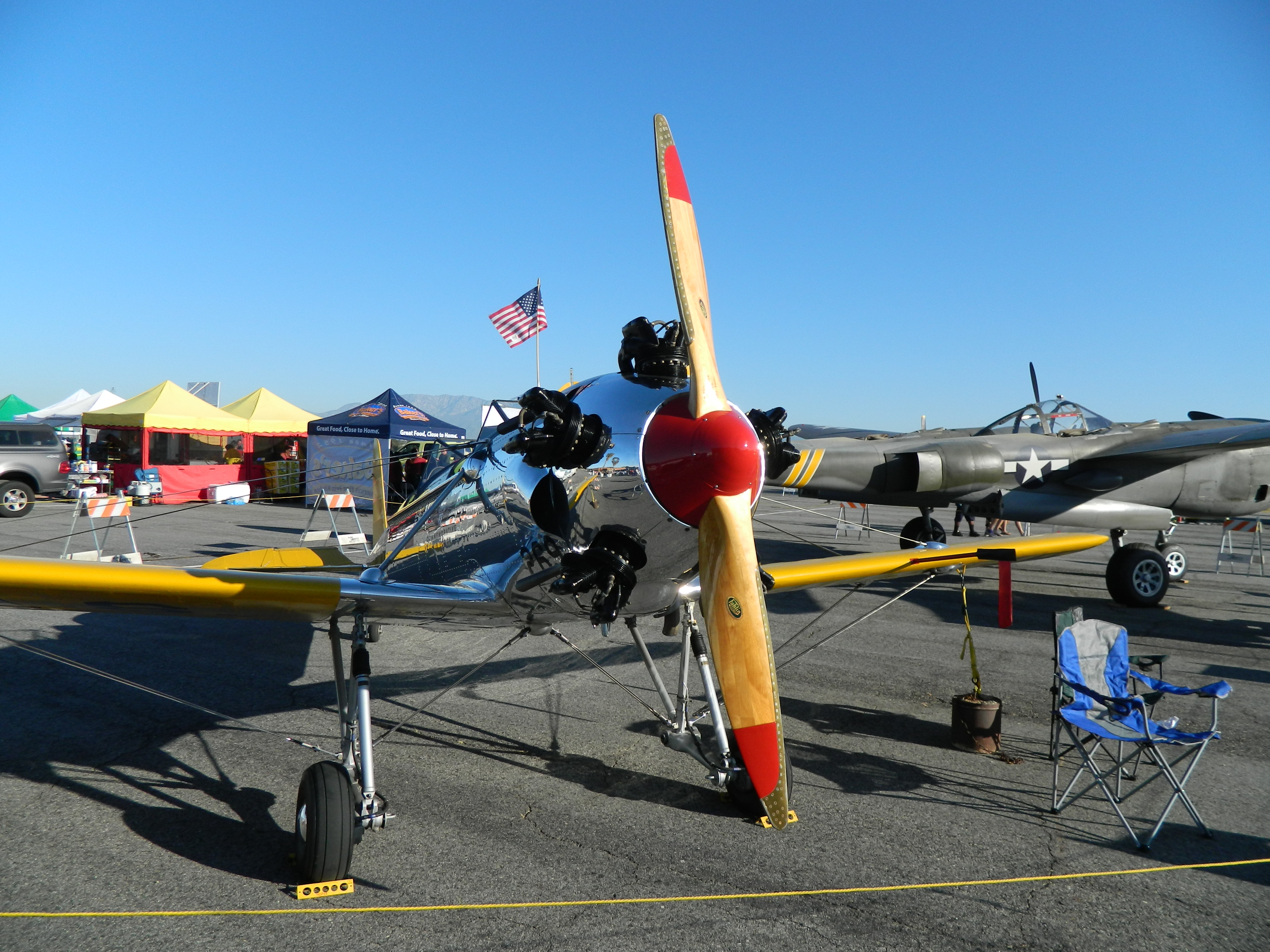
Fahlin Propeller on airplane at Riverside Municipal Airport (KRAL) air show on March 28, 2015.

In 1923 Fahlin decided to leave Sweden to go to the United States to visit a relative, and was naturalised in 1928. Soon after entering the U.S. he bought a used Curtiss JN-4 Jenny for $300 and started flying it for business and pleasure. He also used it to offer rides to people for $5 per trip. However he was not satisfied with the performance of his plane and started to experiment with different propeller designs which he thought could improve the performance characteristics of the Jenny.

He was so successful in that endeavor that he started getting customers for his propeller designs who could not understand how Fahlin was able to create propellers which performed substantially better than what they thought were state-of-the-art designs. Fahlin supplied propellers to private pilots and formula air racers. He would further manually optimize propellers for air racers in the field with the aid of a wood rasp which he used to remove material from the propeller. One of his customers was Rudy Kling, an airplane racer, whose Folkerts Special won the Thompson Trophy in Cleveland, Ohio, using one of Fahlin's propeller designs.

==== SF-1 ====
As Fahlin's fame increased, Russell B. Nicholas, co-owner of the Nicholas-Beazley Airplane Company, invited him to use his manufacturing facilities in Marshall, Missouri, for free. Fahlin accepted and together with Swen Swanson designed and built their first airplane, the SF-1, which stood for Swanson-Fahlin Model 1. The design and performance of the SF-1 was very successful.

==== Plymocoupe ====
In 1935, following a competition called by the Bureau of Air Commerce, seeking design and construction proposals for an airplane affordable by the masses, Fahlin in cooperation with Swanson designed and produced the Fahlin SF-2 Plymocoupe which utilised the engine of a 1935 Plymouth which also featured design accents, both interior and exterior, borrowed from the same car. After flight testing by the Bureau, the Fahlin plane design was rejected. The Plymocoupe was classified as a "flying automobile" because it utilised the engine of the 1935 Plymouth car. The Plymocoupe design also used many components borrowed from the car including the dashboard and the indicators.

==== Missouri to California ====
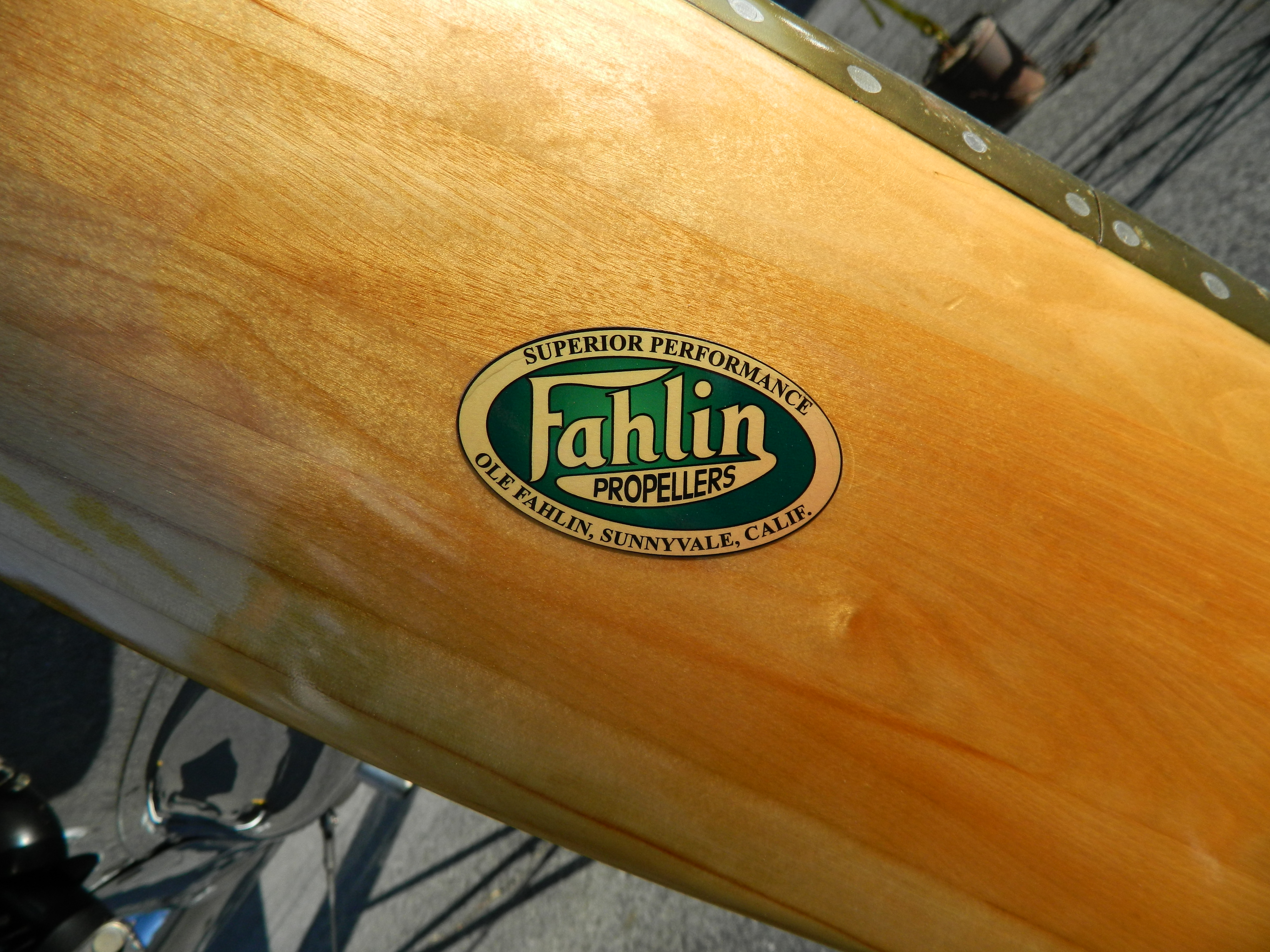
Fahlin Propeller showing location in "Sunnyvale, Calif."

After the dissolution of the Nicholas-Beazley Airplane Company, the Columbia Chamber of Commerce offered Fahlin factory space in Columbia, Missouri, and Fahlin started taking orders directly from the Federal government during World War II while Air Associates distributed his propellers nationwide. Fahlin eventually moved his operations to California in 1962. He was consultant to Lockheed and assisted during the development of the YO-3 quiet plane project, during which he provided in-flight analysis for the propellers developed and tested by Lockheed. His cooperation with Lockheed continued for several years after that project.

== Death ==
Ole Fahlin died on January 26, 1992, in a hospital at Gilroy, California, from pneumonia. On January 31, 1992, a memorial service was held at Morgan Hill, California, during which a "missing man flyby" was performed by 10 vintage airplanes flown by his friends.

== Memorial workshop ==
Fahlin's propeller workshop survives as a working exhibit at the Wings of History Air Museum in San Martin, California.
