= Breese-Wilde Model 5 =

Story of Breeze-Wilde 5 and its role in aviation history

Model 5
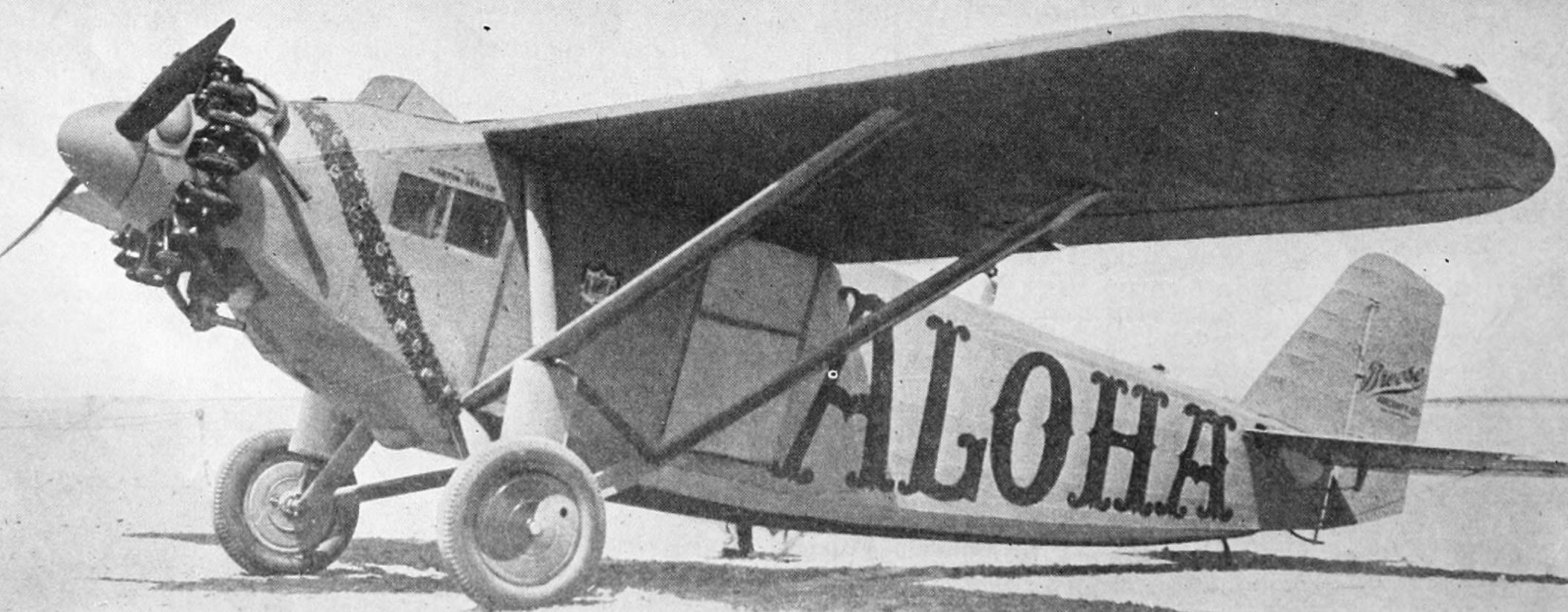

General information
- Type: Monoplane
- National origin: United States
- Manufacturer: Breese-Wilde Aircraft Company
- Designer: Vance Breese, Arthur F. Wilde

History
- First flight: 1927

The Breese-Wilde 5 is a custom-built high-wing monoplane that was produced for and used in the Dole Air Derby of 1927. In 1928, it became the sole example of an airplane being used as a portable radio broadcasting station.

== Design ==
The aircraft were conventional geared high-wing aircraft, powered with a Wright Whirlwind J-5 engine.

== Operational history ==
=== Serial Number 1 ===
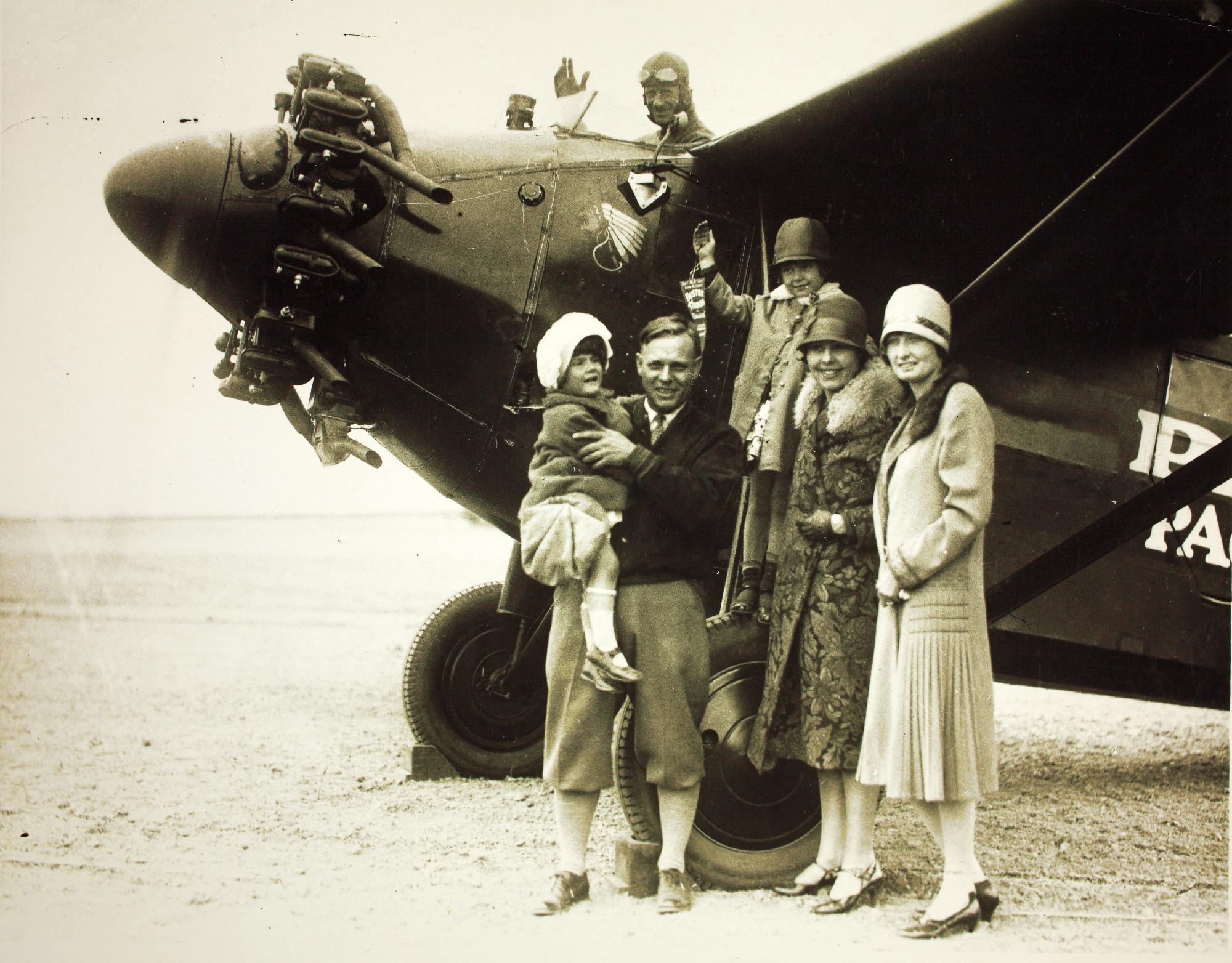
Pabco Pacific Flyer with Maj. Irving and family before the start of the Dole Air Race (1927)

In 1927, Inspired by Charles A. Lindbergh's successful trans-Atlantic flight, James D. Dole, the Hawaii pineapple magnate, put up a prize of $25,000 for the first fixed-wing aircraft to fly the 3,870 kilometers (2,400 mi) from Oakland, California to Honolulu, Hawaii, and $10,000 for second place. Oakland built a 7,020 foot-long runway, which was the longest in the world at the time, in just 21 days to meet the Dole race start. Livingston Gilson Irving, (1895 –1983) was a decorated American World War I pilot who served in the 103d Aero Squadron, 3d Pursuit Group, U.S. Army Air Service, A.E.F., near Bantheville, France. Irvine was the first contestant to enter the Dole Air Derby. The aircraft he chose to purchase for the attempt was the first Breese-Wilde monoplane. Irving's father, Samuel C. Irving, was mayor of Berkeley and owner of San Francisco-based Paraffine Companies Inc., where both worked. The company and its employees sponsored the aircraft for the attempt, naming it the Pabco Pacific Flyer and painted with the Indian head of his World War I unit. While most contestants had navigators, Irving was the only one qualified for both positions. While on the takeoff attempt for the Dole prize, Irving overran the runway. He was towed back, launched again, and crashed after stalling the heavily loaded, bright orange plane. The landing gear collapsed, which precluded him from racing.

Irving donated his radio to William Portwood Erwin, who was piloting the competing Dallas Spirit to look for downed racers. Erwin and his navigator, Alvin Eichwaldt, perished in the rescue attempt as well. Irving escaped uninjured, exiting the ill-fated air race that claimed ten others' lives.

In November 1927, the aircraft was wrecked in the Mojave desert, ripping off both wings; it was then sold to Irving for $10.00. It was rebuilt by the Breese Aircraft Company to a cabin style with a new fuselage, wing, wheels and a new propeller. Aircraft Industries Inc. then lengthened the aircraft 8 inches and added new wings five feet longer. The new plane was re-registered as the seven-place Irving Cabin Monoplane, which Irving named "Redwing",

This modification included using it as a commercial aerial broadcasting station. A radio license was issued to Flying Broadcasters (Inc.) in late 1927, initially with the sequentially assigned call letters of "KHAC", although a short time later the call letters were changed to "KFBI". In late March 1928 the station made its debut broadcast, transmitting on 1470 kHz on the AM band at 7,200 feet (2,200 meters) over Hayward. However, a few weeks later the Federal Radio Commission announced that, effective July 1, it would no longer license portable broadcasting stations, and KFBI, along with the other (earthbound) portables, was included in the list of stations to be eliminated.

In June 1929, the aircraft was sold again to the Pacific Finance Corporation for $2000 with 550 flight hours logged. The aircraft was dismantled in December 1932.

=== Serial Number 3 ===
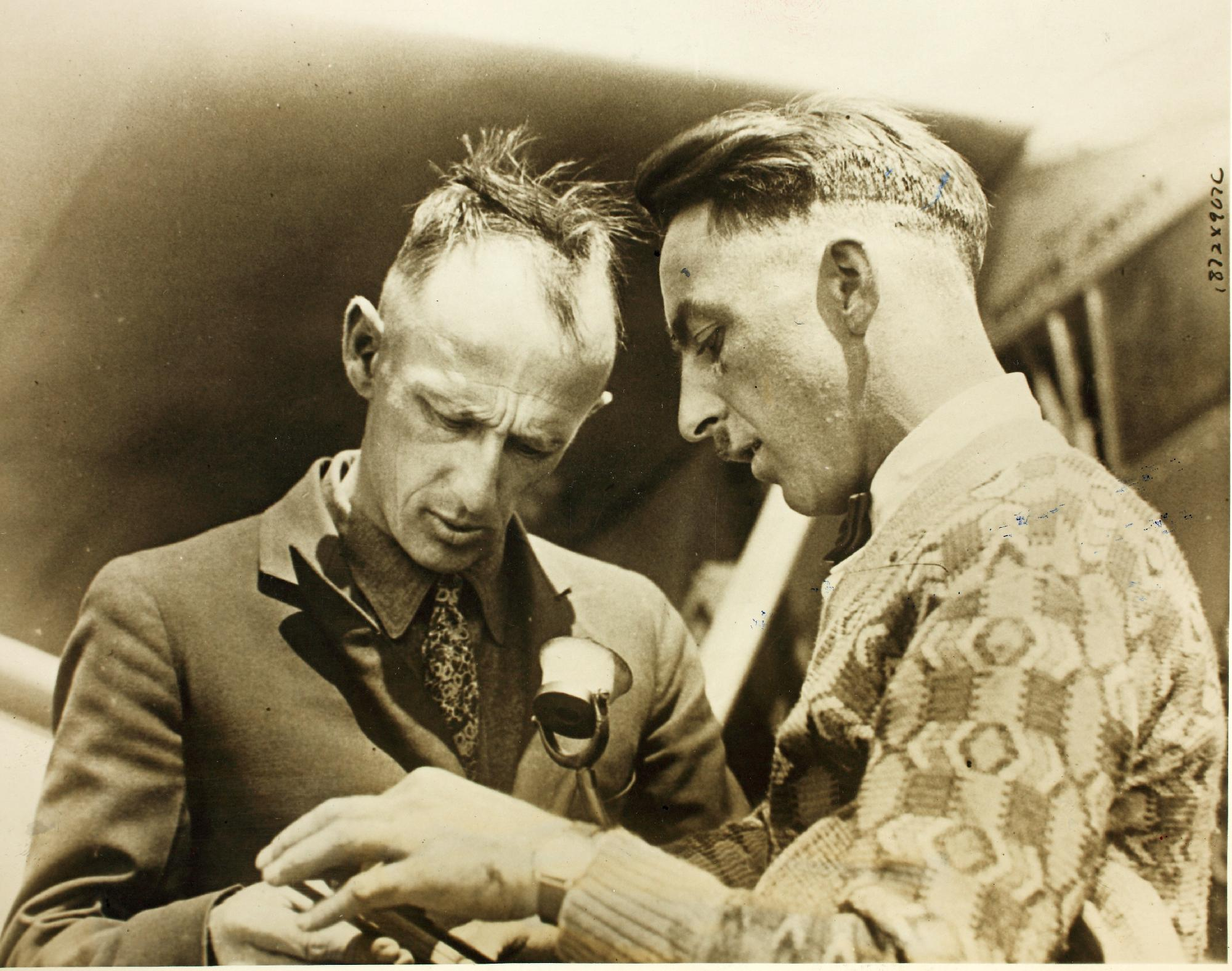
Jensen (L) and Schluter (R), 1927

Aloha, serial number 3 (serial number 5 after modifications), was painted a bright yellow with red lettering across the side. It was purchased and piloted by Martin Jensen, with P.Schluter, a marine navigator responding to an ad for the position. The Aloha placed second in the Dole race, finishing behind "Woolaroc" winning a $10,000 prize. After the record flight, the extra fuel tanks were removed, four seats were added, and it flew around the Hawaiian islands as a Breese "Air Express" for Hawaiian Air Tours. In May 1928 the aircraft was sold for $6000 for a six month private tour of the United States. In November 1929 it was converted again to a five place aircraft with a Wright J-6 engine in New York. In October of that year it was placed into service as an aerial photography aircraft for the New York Daily News. In March 1932, the aircraft was grounded after bending a propeller. In 1933 it was destroyed in a hangar fire in Garden City, New York.

=== Others ===
Varney Air Lines also flew a Wright J-4 powered model as an addition to its Swallow airmail aircraft. It later upgraded the engines to Wright J-5s

The Breese-Wilde company folded in 1928, with Vance Breese moving on to design, fly and create new companies.

== Specifications (Breese-Wilde Model 5) ==
Data from National Air and Space Museum

General characteristics

- Crew: 2
- Length: 27 ft (8.2 m)
- Wingspan: 41 ft (12 m)
- Height: 9 ft 3 in (2.82 m)
- Gross weight: 4,300 lb (1,950 kg)
- Fuel capacity: 300 U.S. gallons (1,100 L; 250 imp gal), 100 U.S. gallons (380 L; 83 imp gal) extra in containers were used on record flights.
- Powerplant: 1 × Wright Whirlwind J5-C Radial, 220 hp (160 kW)

Performance

- Cruise speed: 91 kn (105 mph, 169 km/h)

== See also ==
Related development

- Mason Greater Meteor – Another early aerial broadcast airplane.
