= Mildred Doran =

Canadian aviator (1905–1927)

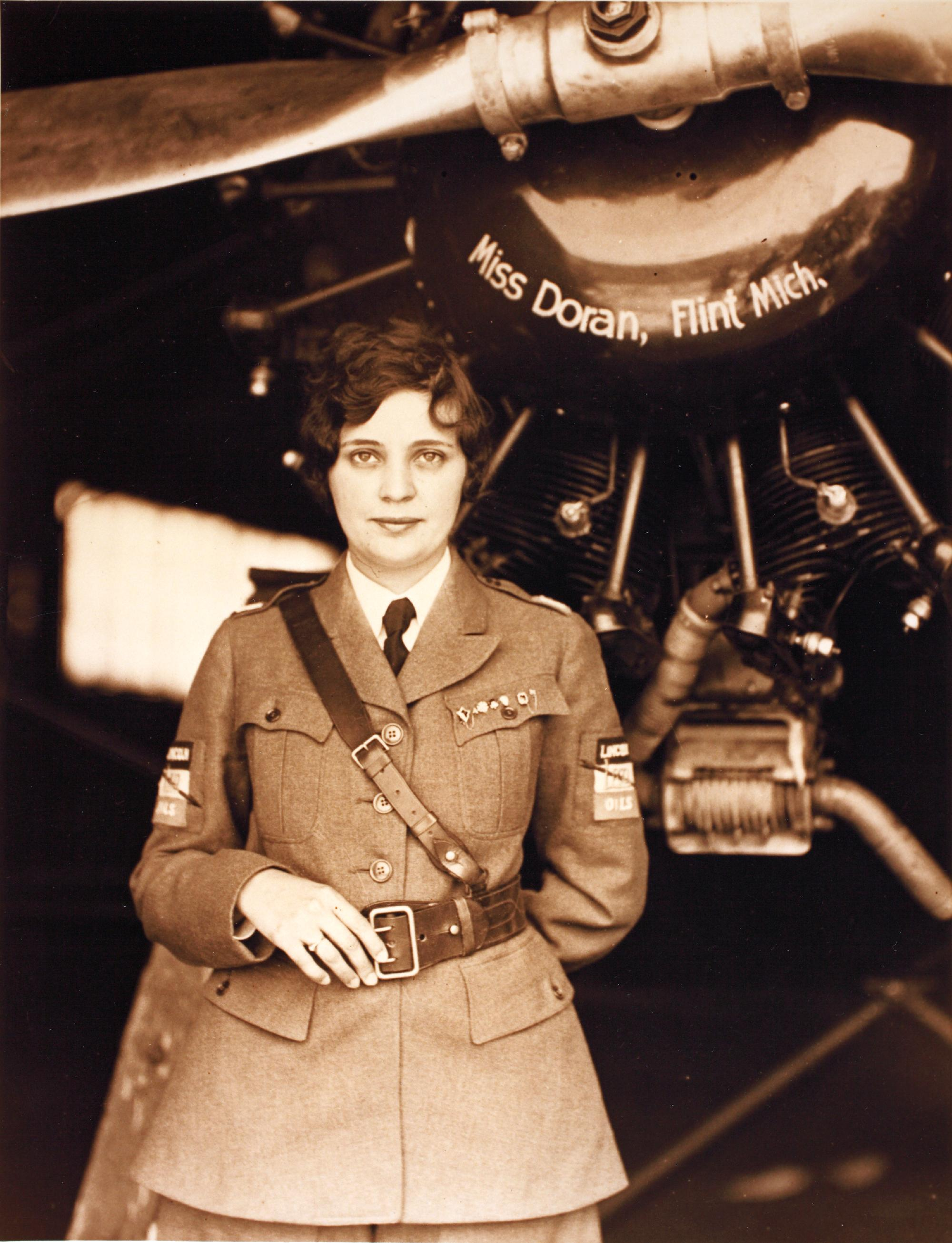
- Mildred Doran in front of the plane
- Born: Mildred Alice Doran; 10 May 1905; Renfrew, Ontario, Canada
- Died: 16 August 1927 (aged 22); Pacific Ocean

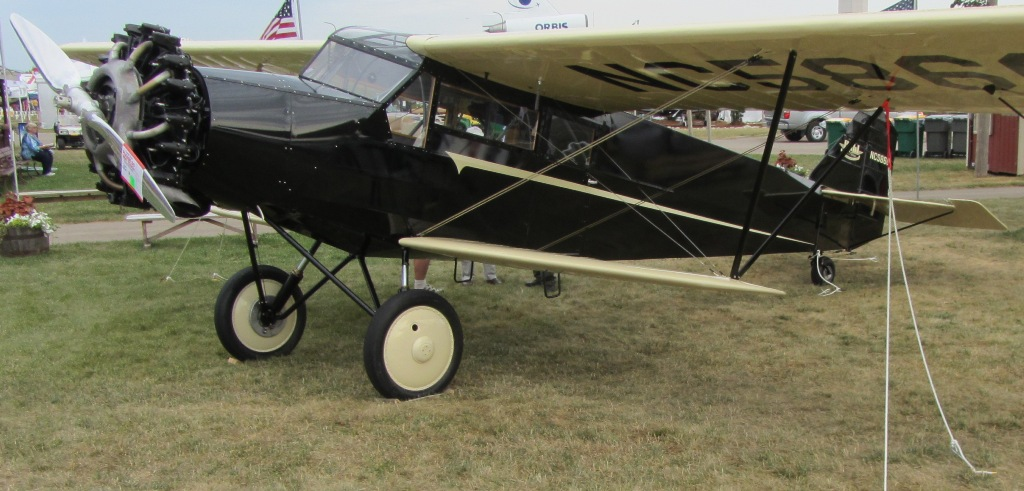
Prototype Buhl Airsedan, the type of plane Mildred Doran entered into the Dole Air Race Derby in 1927

Mildred Alice Doran (10 May 1905 – 16 August 1927) was a Canadian aviation enthusiast who was the only woman to enter the Dole Air Race in 1927, created to be the first to fly from California to Hawaii. During the race, she and several other competitors disappeared.

== Early life and education ==
Doran was born in Ontario to a Canadian father, William Doran, a farmer, and American mother, Minnie Doran. She was raised in Flint, Michigan. Her mother, who was born in Michigan, died 2 December 1921 when Mildred was 16. She raised her younger sister, Helen, and her brothers William and Floyd. Doran worked her way through high school as a telephone operator, continuing to do so after her graduation in 1924. A local businessman and owner of the Lincoln Petroleum Company, William Malloska, heard about her and paid for her to attend a teacher's course at Michigan State Normal School. She became interested in flying at a local airshow while she was in college. By the time of the race she was about 22 years old and working as a fifth-grade school teacher in Caro, Michigan.

While in college, Doran became a member of Alpha Sigma Tau.

== The air-race ==
Doran convinced Malloska to enter an airplane in the Dole Air Race and to allow her to fly along. The plane, a biplane Buhl Airsedan (registration NX2915), was named the Miss Doran in her honour. The pilot was John 'Auggy' Pedlar and the navigator was Vilas Knope.

Because of the attitudes of the day, Doran was popular for interviews with the press. It was considered strange for a woman to take part. She was quoted as saying “A woman should fly just as easily as a man.… Women certainly have the courage and tenacity required for long flights.” Doran wanted to be the first woman to make such an ocean flight. She had been on long overland flights with the crew before.

Despite engine trouble early in the race, and attempts by the crew and crowd to get her to remain behind, Doran stayed with the plane. However, although other planes arrived in Hawaii, nothing was heard from the Miss Doran or her crew again. There was a search by the Army and Navy, and also a competitor's plane which then also went missing after joining the search.

James Dole offered $20,000 to find the missing planes. Malloska added $10,000 to find his friend and the others. Hearst also added a reward. There were many tributes after her death. Ontario, Canada named a lake in her honour and Doran Tower was put up beside Lincoln Field in Flint. The tower was destroyed in 1973 because the owner could no longer afford the taxes.

== See also ==
- List of people who disappeared mysteriously at sea
