= Catron & Fisk CF-10 =

CF-10
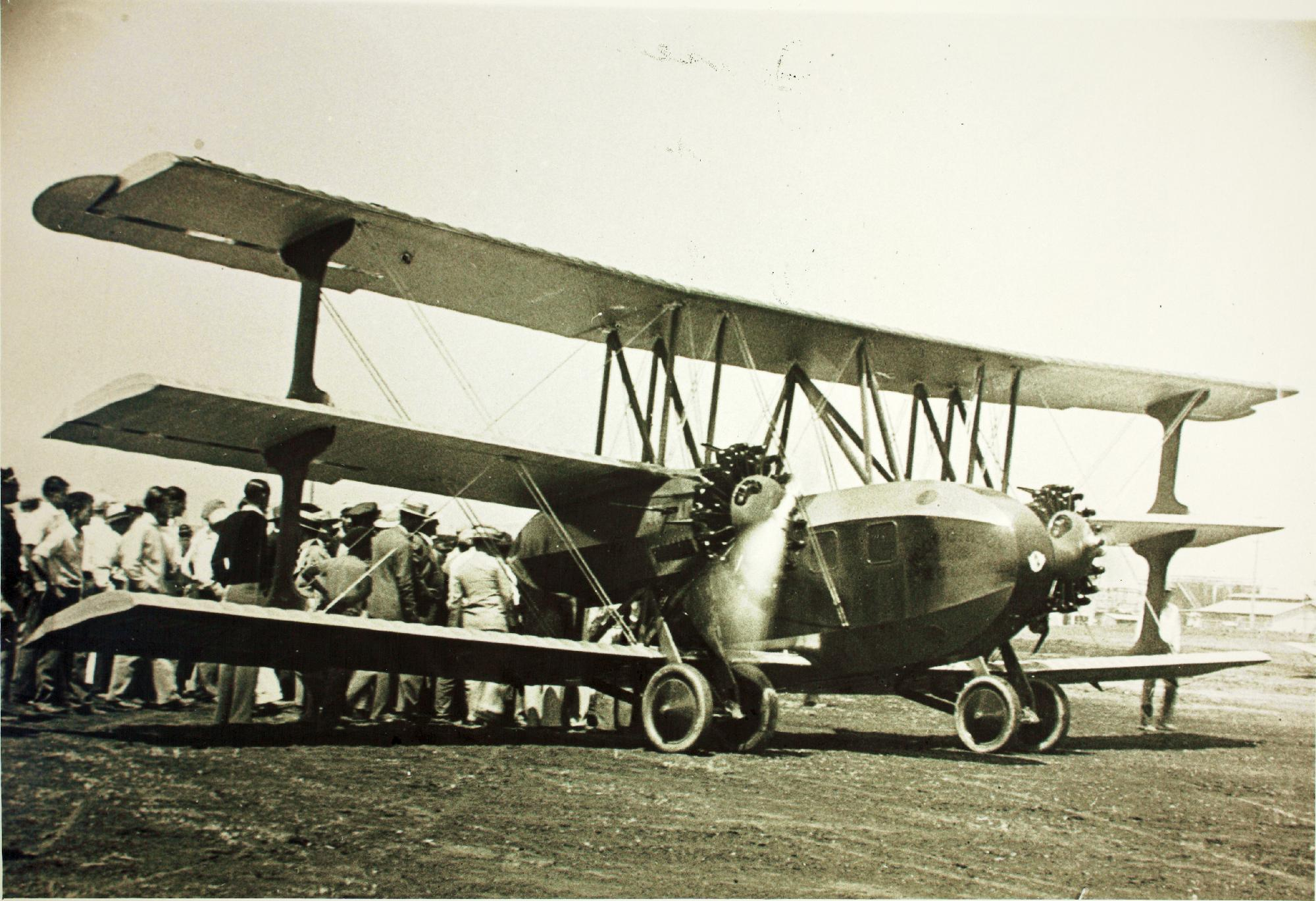
- Pride of Los Angeles

General information
- Type: Triplane
- National origin: United States of America
- Manufacturer: Catron & Fisk Airplane and Engine Co

The Catron & Fisk CF-10 a.k.a. International CF-10 was a triplane airliner developed by the Catron & Fisk Airplane and Engine Co. in the early 1920s. One example of the type was converted for use in the Dole Air Derby endurance race of 1927.

== Development ==
The Catron & Fisk Airplane and Engine Co was founded in 1917, developing several aircraft in series including the CF-10, a 22-passenger airliner. The company was reorganized as International, accounting for the aircraft's dual identity as the International CF-10. The 'Spirit of Los Angeles' modified the CF-10 with long range fuel tanks and update Wright Whirlwind engines to compete in the Dole Air Derby.

== Design ==
The CF-10 was a large twin engined triplane originally powered with Curtiss OX-5 engines. The aircraft featured a conventional landing gear arrangement, with paired main wheels. The twin engines were mounted to either side of the fuselage between the middle and lower wings. The middle wing did not have a full span, each wing only protruded from the engine nacelles outboard, leaving a gap next to the fuselage for visibility. The fuselage was octagonal in shape with a large windowed cabin, and a two-seat open cockpit placed high to the rear of the aircraft. One example, later known as the Pride of Los Angeles, was painted bright orange.

== Operational history ==
In 1927, actor Hoot Gibson, and five other California businessman sponsored The Pride of Los Angeles, a modified version of the International CF-10, for an attempt at winning the Dole Air Derby. Gibson had his name painted on the nose, and face painted on the sides for publicity. On 12 August 1927 before the air race, pilot James L. Giffin, navigator Ted Lundgren, and passenger Lawrence Wiell left Los Angeles and crashed into the San Francisco Bay nose first 300 feet shy of its destination Bay Farm Island airport after veering to avoid another plane. All occupants were thrown from the aircraft and made it to land safely. The sponsor, Gibson was furious.

== Specifications (Catron & Fisk CF-10) ==
Data from Skyways

General characteristics

- Crew: 2
- Wingspan: 45 ft (14 m)
- Fuel capacity: 600 gal
- Powerplant: 2 × Wright J-5 Whirlwind Radial, 230 hp (170 kW) each

Performance

- Cruise speed: 96 kn (110 mph, 180 km/h)
