= Dole Air Race =

Air race, 1927

- Dole Air Race movie reel (Prelinger Archives)
- Category: Air Racing
- Country: United States
- Inaugural season: 1927
- Teams: 8
- Drivers' champion: Arthur C. Goebel

Dole Air Race movie reel (Prelinger Archives)

The Dole Air Race, also known as the Dole Derby, was an air race across the Pacific Ocean from northern California to the Territory of Hawaii in August 1927. Of the 18 official and unofficial entrants, fifteen drew for starting positions; of those fifteen, two were disqualified, two withdrew, and three aircraft crashed before the race, resulting in three deaths. Eight aircraft eventually participated in the start of the race, with only two successfully landed in Hawaii; of the other six, two crashed on takeoff, two were forced to return for repairs, and two went missing during the race. One of the aircraft forced to return for repairs took off again to search for the missing aircraft several days later and also vanished over the sea. In all, before, during, and after the race, ten lives were lost and six airplanes were lost or damaged beyond repair.

== The Dole prize ==
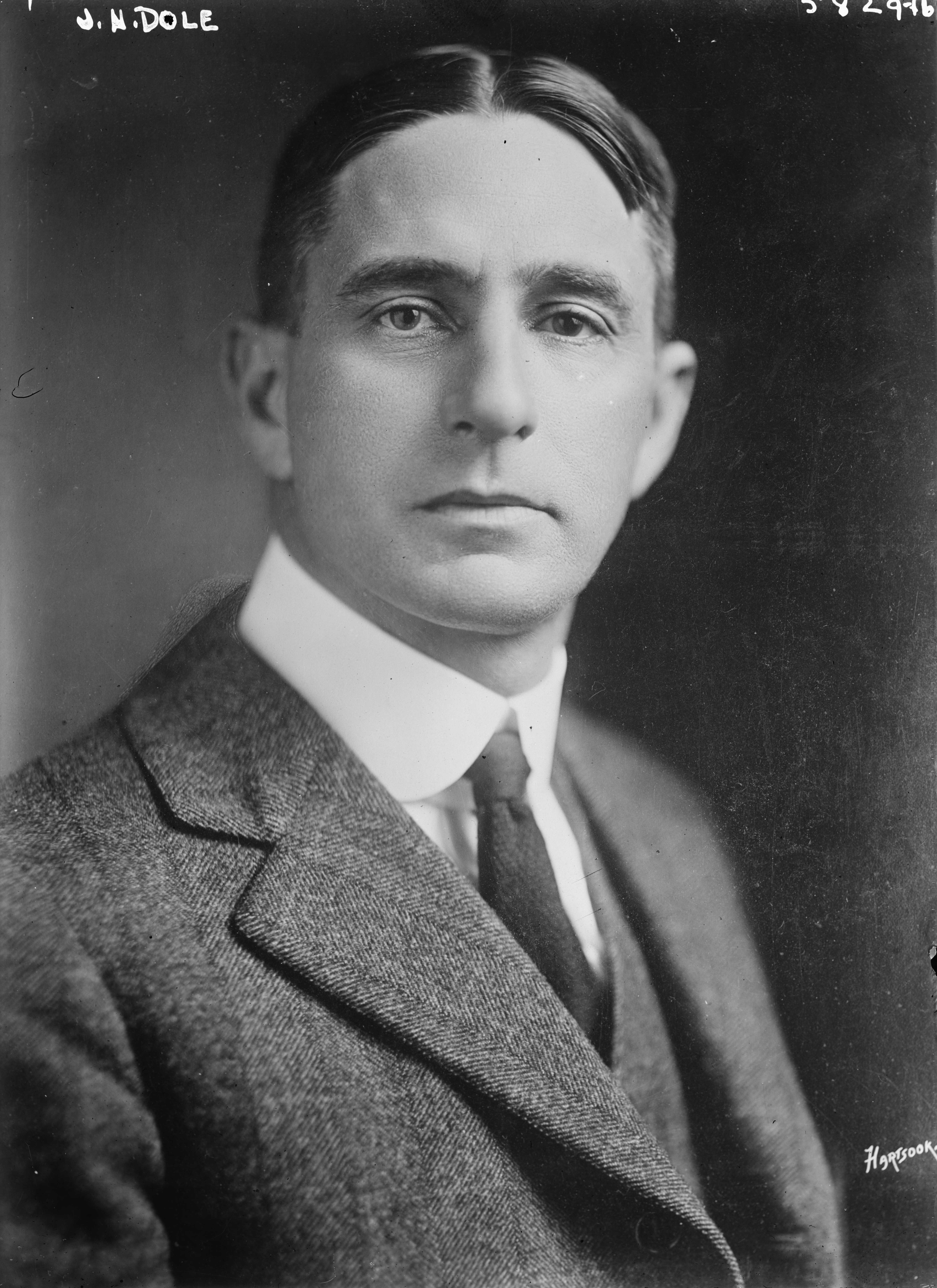
James D Dole

Inspired by Charles A. Lindbergh's successful trans-Atlantic flight, James D. Dole, the Hawaii pineapple magnate, announced on May 25, 1927, a prize of US$25,000 for the first fixed-wing aircraft to fly the 3,870 kilometers (2,405 mi) from Oakland, California, to Honolulu, Hawaii, and US$10,000 for second place. The flights would have to be completed in the 12 months following August 15, 1927. Dole stated he hoped that Lindbergh would compete.

The Honolulu chapter of the National Aeronautic Association drew up the rules for the race.

=== The transpacific record ===
The publicity for the first successful transpacific flights from Oakland to Hawaii was usurped by two flights in June and July 1927, ahead of the scheduled August start for the Dole Derby. On 28 June, about a month after Dole posted the prizes, Air Corps Lieutenants Lester J. Maitland and Albert F. Hegenberger flew a three-engine Atlantic-Fokker C-2 military aircraft from Oakland Municipal Airport to Wheeler Army Airfield on Oahu in 25 hours and 50 minutes. An earlier attempt in 1925 had ended in failure for two Navy PN-9 seaplanes; one of the aircraft, commanded by Commander John Rodgers, ran out of fuel several hundred miles short of Hawaii and sailed to Kauai over the next nine days.

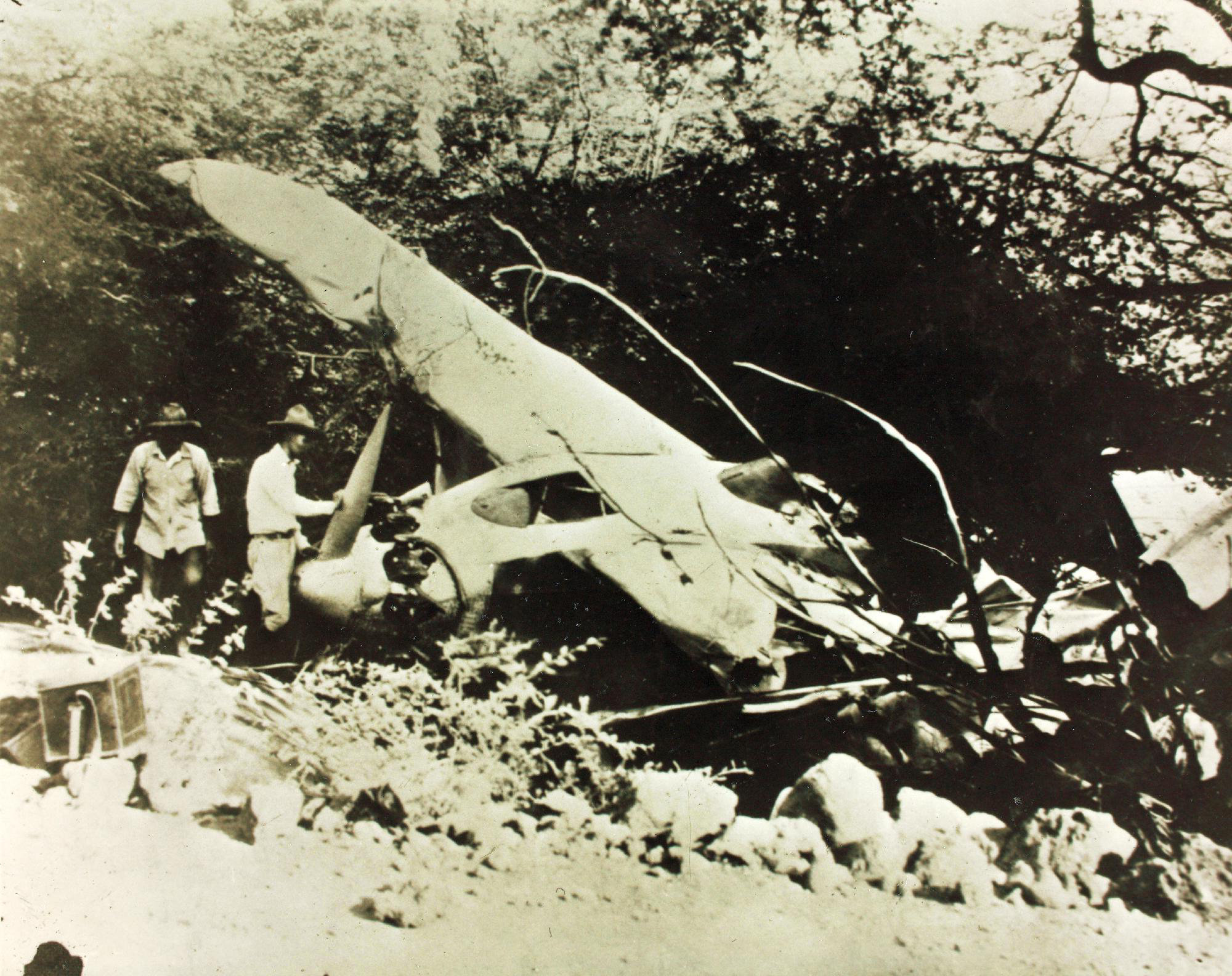
City of Oakland after crash landing on Molokai

Ernie Smith and Captain C.H. Carter had arrived in Oakland earlier to attempt to parallel the Maitland/Hegenberger flight in the City of Oakland, a small Travel Air 5000 civilian monoplane, but due to mechanical difficulties, took off two hours after Maitland, and returned with a broken windshield. Unlike Lindbergh's purpose-built Spirit of St. Louis, City of Oakland had been serving as a mail carrier for Pacific Air Transport. According to Smith, Carter threatened to dump the gas after the windshield was lost, forcing the plane's return shortly after takeoff. Carter quit after the record was lost, but Smith hired Emory Bronte as a navigator, and took off again on July 14. Upon running out of fuel 26 hours and 36 minutes later, they crash-landed in a thorn tree on Molokai.

Dole disqualified the successful June and July flights from his prizes because they had not followed his rules. The Air Corps flight had been planned months prior to the prize announcement with no intended destination other than Wheeler.

By July 22, the starting and ending points had not been set. San Francisco began developing its new municipal airport, Mills Field, in anticipation of enticing pilots into choosing it as the origin; the initial planned destination was John Rodgers Airport near Honolulu.

=== Contestants draw positions ===
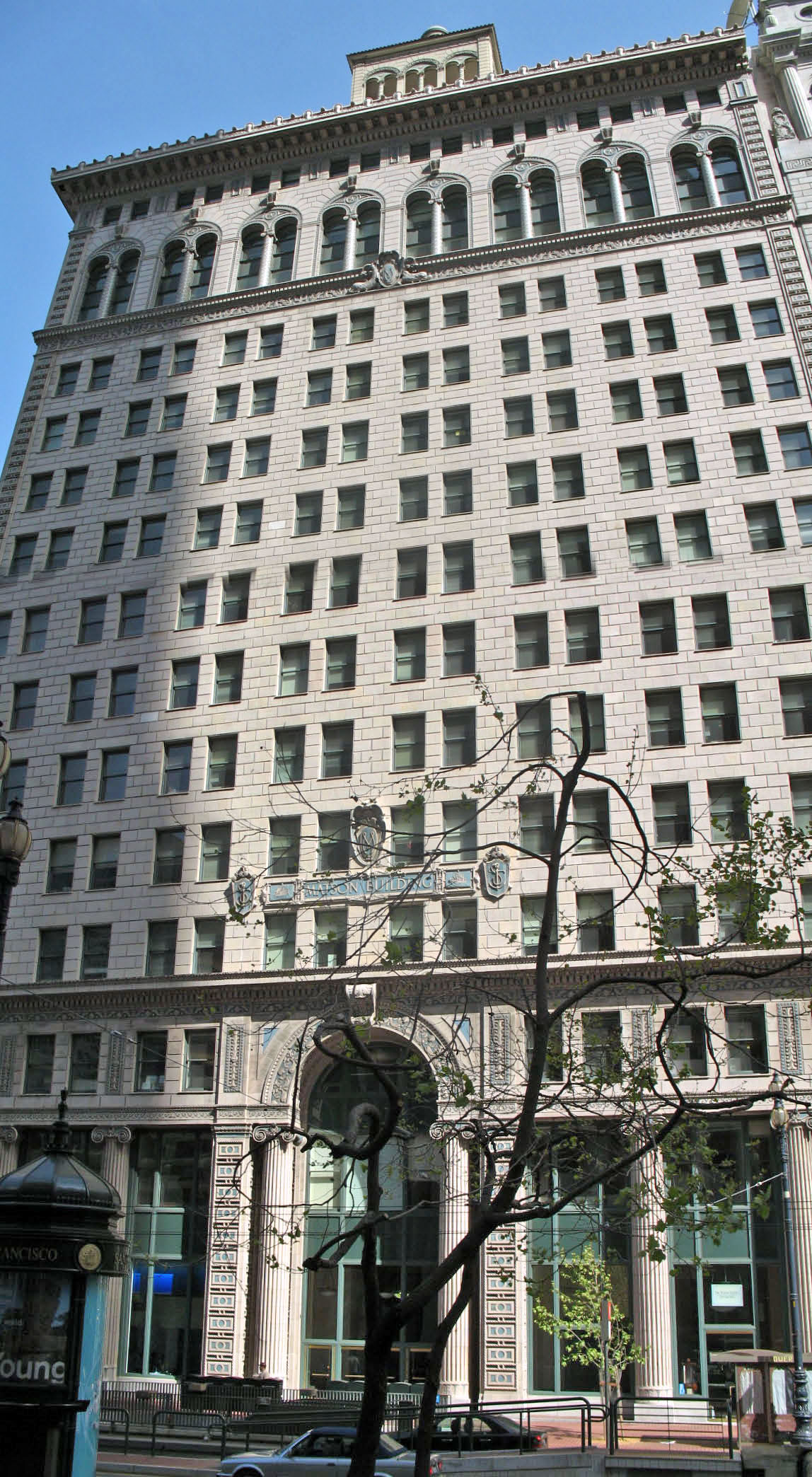
The draw started at the Matson Building.

The first official entrant, announced on June 28, was Arthur C. Goebel. An early entrant was Richard Grace, a Hollywood stunt pilot who shipped his plane to San Francisco shortly after wrecking his Cruzair in a Kauai to San Francisco attempt in June. Fourteen official and four unofficial entrants were announced on August 3; Grace was not part of the group. The draw for starting position in the Dole race was held on 8 August in the office of C. W. Saunders, California director of the National Aeronautics Association, at the Matson Building in San Francisco. In all, fifteen entrants made the official draw; contestants could choose to take off from Mills Field near San Francisco or Oakland Municipal Airport, but the contestants later decided the air currents at Mills were too dangerous and all aircraft were to take off from Oakland instead.

Official and unofficial entrants and starting draw
Entrant				Starting Position	
Official / Unofficial	Pilot	Navigator	From	Drawn	Mills / Oakland
O	Arthur C. Goebel		Santa Monica, CA	9	M (1)
O	Maj. Livingston Irving		Berkeley, CA	7	O (7)
O	John Augie Pedlar (w/ Miss Mildred Doran)	Manley R. Lawing	Flint, MI	4	O (4)
O	Frederick A. Giles		Detroit, MI	6	O (6)
O	Charles W. Parkhurst		Lomax, IL	3	O (3)
O	Lt. N. A. Goddard	Lt. K. C. Hawkins	San Diego, CA	2	O (2)
O	Arthur V. Rogers	Leland A. Bryant	Los Angeles, CA	14	O (11)
O	John W. Frost	Gordon Scott	San Francisco, CA	15	M (2)
O	Bennett Griffin	Al Henley	Bartlesville, OK	1	O (1)
O	Robert C. Fowler		San Francisco, CA	10	—
O	Capt. J. L. Giffin	Theodore Lundgren	Long Beach, CA	8	O (8)
O	Capt. & Mrs. Wm. P. Erwin		Dallas, TX	5	O (5)
O	Frank L. Clarke		Hollywood, CA	12	M (10)
O	George D. Covell		San Diego, CA	13	—
U	Martin Jensen		Honolulu, HI	11	—
U	Robert Horseley		Sarasota, FL	—	—
U	Maj. C. Usborne		Vancouver, BC	—	—
U	Clair Vance		San Francisco, CA	—	—

=== Trouble and confidence before the race ===
Before the race started, many of the aircraft had mechanical issues. Pabco Flyer (Irving) broke a fuel line while conducting a test flight on August 5 from San Francisco to San Diego, and Irving was forced down in a cow pasture near Point Sur, approximately 40 miles (64 km) south of Monterey. Golden Eagle (Frost/Scott) hit a gopher hole on the runway while taking off from San Diego and wrecked the landing gear and propeller. City of Peoria (Parkhurst/Lowes) was delayed by sandflies, and Bluebird (Giles) was stuck at Detroit with engine issues.

Oklahoma (Griffin/Henley) took off on August 4 for an intended nonstop flight from Bartlesville to San Francisco, but was forced down near Amboy by a broken exhaust pipe; after effecting repairs, Oklahoma took off again at approximately 7 AM on August 5, but the aircraft came down again 7 miles (11 km) outside of Los Angeles due to heavy fog.

Spirit of John Rodgers (Covell/Waggener) was also forced down twice during a flight from Brea to San Diego: first near Santa Ana by fog during a test flight on August 5; then again after an oil feed line broke on August 6, forcing the plane down at Escondido. The Tremaine Humming Bird monoplane, which was designed and built by William D. Tremaine, had a wingspan of 47 feet 6 inches (14.48 m) and a low wing configuration, unusual for the time.

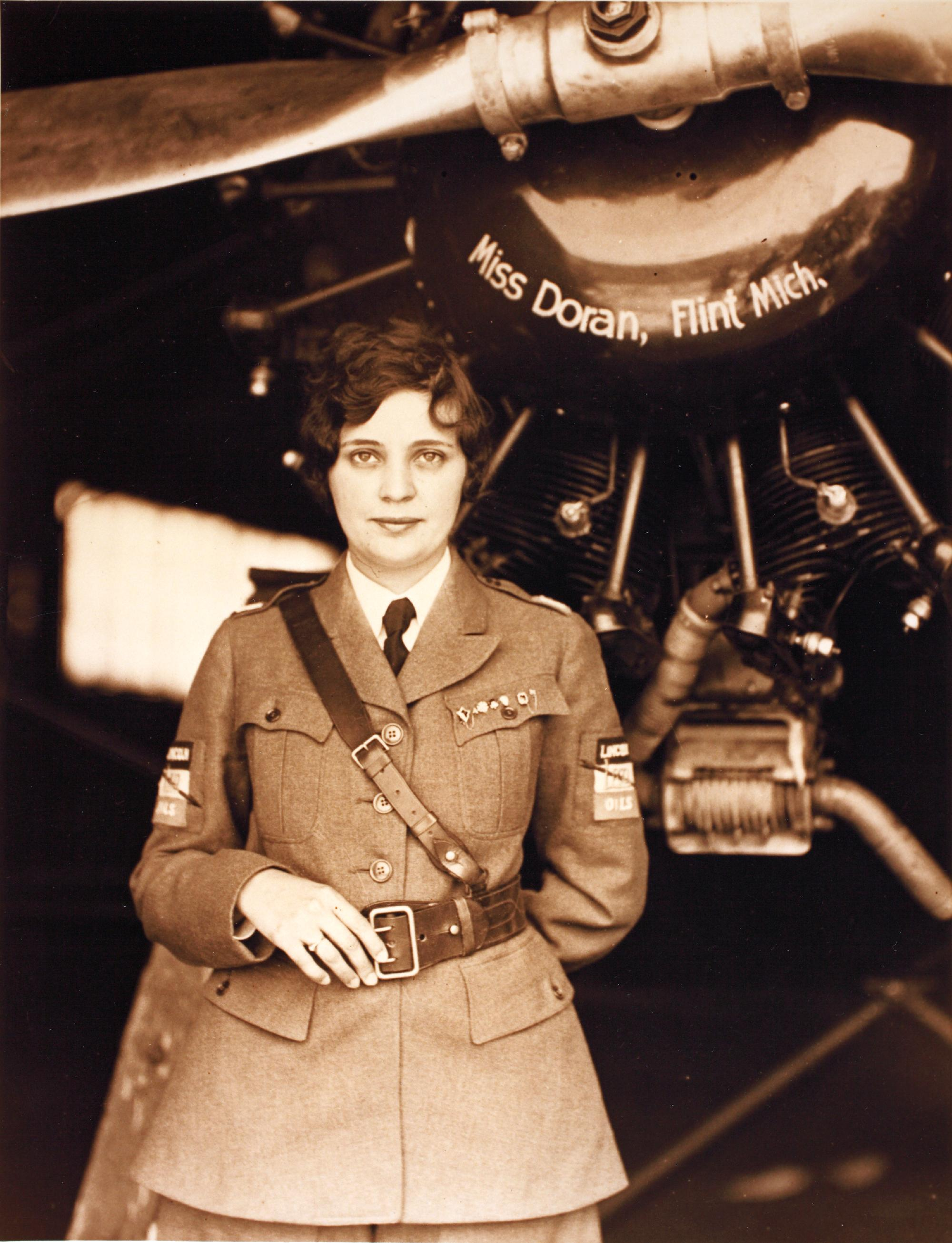
Mildred Doran and the Miss Doran

Meanwhile, Mildred Doran, Auggy Pedlar, and navigator Manley Lawing were flying into Oakland when their aircraft developed engine trouble due to fouled spark plugs. They successfully landed near Mendota in a wheat field in the San Joaquin Valley, but damaged the landing gear in the process and had trouble making repairs because they no longer had any tools. Doran went to Modesto, California to secure tools and a mechanic; she quipped "We threw [the tools] off at Long Beach because they were in the way and cluttering things up." Lawing was later replaced by Vilas R. Knope when Lawing could not satisfy the race committee of his navigational skills. He reportedly got lost over Oakland.

James L. Giffin announced he needed US$15,000 to complete a giant triplane under construction in July 1927; at the time, he was planning to fly it from Los Angeles to Tokyo via Hawaii. After a short test flight on August 10, Giffin confidently predicted they would rest upon arrival in Honolulu, then continue to Australia nonstop, a distance of 4,100 miles (6,600 km). Giffin's intended final destination was Paris, a flight of 30 days in total via Borneo, India, Constantinople, and Rome.

Goddard had already built and tested El Encanto and anticipated it would reach speeds of 120 mph (190 km/h) at takeoff, speeding up to 140 mph (230 km/h) when nearing Honolulu as fuel was consumed, lightening the aircraft. El Encanto means "The Enchanted" and was designed by Goddard after the streamlining of a salmon.

Woolaroc, piloted by Goebel, was originally intended to carry Lieutenant W. J. Slattery as navigator. Goebel departed from Bartlesville on a nonstop flight San Francisco on August 6. In test flights before the race, Goebel's Woolaroc encountered gear issues that required Goebel to hang outside the plane to fix.

Martin Jensen and Robert Fowler competed over the purchase rights for the same Breese-Wilde Model 5; Jensen won that race after his wife Margaret raised US$15,000 from local backers in Honolulu, and Jensen took delivery of Aloha on August 8. Fowler, left without an airplane for the contest, was forced to withdraw. Because Aloha was only completed when the race was nearly about to begin, the preparations for the contest were rushed; the fuel tanks on Aloha only held 130 US gallons (490 L) and the original plan was to add sufficient spare fuel capacity via forty-nine portable 5 US gal (19 L) containers, requiring the navigator to fill the central tank, then transfer fuel to the 50 US gal (190 L) tank in use via a hand pump; the plane was later retrofitted with a 405 US gal (1,530 L) tank, obviating the need for the complicated refueling plan, which would have required the passing of written messages between the two men.

=== Three days: three crashes, three dead ===
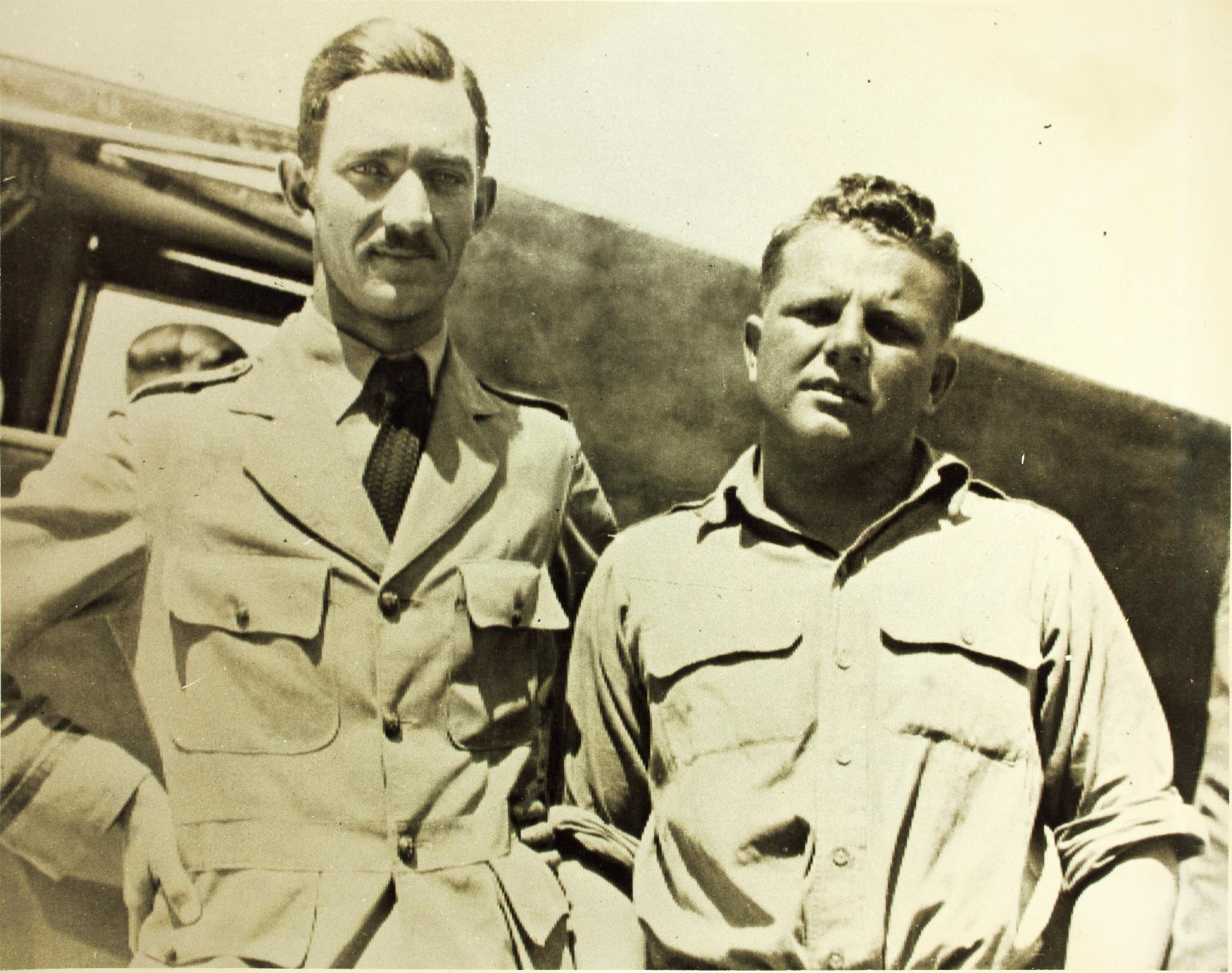
Covell & Waggener, Spirit of John Rodgers

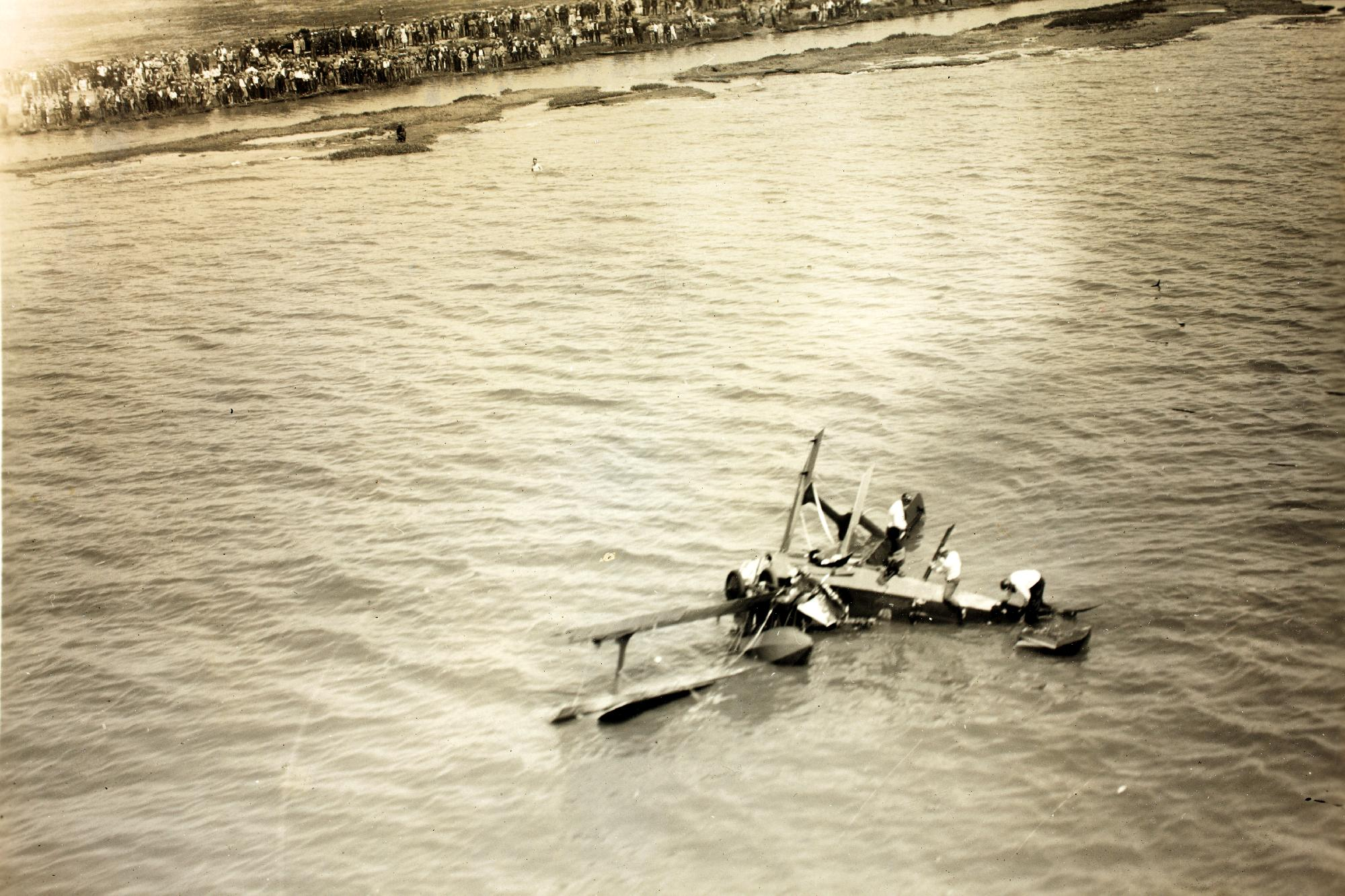
Pride of Los Angeles in San Francisco Bay

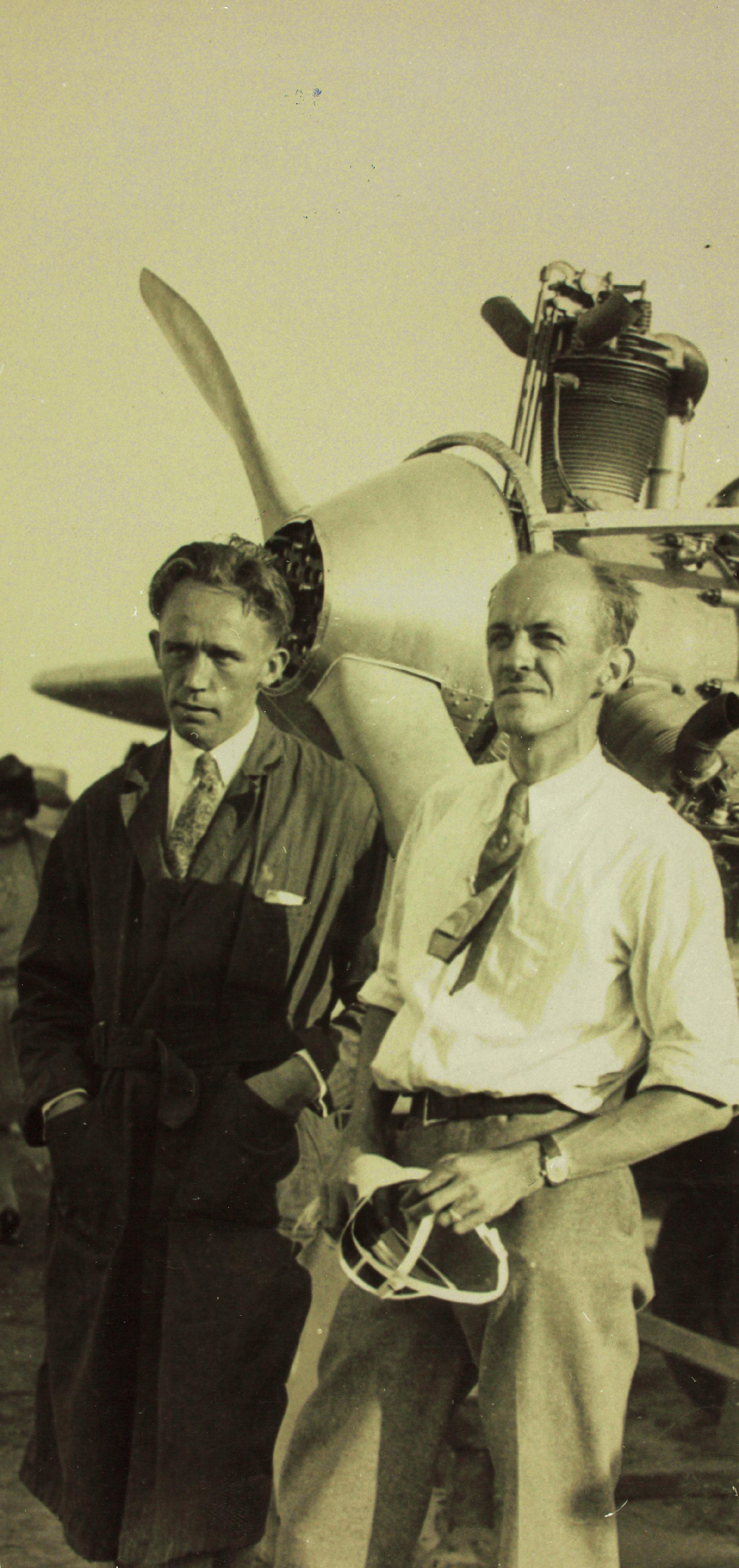
Rogers (L) & Bryant (R), Angel of LA

Three crashes in three days (Aug 10–12, 1927) leading up to the start of the race

Two days after they drew the thirteenth position, on August 10 United States Navy Lieutenants George W. D. Covell and R. S. Waggener took off from San Diego, California in their Tremaine Humming Bird named Spirit of John Rodgers to fly to Oakland; after flying into a fog bank, the aircraft crashed into an ocean cliff at Point Loma, killing both men. Waggener had replaced Lt. Leo Pawlikowski as navigator; Pawlikowski had developed an abscess on his back which required surgery, and the doctors would not allow him to participate. William Davis, a Navy Lieutenant who would serve as the navigator for Art Goebel on Woolaroc, was granted leave to participate in the race; he had planned to catch a ride with Covell and Waggener to San Francisco, but the leave was not granted in time, and he took a train from San Diego instead.

Then, on 11 August, as J. L. Giffin and Theodore S. Lundgren approached Oakland, their aircraft, an International CF-10 Triplane, the Pride of Los Angeles, crashed into San Francisco Bay, but the two men and their passenger, Laurence Willes, were able to escape and swim to shore.

The next day, shortly after British ace Arthur V. Rogers took off for a test flight on August 12 in the twin engine Angel of Los Angeles at Western Air Express Field at Montebello, California, the aircraft reached an altitude of 200 feet (61 m) and began acting "queer"; Rogers jumped out of the plane as it suddenly dived towards the ground, but died as either his foot or parachute snagged on the aircraft as it crashed. Leland A. Bryant, the designer of the aircraft, was to have served as Rogers's navigator, but was not onboard during the test flight.

=== Withdrawals and disqualifications ===
Maj. Livingston Irving was the first pilot to qualify for the contest. During the pre-race inspections, Major Clarence Young declared that up to ten of the fifteen entries may be disqualified for inadequate fuel capacity; the rule stated that a single-engine aircraft was required to carry 460 US gallons (1,700 L) of fuel, a nominal capacity of 400 US gallons (1,500 L) plus a 15% reserve. Another rule was interpreted to require pilots to hold commercial licenses, which five unnamed pilots did not have.

Arose a horde of pompous men to boss the job, as you may ken; made sets of rules to puzzle, fool, as though the racers saw no school; they plotted charts, allotted starts, ruled on gas tanks, criticized parts, befuzzled everything worse 'n tarts till they wracked people's nerves, upset hearts — pray tell me why.

— Frank L. Phillips, race team sponsor, Healdsburg Tribune, August 12, 1927

The race, originally scheduled to start on August 12, was postponed on August 11, in light of the numerous mechanical issues, failed qualification tests, and poor weather. Several contestants protested the delay, and the Honolulu chapter of the National Aeronautic Association refused to endorse the recommendation of the Oakland chapter to postpone, meaning the race would proceed. However, nine of the contestants agreed to postpone the contest late in the evening of August 11, which would give the teams time to rest and pass the stringent qualification tests; the deadline to qualify was extended to 10 AM on August 15.

A three-part qualification test was administered to the navigators by Naval Lieutenant Ben H. Wyatt, consisting of a written, oral, and flying examination. For the flight exam, the pilot and navigator were sent over a predetermined course and upon their return, quizzed to determine which points they had passed. By August 11, none of the crews had passed the test. Pedlar's Miss Doran was found to have inaccurate compasses. Later, it was noted that only two teams had qualified (El Encanto and Golden Eagle), with one more likely to qualify (Oklahoma) by the original date of Friday, August 12. On August 12, four crews had passed: Oklahoma (Griffin/Henley), El Encanto (Goddard/Hawkins), Pabco Pacific Flyer (Irving), and Golden Eagle (Frost/Scott). Miss Doran (Pedlar/Knope) passed with a new navigator on August 13. By the qualification deadline of August 15, nine crews had passed the tests; Dallas Spirit was the final qualifier.

On August 10, Hollywood pilot and actor Frank Clarke either withdrew or was disqualified from participating in the race with his navigator, Jeff Warren, in Miss Hollydale, an International F-17 biplane. Clarke announced he would attempt the world endurance record instead and took off abruptly on August 13 with his sponsor, Charley H. Babb, leaving the other contestants fuming. One day later, Clarke sent a telegram to the race sponsors from Los Angeles, apologizing for the furor and officially withdrawing from the race.

On August 15, Frederick Giles was disqualified as he had not arrived in time to meet the navigation qualification test deadline. Giles would go on to attempt a solo flight from San Francisco to Honolulu in November as the first leg of a planned flight to Australia. A missing component on the Miss Doran compass sparked fears of vandalism the night before the flight.

The Air King (City of Peoria) flown by Charles Parkhurst Lomax and Ralph C. Lower Jr., was disqualified at 11:15 AM on the 16th, less than an hour before the first plane would start, because its 370-gallon tanks were estimated to give the plane a range 300 miles short by inspectors.

=== Final participants ===
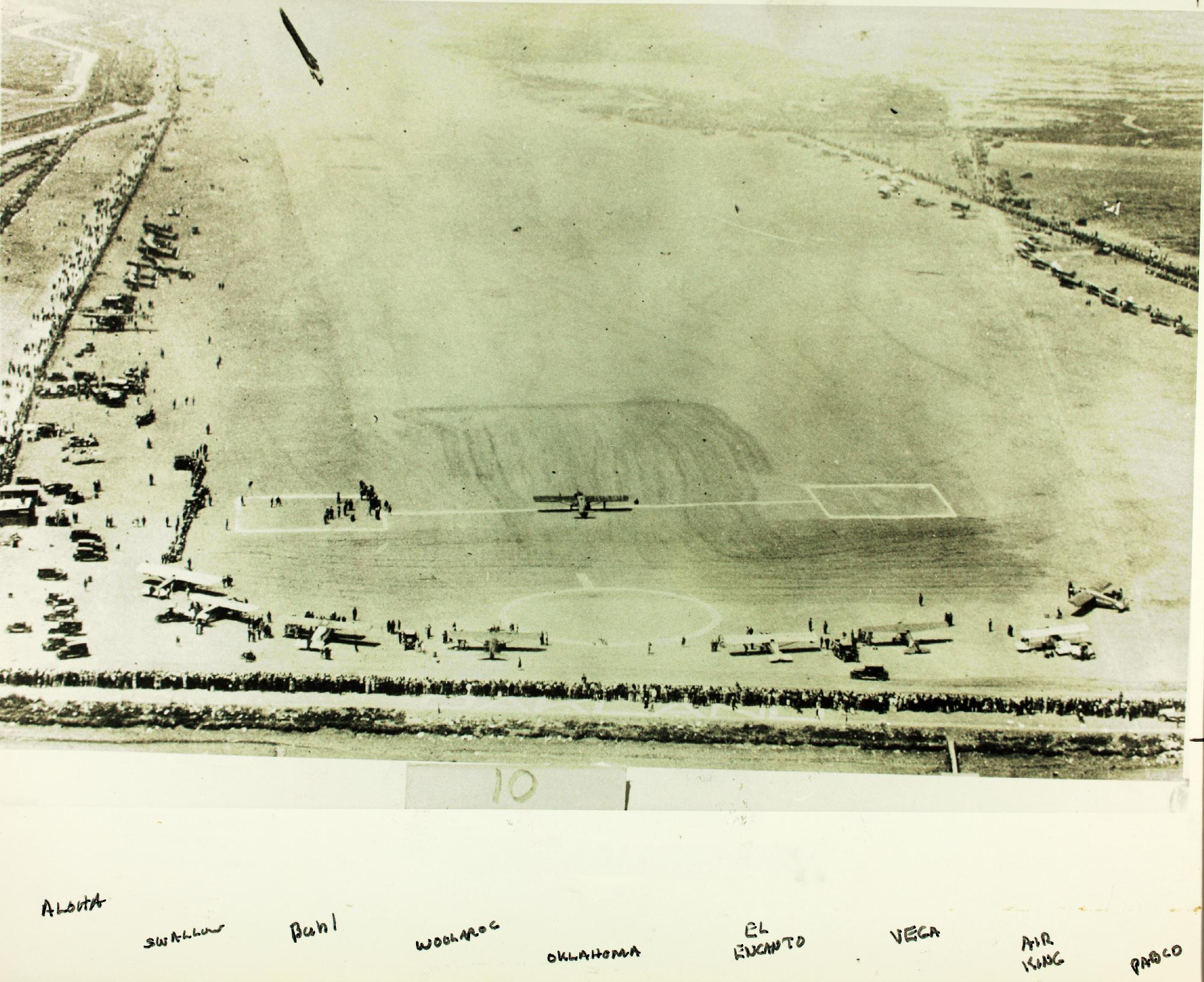
Entrants lined up to take off from Oakland on August 16, 1927. Oklahoma is at the start of the runway. From left to right the others are: Aloha, Dallas Spirit, Miss Doran, Woolaroc, El Encanto, Golden Eagle, City of Peoria, and Pabco Pacific Flyer

The race began on 16 August, by which time the starting line-up had dwindled to nine aircraft, with one of the nine disqualified just before the start of the race. In order of start, they were:

1. Oklahoma, one of two modified Travel Air 5000 aircraft, NX911, piloted by Bennett Griffin and navigated by Al Henley
2. El Encanto, a Goddard Special metal monoplane, NX5074, flown by Norman A. Goddard and Kenneth C. Hawkins, which was heavily favored in the pre-race odds
3. Pabco Pacific Flyer, a Breese-Wilde Monoplane, NX646, flown alone by Livingston Gilson Irving
4. Golden Eagle, the prototype Lockheed Vega 1 monoplane, NX913, flown by Jack Frost and navigated by Gordon Scott
5. Miss Doran, a Buhl CA-5 Air Sedan, NX2915, flown by Auggy Pedlar, navigated by Vilas R. Knope, and carrying Mildred Doran
6. DQ City of Peoria, an Air King biplane, NX3070, flown by Charles Parkhurst and navigated by Ralph Lowes, disqualified the day of the hop-off for inadequate fuel capacity
7. Aloha, a Breese-Wilde 5 Monoplane, NX914, flown by Martin Jensen and navigated by Paul Schluter
8. Woolaroc, a Travel Air 5000 sister ship of Oklahoma, NX869, flown by Arthur C. Goebel and navigated by William V. Davis
9. Dallas Spirit, a Swallow Monoplane, NX941, flown by William Portwood Erwin and navigated by Alvin Eichwaldt

=== Oakland start ===
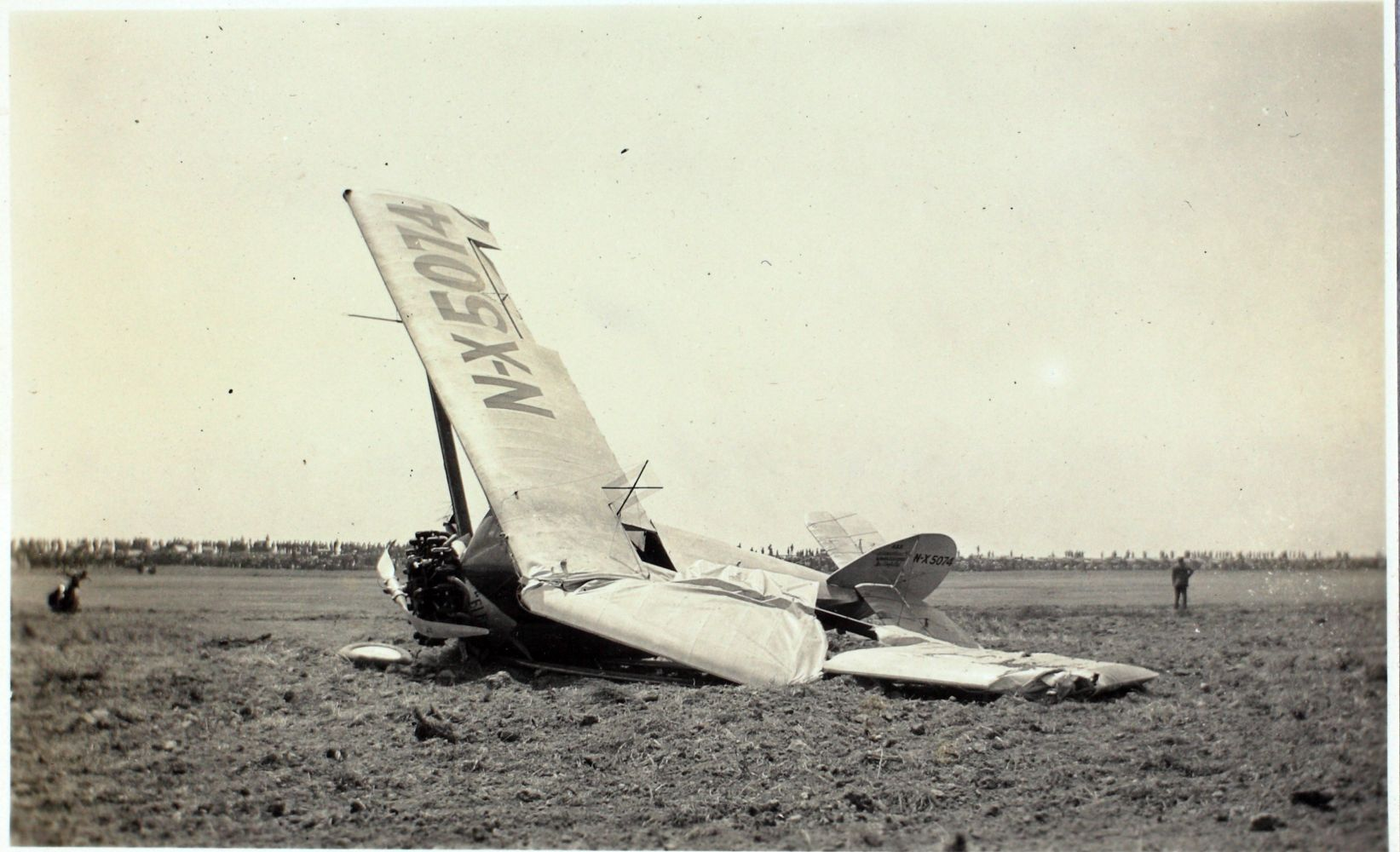
El Encanto (NX5074) after takeoff and crash

The fifteen competitors were seen off by a crowd estimated to include 75,000 to 100,000 persons on August 16, 1927. Weather was predicted to have a high fog on takeoff and showers along the route. A fog bank started at the Golden Gate and the entire route was overcast. At Oakland Municipal Airport, clearance to depart was not granted until just before noon; the fog that had lain over the airport did not lift until 10:40 AM.

The initial takeoffs were plagued with trouble, as several of the heavily-laden aircraft struggled to take off. Oklahoma took off first, just after 12 PM. The crew would eventually abort the flight over San Francisco with an overheating engine. She was followed by El Encanto at 12:02 PM, which failed to clear the runway before she swerved and crashed, smashing the port wing 4,800 feet (1,500 m) from the starting line. Pabco Flyer, starting at 12:09 PM, lifted momentarily into the air, then crashed some 7,000 feet (2,100 m) feet from the start. Their crews were not hurt. Golden Eagle took off smoothly at 12:30 PM and flew out of sight. Miss Doran succeeded in taking off at 12:31 PM. The final three, Aloha (at 12:33 PM), Woolaroc (12:34 PM), and Dallas Spirit (12:36 PM) all took off uneventfully.

Oklahoma passed through the Golden Gate at 12:20 PM, followed by Aloha at 12:48. Aircraft then began to return: Oklahoma returned to Oakland and Dallas Spirit turned back shortly after taking off, both returning at approximately 1:08 PM; Oklahoma had ripped the fabric covering the fuselage, and Dallas Spirit was having issues with its tail gear. Miss Doran circled back and landed approximately ten minutes later (1:24 PM), its engine "sputtering like a Tin Lizzie."

Miss Doran and Pabco Flyer would make second attempts to take off; Pabco Flyer crashed a second time at 1 PM, rendering it unflyable, but Miss Doran succeeded at 2 PM. Of the fifteen teams that participated in the draw, just four were on the course: Golden Eagle, Aloha, Woolaroc, and Miss Doran.

=== Results ===
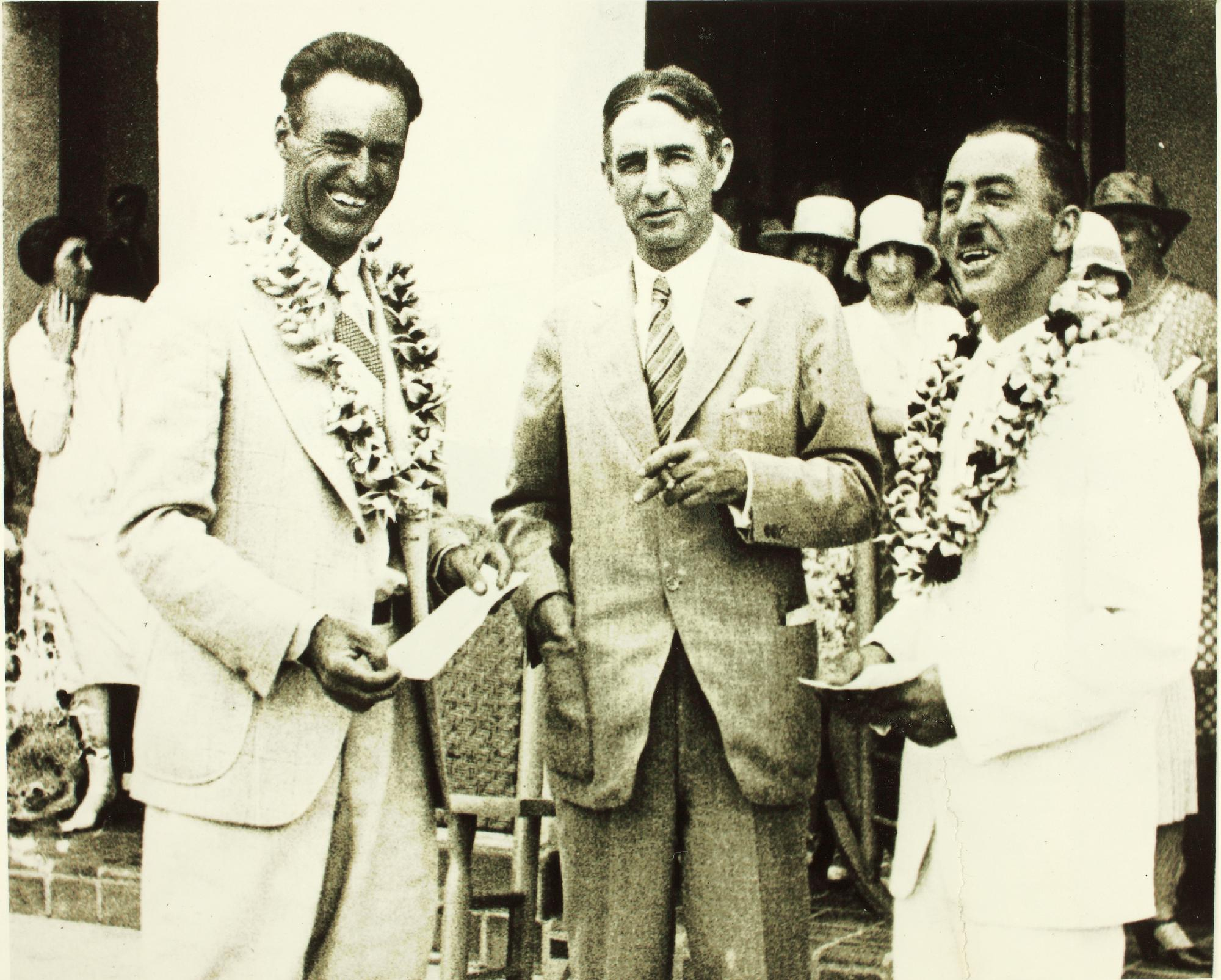
Dole (center) awards prizes to Goebel (L) and Jensen (R)

Woolaroc flew a great-circle route, flying at an altitude of 4,000 to 6,000 feet (1,200 to 1,800 m), above the cloud cover. The navigator, Davis, used sextants and smoke bombs to calculate course and wind drift; although the radio beams from the picket ships stationed along the route helped guide the aircraft, Davis used it only to check the course plotted via traditional instruments. Of the four aircraft headed to Hawaii, only Woolaroc had a two-way radio capable of sending and receiving messages. In fact, Davis had packed a spare radio and repair parts based on Bronte's prior experience in July. The crew radioed Wahiawa Radio Station, next to Wheeler Field, when they were approximately 200 miles (320 km) out with an estimated remaining time of 2 1/2 hours. They were greeted in Hawaii by a crowd estimated between 25,000 and 30,000, and escorted by a Boeing PW-9 out of Wheeler Field. Goebel and Davis won the race in 26 hours, 17 minutes, earning them the US$25,000 first prize. The wife of Martin Jensen anxiously asked them if they had sighted Aloha, who had left ahead of Woolaroc; they replied they had not, adding to her anxiety.

Aloha arrived approximately two hours later, in 28 hours, 16 minutes, earning Jensen and Schluter the US$10,000 second prize. Out of his $10,000 winnings, pilot Jensen gave his navigator Schluter only $25. Jensen flew much of the way at a low altitude of 10 to 50 feet (3.0 to 15.2 m) above sea level, helping fuel economy but making it impossible to sight the stars for navigation. Three times during the flight, Jensen attempted to climb to 4,000 feet (1,200 m), but went into a tailspin each time; once Jensen inadvertently commanded a shallow dive and skimmed the water with the landing gear, prompting him to rise to a safer altitude of 500 feet (150 m). Two and a half hours were consumed while circling in order for the navigator to determine their position from the sun. When they landed, Aloha had only 5 US gallons (19 L) of fuel remaining; in order to ensure the engine never starved for fuel, the crew needed to pump the gravity-fed tank to overflowing.

=== Three aircraft disappear; seven more die ===
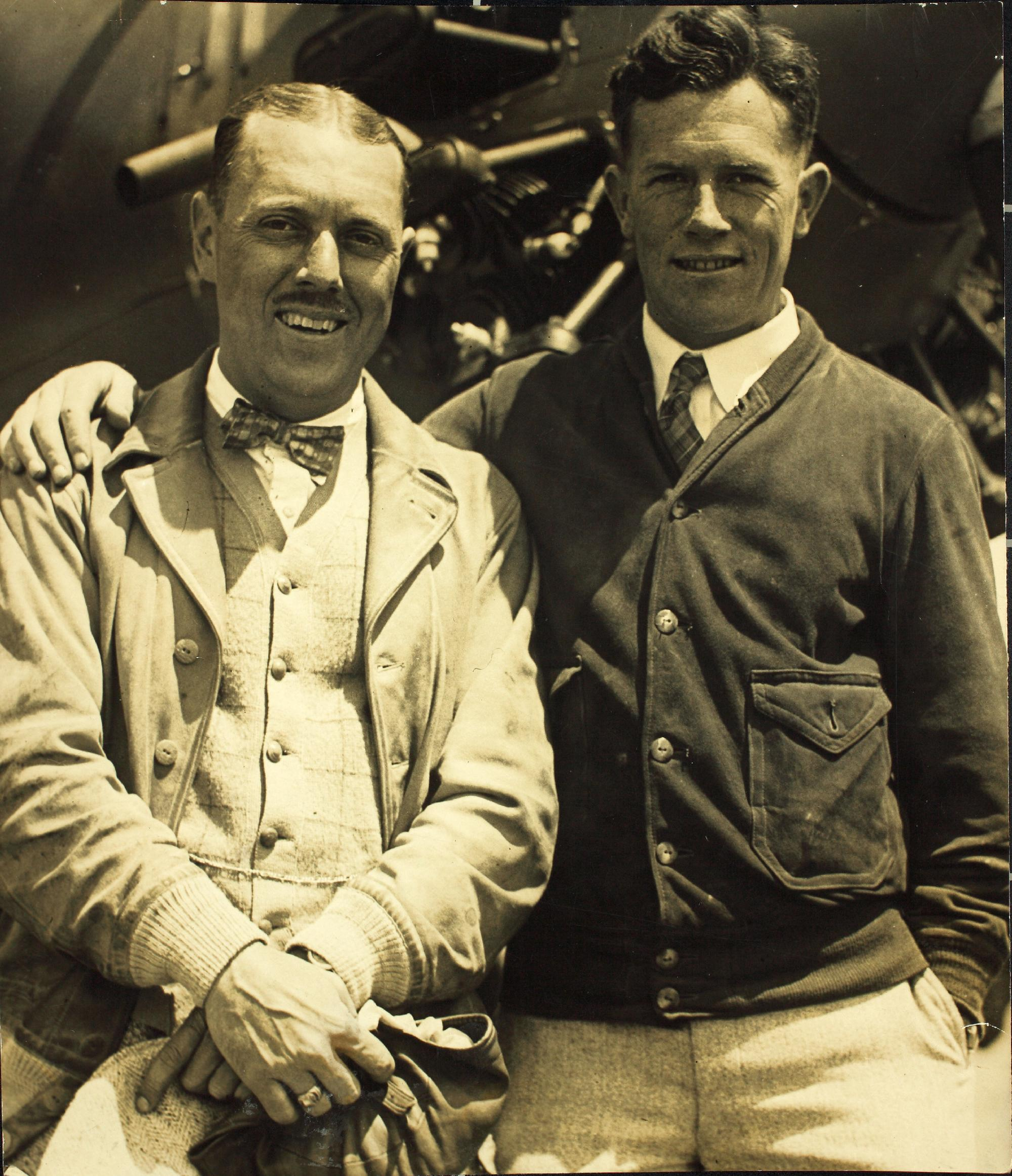
Golden Eagle: Frost (L) & Scott (R)

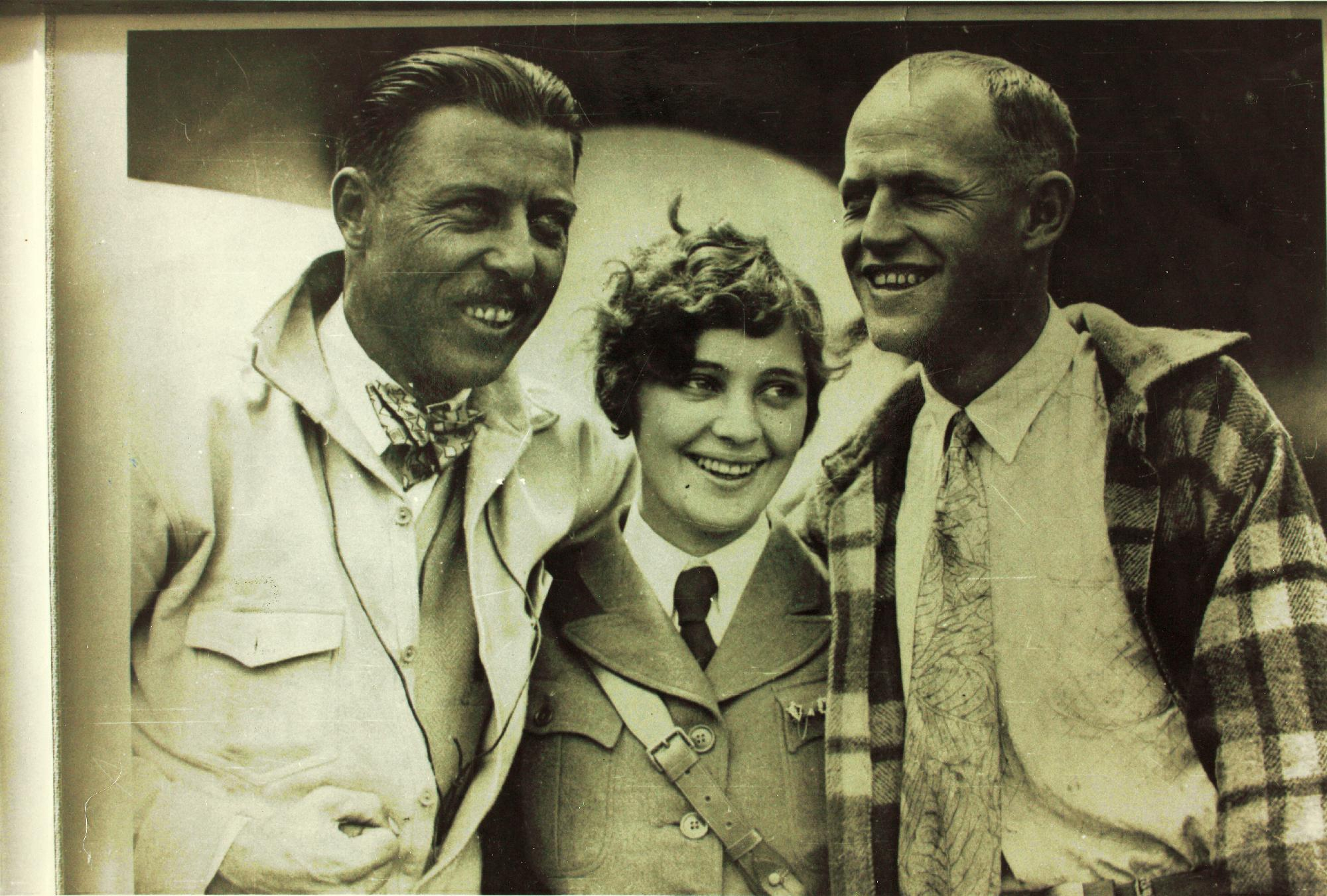
Miss Doran: Knope, Doran, and Pedler (L–R)

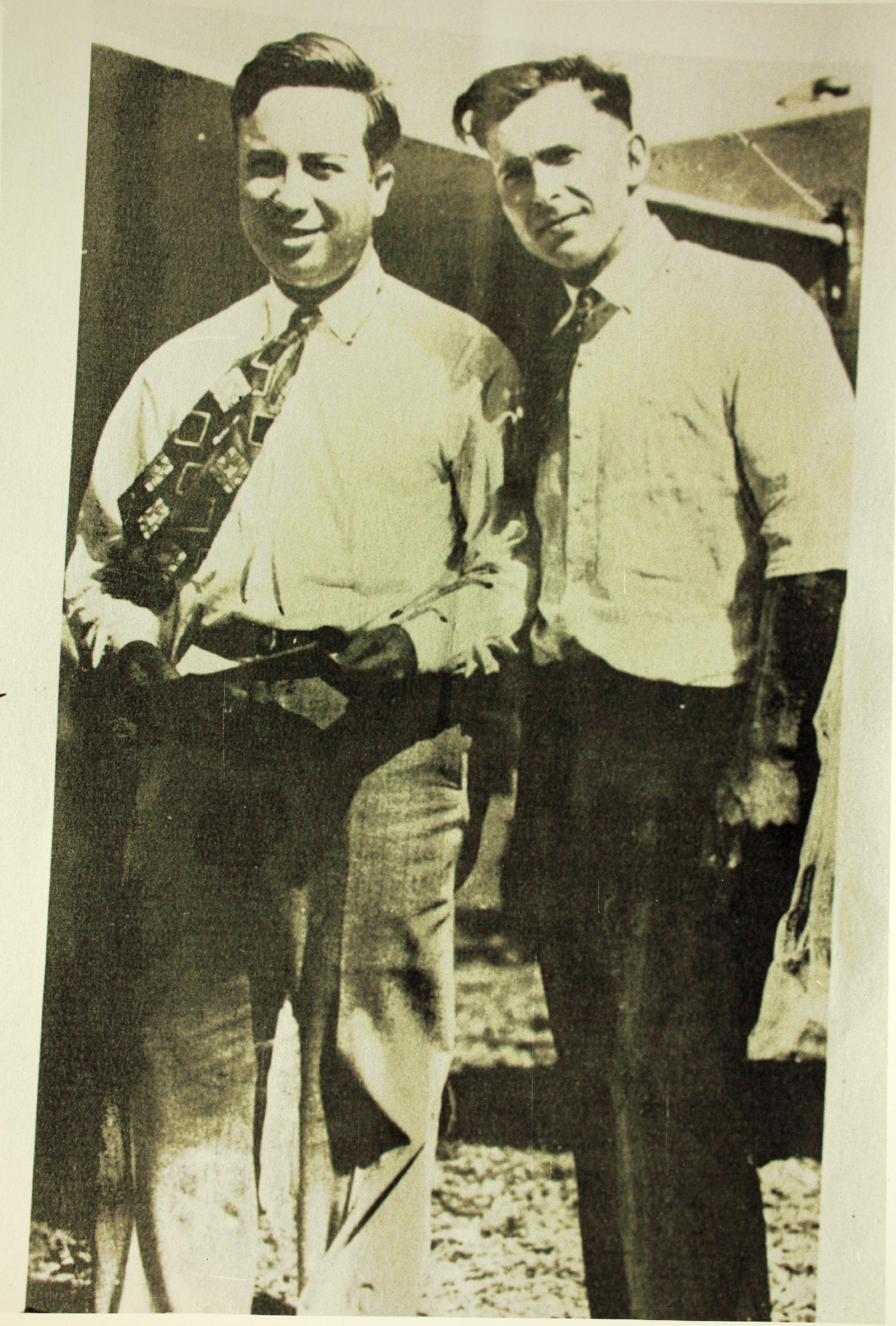
Dallas Spirit: Erwin (L) & Eichwaldt (R)

Aircraft crews that disappeared over the sea, Aug 16 & 19

Neither Golden Eagle nor Miss Doran was ever seen again. Golden Eagle had a radio capable of reception only and could use the shipboard radio signals for navigation. Dole put up a US$10,000 reward for anyone who found either plane; this was matched by each plane's sponsors, for a total of US$20,000 reward for each aircraft.

According to Wyatt, the radial engine of Miss Doran was missing four of nine cylinders when it returned to Oakland; he believed the aircraft had gone down shortly after entering the fog bank just off the Golden Gate.

The search for the Golden Eagle and Miss Doran was aided by three submarines, USS R-8, USS S-42, and USS S-46. After repairing Dallas Spirit, Erwin and Eichwaldt joined the search, leaving Oakland for Honolulu on August 19. Their last radio message, received at 9 PM that night, was that they were in a tailspin approximately 600 miles (970 km) out to sea. Dallas Spirit was also never seen again.

A silver-colored piece of an aileron washed ashore at Redondo Beach in October 1927; it may have come from Dallas Spirit, based on the color. The reward was withdrawn by James Dole in March 1928. In April 1929, the wreckage of an unidentified aircraft washed ashore near Carmel. The final search for the missing aviators concluded in June 1929, as Jack Frost's brother followed up a theory the Golden Eagle may have crash landed on Mauna Loa.

=== Aftermath ===
In the days after the race, the disqualified owners of the Air King charged that race officials should have disqualified the Golden Eagle, because it also had only 350 gallons of fuel capacity when it took off. In a bitter conclusion, the father of the sponsor of the race, Rev. Charles F. Dole, died on November 27, 1927.

Goebel and Davis returned on the Matson liner SS Manoa to an impromptu parade in San Francisco where they doubted there would be any survivors of a sea ditching. Woolaroc has survived and is on display at the Woolaroc Museum in Oklahoma, which started as a hangar to store and display the plane.

Both Ernie Smith, pilot of the first civilian nonstop flight to Hawaii, and Ben Wyatt, navigation examiner for the Dole Air Race, criticized the race after its conclusion. Smith called it "stunt flying – not practical with land planes. And now there are six men and a girl out there somewhere battling for their lives. All for $35,000. It isn't worth it." Wyatt believed that "[no] scientific value can be derived from such flights [with land planes]."

On September 16, SS Maui spread flowers and a floral Bible made by Miss Doran's students was released on the spot where the last message was received from the Dallas Spirit. Each of the seven who died was eulogized and Tennyson's poem "Crossing the Bar" was recited.

Constance Erwin, the wife of Bill, who piloted Dallas Spirit, gave birth to a son, named Bill, on October 12, 1927.

== Race summary ==
Dole Air Race
Notes: PN-9 refers to the unsuccessful 1925 Navy attempt; Bird of Paradise is the successful June 1927 Maitland/Hegenberger flight; City of Oakland is misspelled as Spirit and refers to the July 1927 Smith/Bronte flight and crash landing; Miss Doran is misspelled as Dorian
Aircraft				Start		Pilot	Navigator	Livery	Finish	Notes	Ref.
Make & Model	Name	Registration	Image	Draw	Launch	Pilot	Navigator	Livery	Finish	Notes	Ref.
Travel Air 5000	Oklahoma	NX911		1	1	Bennett Griffin	Al Henley	Blue with yellow wings	DNS	Forced to return after 30 minutes with fuselage issues.	
Goddard Special	El Encanto	NX5074		2	2	Norman A. Goddard	Kenneth C. Hawkins	Silver	DNS	Wrecked on takeoff.	
Breese-Wilde Model 5	Pabco Pacific Flyer	NX646		7	3	Livingston Gilson Irving		Orange and black	DNS	Wrecked after two attempts to take off.	
Lockheed Vega	Golden Eagle	NX913		15	4	Jack Frost	Gordon Scott	Gold with blue landing gear.	DNF	Sponsored by George Randolph Hearst, publisher of the San Francisco Examiner. Lost at sea.	
Buhl Airsedan	Miss Doran	NX2915		4	5	Auggie Pedlar	Lt. V. R. Knope	Red wings, white fuselage, blue tail	DNF	Mildred Doran, namesake, was a passenger. Turned back after 14 minutes due to engine backfire; successfully took off on second attempt. Lost at sea.	
Breese-Wilde Model 5	Aloha	NX914		11	6	Martin Jensen	Paul Schluter	Lemon yellow with pink lei	2		
Travel Air 5000	Woolaroc	NX869		9	7	Arthur Goebel	William V. Davis	Yellow and blue	1	Finished with 1 1/2 US pints (0.71 L) of gas. Name originated from the "woods, lakes, and rocks" on the lands of the corporate sponsor, Phillips Petroleum.	
Swallow Monoplane	Dallas Spirit	NX941		5	8	William Portwood Erwin	Alvin Eichwaldt	Green	DNS	Originally to be navigated by Erwin's wife, Constance. Forced to return with engine trouble. Lost at sea while searching for missing Miss Doran and Golden Eagle.	
Entrants that withdrew, crashed, or disqualified prior to race start
Aircraft				Start		Pilot	Navigator	Livery	Finish	Notes	Ref.
Make & Model	Name	Registration	Image	Draw	Launch	Pilot	Navigator	Livery	Finish	Notes	Ref.
Air King biplane	City of Peoria	NX3070		3	—	Charles Parkhurst	Ralph Lowes	Silver	DQ	Disqualified for inadequate fuel capacity. Alternate pilots Dick Grace or Ernest Smith; Smith was the first civilian to fly nonstop to Hawaii, crashing on Molokai in City of Oakland.	
Hess Bluebird	Wanda	NX1445		6	—	Frederick A. Giles			DQ	Unable to meet qualification deadline of 10 AM on August 15. Attempted flight to Australia via Honolulu in November 1927; landed at San Simeon instead.	
International CF-10	Pride of Los Angeles			8	—	James L. Giffin	Theodore S. Lundgren		X	Crashed into San Francisco Bay on approach to Oakland August 11, both survived.	
—	—	—		10	—	Robert C. Fowler			WD	Unable to purchase plane; withdrew.	
International F-17W biplane	Miss Hollydale	NX912		12	—	Frank L. Clarke	Jeff Warren		WD	Announced withdrawal and left abruptly on Aug 13.	
Tremaine Hummingbird	Spirit of John Rodgers			13	—	George D. Covell	Richard S. Waggener		X	Original navigator L.P. Pawlikowski withdrew Aug 8 with illness. Crashed at Point Loma enroute to start of race on August 10. No survivors.	
Bryant Monoplane	Angel of Los Angeles	NX705		14	—	Arthur V. Rogers			X	Crashed during test flight at Western Air Express Field (Montebello) on August 12. No survivors.	

== See also ==
- List of aviation awards
