= Dallas Spirit =

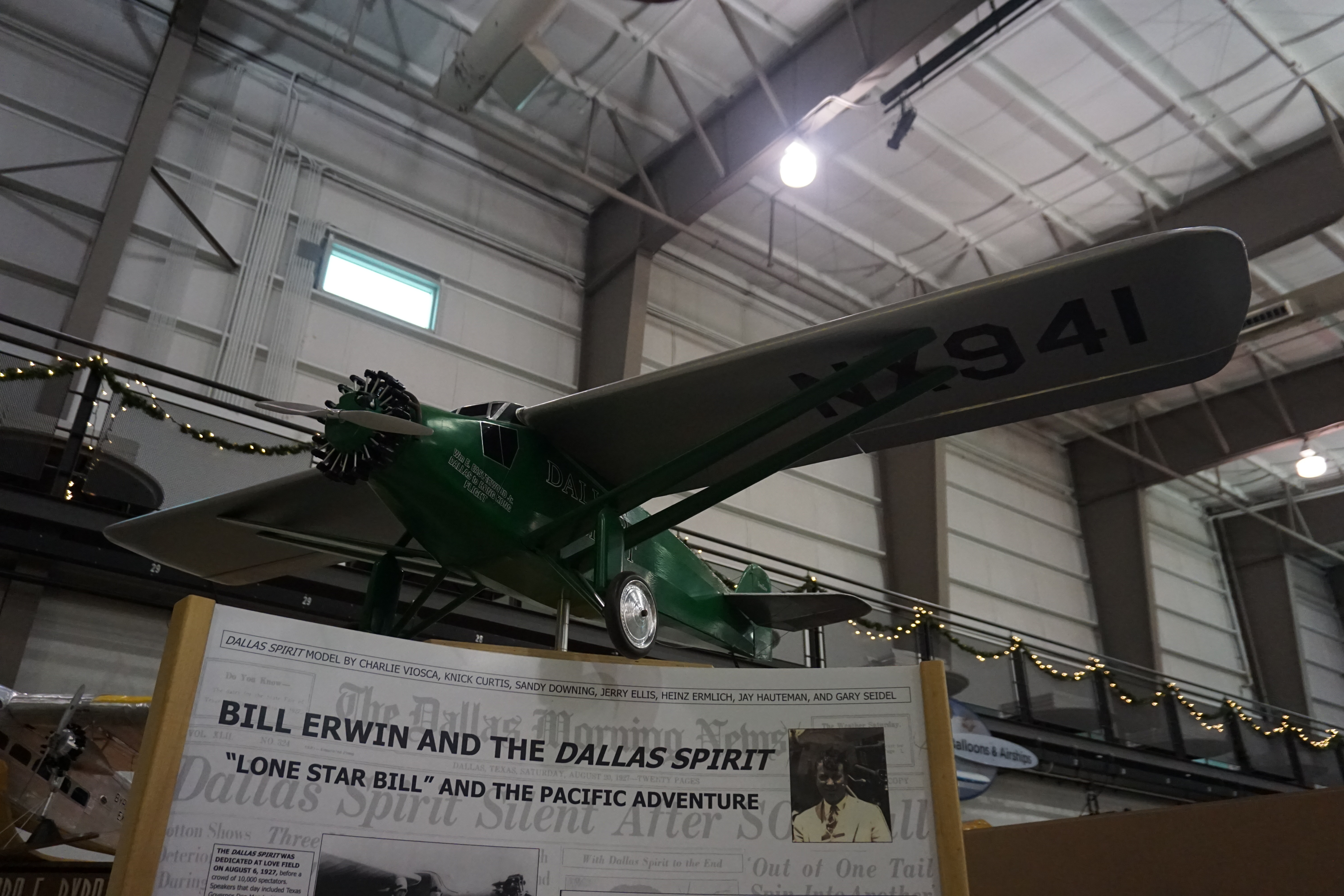
- A Dallas Spirit model on display at the Frontiers of Flight Museum

General information
- Type: Monoplane
- National origin: United States of America
- Manufacturer: Swallow Airplane Company

History
- First flight: 1927

Dallas Spirit, (aka Swallow Monoplane or Swallow Dole Racer), was a custom-built aircraft designed to compete in the ill-fated Dole Air Derby between California and Hawaii.

== Development ==
Dallas Spirit was built to attempt to win back to back two aviation prizes offered at the peak of record-setting aviation accomplishments in 1927. The first was to win the $25,000 Dole Air Derby between Oakland, California and Honolulu, Hawaii. The second was to win the $25,000 prize for a flight between Dallas and Hong Kong sponsored by William E. Easterwood. Dallas Spirit was built at the Swallow factory at 2401 North Hillside, in Wichita, Kansas.

== Design ==
Dallas Spirit was a high-wing monoplane with conventional landing gear. The dual wingstruts featured large airfoil shaped fairings. It was painted green and silver.

== Operational history ==
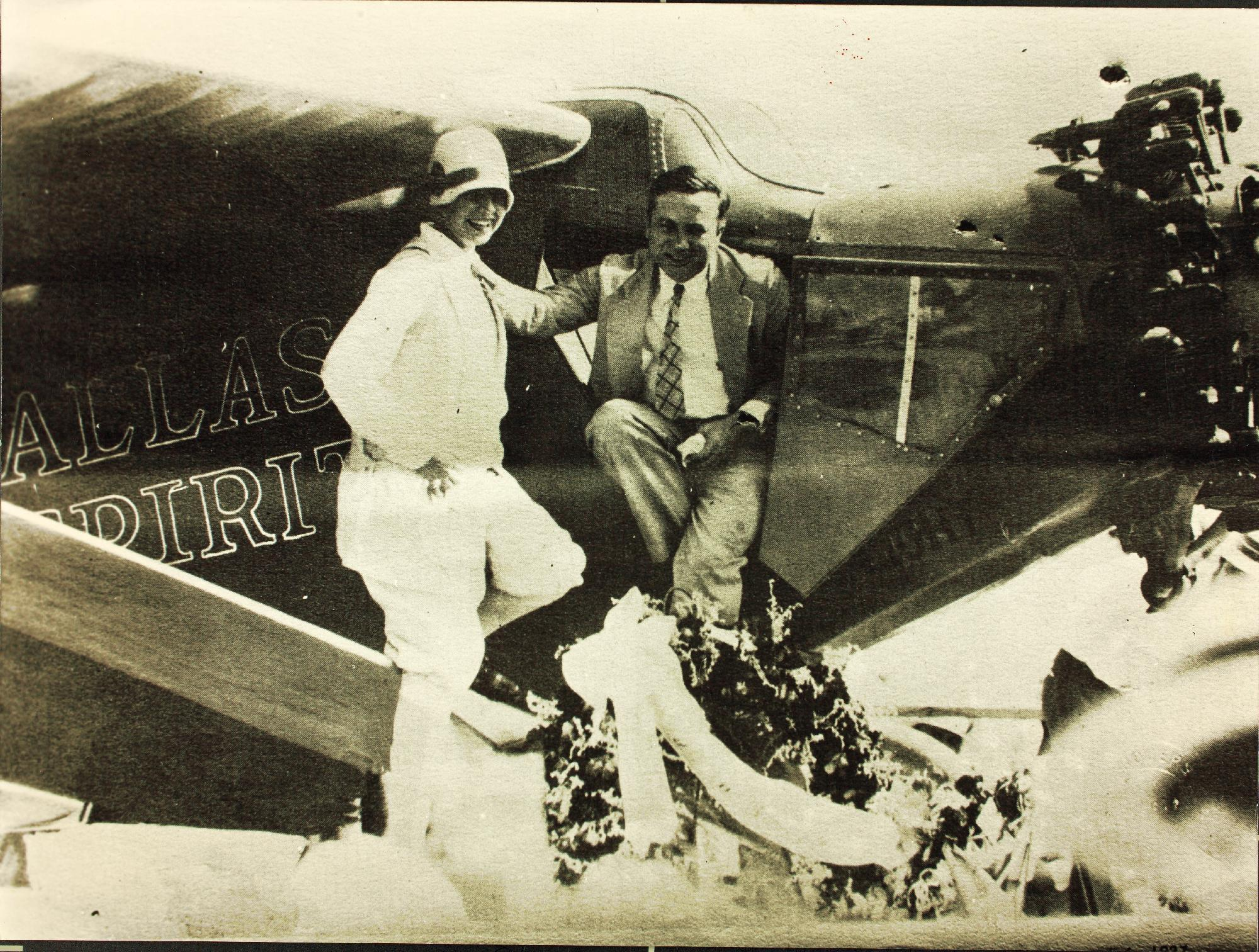
Dallas Spirit, with Captain Bill Erwin and his wife, Constance (1927)

Dallas Spirit was unveiled at Love Field in Dallas, Texas on 6 August 1927. It was intended to bring as much publicity to the city as the Spirit of St. Louis did earlier in the year with Charles Lindbergh's solo transatlantic crossing.

=== The Dole Air Race ===
The scheduled departure date was 16 August 1927. Dallas Spirit was flown by 31-year-old William Portwood Erwin and navigated by 27-year-old Alvin Eichwaldt. Before the race started, two planes had already crashed, killing all their occupants. Most competitors barely could take off, and had mishaps, or turned back just after departure. Dallas Spirit was one of these unlucky entrants, returning shortly after the first attempt with six feet of fabric torn from the side, blamed on a misaligned access panel under the navigator. Of the four aircraft that continued, two aircraft reported landings in Hawaii, and two disappeared: Miss Doran and Golden Eagle. Dole and William F. Mallosa, who had backed Miss Doran, put a combined $50,000 in rewards together to find the missing pilots.

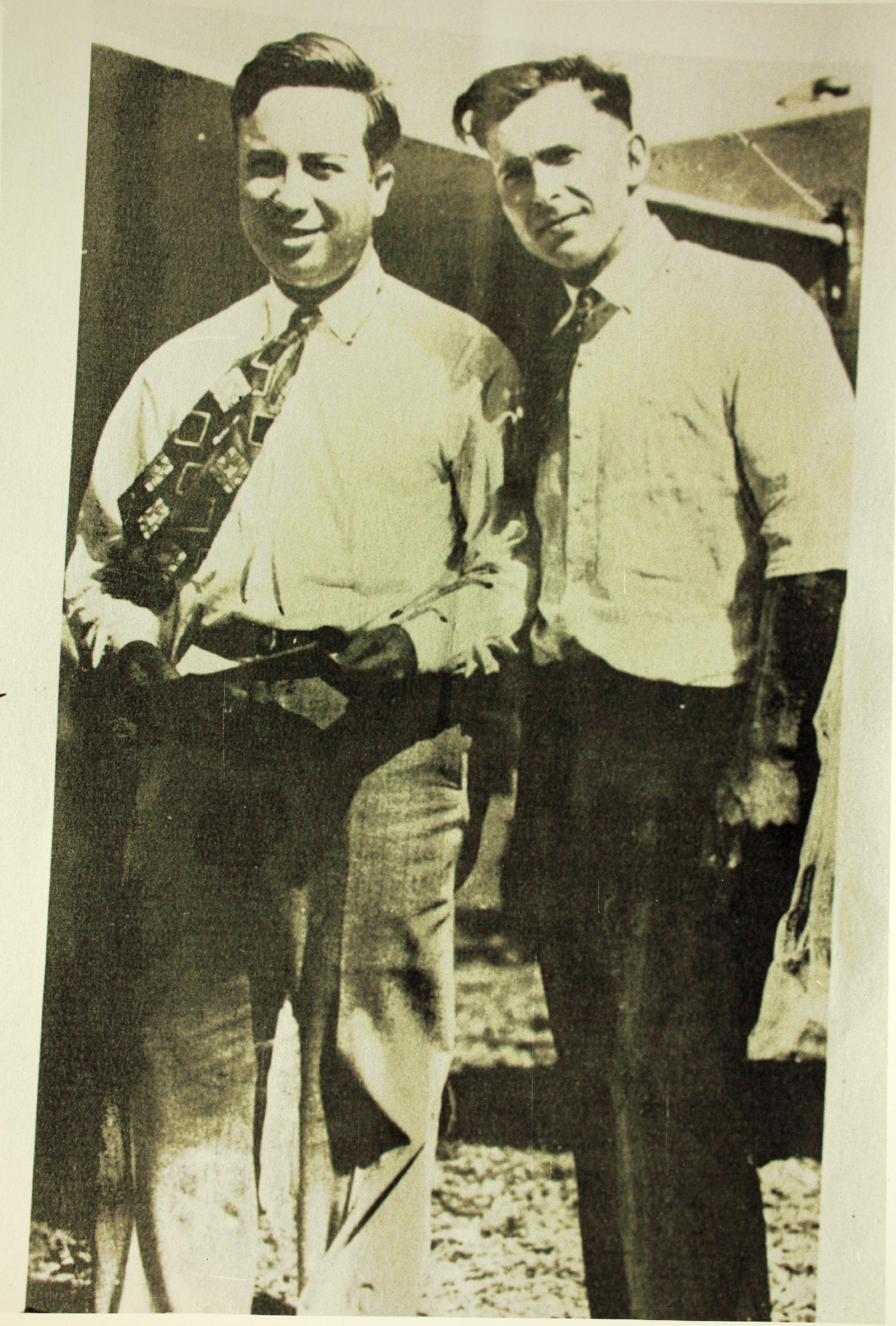
Erwin and Eichwaldt (1927)

Repairs to the tail section of the Dallas Spirit tail section took two days. On 18 August, Erwin decided to attempt the California to Hawaii trip without the prize, searching for the missing aircraft Miss Doran and Golden Eagle, then continuing on to Manila and Hong Kong. A 55-watt short wave radio was removed from another contestant, the Pabco Flyer and installed in the Dallas Spirit. Amateur radio operators across the country monitored the transmissions on the 33.1-meter wavelength. At 9 pm, Eichwald sent a message that the aircraft went into a spin and recovered, followed by a second S.O.S. that the plane had gone into a spin. The abrupt signal loss in the middle of the call occurred as the plane crashed into the ocean about 650 miles west of Oakland.

On 27 October 1927, a silver piece of aileron was found washed ashore at Redondo Beach, California, which was thought to have come from the lost ship. "Discovery of a number, 43449-10, stamped in indelible ink upon two wooden inner ribs, upon the wing, lent hope that it might be possible to trace it to its origin. The fragment was taken to the biology laboratory at the University of Southern California, to determine how long it was in the water." A check of records indicated that the missing aircraft had silver elevators while the rest of the ship was green.

Dallas Spirit was built on credit with the promise of the Swallow Airplane Company receiving some of the prize money. The disappearance of the plane was enough to send the company into receivership. Owner Mollendick sold off his interests to aviation investor Victor Roos.

== Specifications (Dallas Spirit) ==
Data from aerofiles

General characteristics

- Capacity: 2
- Wingspan: 48 ft (15 m)
- Powerplant: 1 × Wright J-5 Whirlwind , 225 hp (168 kW)

Performance

- Maximum speed: 109 kn (126 mph, 203 km/h)
- Cruise speed: 91 kn (105 mph, 169 km/h)
- Stall speed: 39 kn (45 mph, 72 km/h)

Avionics
55w wind driven radio

== See also ==
- Image of Dallas Spirit
- Oakland Tribune image of the Dallas Spirit in flight.
- Radio donated by Livingston Gilson Irving to Erwin
