= William V. Davis =

US Navy admiral (1902-1981)

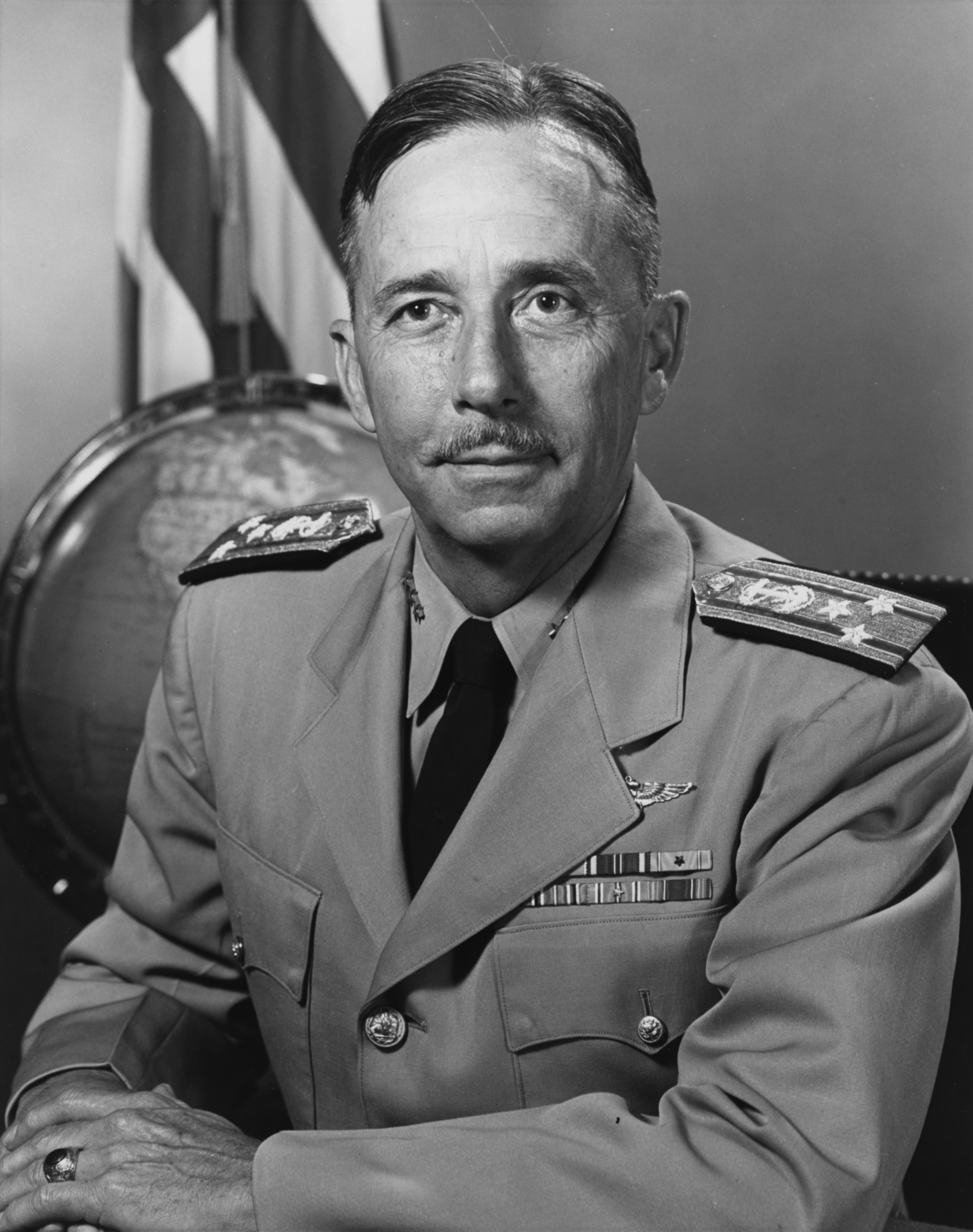
- Born: William Virginius Davis Jr. January 28, 1902; Savannah, Georgia, U.S.
- Died: July 25, 1981 (aged 79); Mobile, Alabama
- Spouse: Margaret Cary
- Military career
- Allegiance: United States
- Branch: United States Navy
- Service years: 1924–60 (36 years)
- Rank: Vice admiral
- Nickname: Bill
- Commands: USS Tulagi; USS Franklin D. Roosevelt; Naval Air Station Patuxent River; Carrier Division 5, 7th Fleet; Deputy Commander in Chief, US Atlantic Fleet
- Conflicts: World War II; Cold War
- Awards: see below

William Virginius Davis Jr. (January 28, 1902 – July 25, 1981) was a vice admiral in the United States Navy.

== Early life ==
William V. Davis Jr. was one of four children of the marriage of William V. Davis, Sr. and Winifred Bonney, of Savannah, Georgia. He had an older brother Thomas, and two younger brothers Fredrick and Walton. Thomas was a chemical engineer, Frederick was a lawyer with a practice in Savannah, and Walton was a priest in the Episcopal church. Winifred Bonney was Davis Sr.'s second wife, his first wife having died, leaving a daughter, Wyche. As a child, William V. Davis Jr. attended public school in Savannah.

== Military career ==
=== Pre War ===
William V. Davis Jr. entered the United States Naval Academy from the First Congressional District of Georgia on August 5, 1920. He graduated and was commissioned ensign on June 5, 1924. As a midshipman he participated in swimming and lacrosse.

His first assignment as ensign was the USS Idaho. He served on the battleship until January 1926, when he requested a reassignment to the Naval Air Station Pensacola for flight training. Upon completion he was awarded the designation of United States Naval Aviator in January 1927. He was then assigned to duty with Aircraft Squadrons Battle Fleet - Fighter Squadron 6 and Bombing Squadron 2 attached to the USS Langley, and later to the USS Saratoga until June 1929.

In July 1929 he was assigned to duty as flight instructor at the Naval Air Station Pensacola until June 1932. He then returned to the USS Saratoga, this time as Landing Signal Officer. Except for two years when stationed at the Naval Air Station Anacostia as Flight Test Officer, he served at sea from June 1932 until June 1941 with aircraft squadrons of the Pacific Fleet aboard the USS Saratoga, USS Concord, USS Idaho, and the last year of this period as Commander of Torpedo Squadron 5, aboard the USS Yorktown.

=== World War II ===
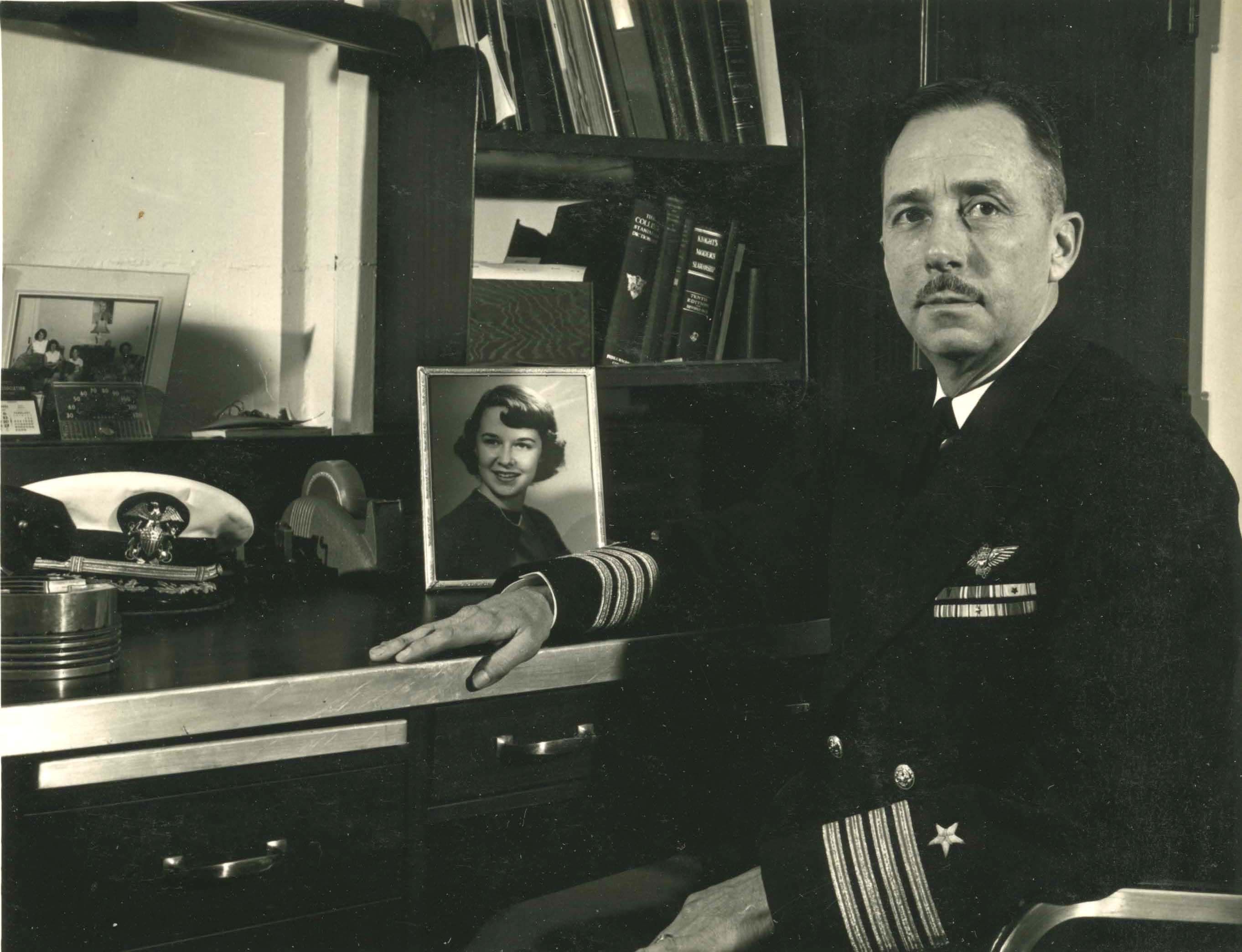
Captain William V. Davis Jr. in his quarters on board the USS Franklin D. Roosevelt. Naval Aviator insignia is above campaign ribbons.

In June 1941, he was ordered to the Naval Air Station Norfolk, Virginia, to establish the Aircraft Armament Unit, and served as officer in /charge of that unit until July 1943. He was promoted to captain in May 1943 and in August he was transferred to duty with the Air Force, Pacific Fleet and in October 1943 was appointed Chief of Staff of Commander Aircraft, Central Pacific Force. From May until December 1944, he served as deputy chief of staff for operations to Commander Shore-Based Air Force, Forward Area, Central Pacific; and as Chief of Staff, Headquarters Strategic Air Force, Pacific Ocean Areas from December 1944 until January 1945. For outstanding service in those assignments, he was awarded the Legion of Merit by Adm. Chester Nimitz. The citation following in part:

"For exceptionally meritorious conduct...during operations against enemy Japanese forces in the Pacific War Area from May 1, 1944 to January 19, 1945... (He) successfully organized the section of his command and performed operations of vital importance and as Chief of Staff, was in large measure responsible for the efficiency of the strategic air force. In addition he carried out his duties as Air Liaison Officer of Saipan, directing and coordinating all shore-based aircraft of his command throughout the Saipan-Tinian Campaign... (and) contributed to the success of our operations..."

In May 1945, Davis assumed command of the USS Tulagi which was supporting operations at Okinawa. The carrier was frequently the target of air attacks by Japanese forces.

=== Post war ===
When detached from that command, he was ordered in January 1946 to duty as Project Coordinator Operational Development Force, Atlantic Fleet, commanded by Admiral R.P. Briscoe, based at Norfolk, Virginia. In April 1947 Capt. Davis was named Director of Flight Tests at the Naval Air Station Patuxent River. It was one of his longest assignments, three years, until July 1950, when he was ordered to the aircraft carrier USS Franklin D. Roosevelt as its commanding officer until July 1951.

Returning to the Naval Air Station Patuxent River in August 1951, he commanded that activity until January 1952, when he was ordered to report for duty in the Office of the Chief of Naval Operations, Navy Department. In April 1952, he became Navy Deputy Commander, Field Command, Armed Forces Special Weapons Project, Albuquerque, New Mexico, and from February 1955 until February 1956, he commanded Carrier Division Five in both eastern and western Pacific waters. He served as Assistant Chief of Naval Operations (Fleet Readiness) Navy Department, until July 1956, when he was ordered to duty as Deputy Chief of Naval Operations (Air) and promoted to vice admiral August 1, 1956. In May 1958, he was appointed Deputy Commander in Chief, U.S. Atlantic Fleet, where he served until his retirement from active duty on April 1, 1960.

== Aviation ==
=== Dole Air Race ===
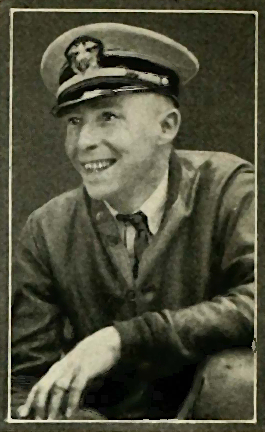
William Davis navigator, Dole Air Race, from Aero Digest, 1927

In August 1927, Davis participated in the Dole Air Race, a contest set up by businessman James Dole for flyers to compete to make the best time across the Pacific to Honolulu, Hawaii from Oakland, California. Charles Lindbergh's flight earlier that year was an easier navigational task; drifting north crosses England, drifting south crosses Spain. On this flight, any errors in navigation would result in open ocean. Making the trip in a single engine aircraft named the "WOOLAROC", the two man crew was Arthur C. Goebel, pilot, and Davis, navigator. The two airmen won the contest, completing the trip in 26 hours and 17 minutes. Of the eight aircraft starting the race, only four proceeded to cross the Pacific Ocean, and two ever made it to Hawaii. With such a result, the event garnered worldwide frontpage headlines. The Navy recognized Davis for this effort, and he was awarded the Distinguished Flying Cross by Rear Admiral A. W. Marshall. The citation read as follows:

"For extraordinary achievement in aerial flight and in recognition of his courage, skill and resourcefulness as navigator of the airplane WOOLAROC which won the Dole Air Race from San Francisco to Honolulu on August 16, 1927. He took part in this hazardous undertaking voluntarily in the interest of the development of aerial navigation and by his signal achievement became the first Naval Officer to reach the Hawaiian Islands from the mainland by air."

=== The Three SeaHawks ===
Formed by Lt. Daniel W. 'Tommy' Tomlinson, the Navy's first aerobatic stunt team came together in late 1927.
The aerial stunt team consisted of Lt. Tomlinson, Ltjg. William V. Davis and Ltjg. A. P. Storrs III. The stunt team performed its first demonstration in January 1928, flying three Boeing F2B-1 and F2B-2 fighters in San Francisco. They soon received an official name of the "Three Sea Hawks". Under this name, their first public performances were from 8–16 September 1928, during the National Air Races week at Mines Field (now Los Angeles International Airport).

=== Flight instructor ===
After leaving the USS Saratoga in July 1929, Lt. Davis was assigned to duty as flight instructor at the Naval Air Station Pensacola. He spent several years at NAS Pensacola training new pilots until June 1932, when he returned to the USS Saratoga.

=== Navy test pilot ===
In August 1949, while Director of Flight Test at Naval Air Station Patuxent River, Capt. Davis became the second naval aviator to fly faster than the speed of sound aboard the Douglas D-558-2 Skyrocket.

== Decorations and awards ==
Naval Aviator
Legion of Merit
Distinguished Flying Cross
American Defense Service Medal with Fleet Clasp
American Campaign Medal
Asiatic-Pacific Campaign Medal
World War II Victory Medal
Navy Occupation Service Medal with Europe and Asia Clasps
National Defense Service Medal
Order of the Crown of Thailand - Knight Grand Cross (First Class)

=== Honors ===
In October 1967 Vice Admiral Davis was awarded The Most Noble Order of the Crown of Thailand, Knight Grand Cross (First Class) by the government of Thailand.
The award took place on board the USS Alabama at Battleship Memorial Park in Mobile, Alabama. On behalf of the Royal Thai Navy, Group Captain Lek Mahanond presented the medal, accompanied by Group Captain Maharagkaga and Wing Commander Phallop Prompraky of the Royal Thai Air Force.

Davis is an honorary member of the Institute of Aeronautical Sciences, and an honorary Fellow of the Society of Experimental Test Pilots He received the National Air Council award for his work in high altitude jet flight, and development work in helicopters.

== Personal life ==
Davis married Margaret Cary of Pensacola, Florida, and they had four children.

Following his retirement from active duty in June 1960, he was employed by the Lockheed Aircraft Corporation as Military Advisor (Navy) in Burbank, Ca.

In November 1964 he was appointed Executive Director of the newly formed USS Alabama Battleship Commission, to oversee operations of the USS Alabama Battleship Memorial Park for the USS Alabama. He held that position until September 1972. He became Naval and Military Consultant on October 1, 1972. He retired from this assignment on September 30, 1974.
