= William Portwood Erwin =

American flying ace

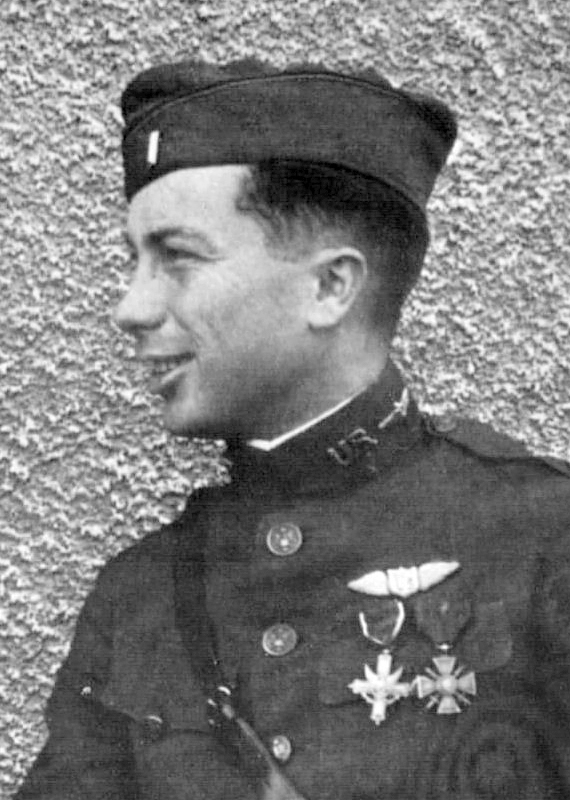
- William Portwood Erwin in 1918
- Born: October 18, 1895; Ryan, Oklahoma, USA
- Disappeared: August 19, 1927 (aged 31) (disappeared)
- Died: Pacific Ocean
- Spouse: Constance Ohl Erwin
- Military career
- Allegiance: United States
- Branch: Air Service, United States Army
- Rank: Lieutenant
- Nickname: Lone Star Bill
- Unit: Air Service, United States Army: 1st Aero Squadron
- Conflicts: World War I
- Awards: Distinguished Service Cross, French Croix de Guerre

Lieutenant William Portwood Erwin (18 October 1895 – 19 August 1927) was an American World War I flying ace credited with eight aerial victories. On 19 August 1927, he disappeared during the Dole Air Race from Oakland, California to Hawaii.

== Early life ==
William Portwood Erwin was the son of W. A. Erwin of Chicago. The younger Erwin, born elsewhere, was raised primarily in Chicago. Two sources claim he was born in Amarillo, Texas.

== World War I ==
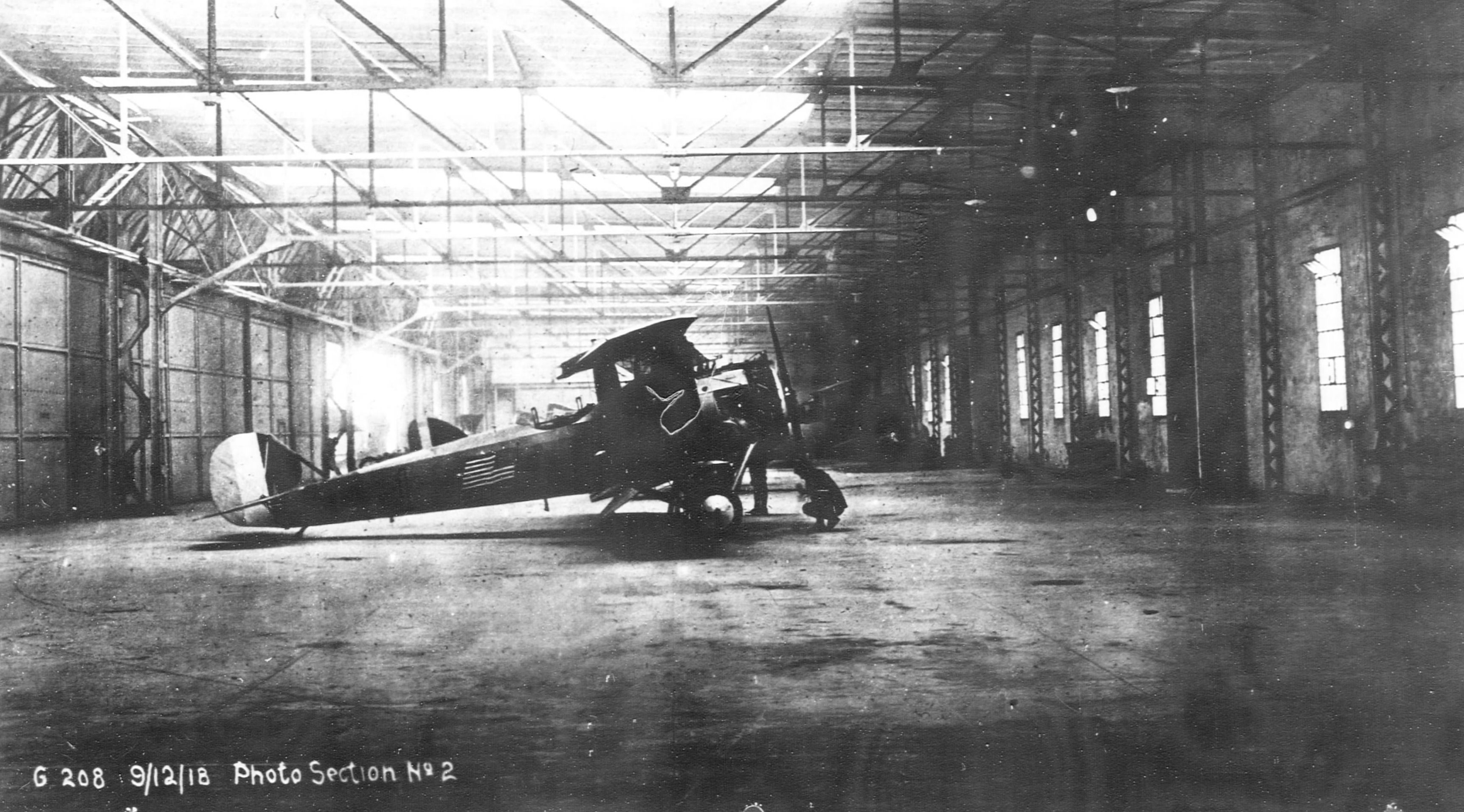
1st Aero Squadron Salmson 2A2 in a hangar in France.

Erwin was assigned to the 1st Aero Squadron on 19 July 1918. As a Salmson 2A2 pilot, he scored his victories between 15 September and 22 October 1918; half of them were with gunner Arthur Easterbrook.

== Postwar ==
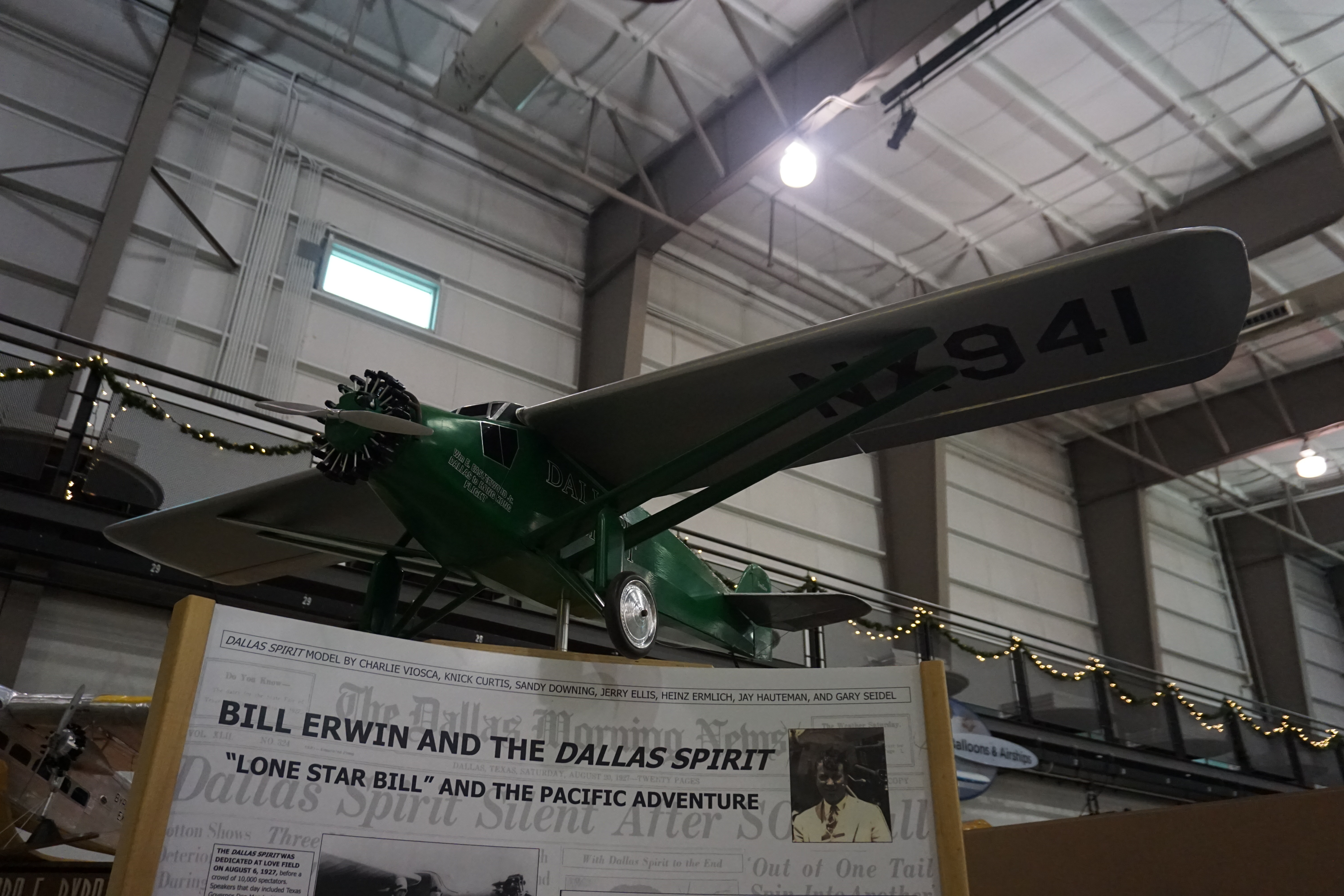
A Frontiers of Flight Museum display replica of the Dallas Spirit.

After the war, Erwin moved to Dallas where he operated a flying school. In Texas, he met his wife, Constance Ohl.

=== Dole Air Race ===
In 1927, Erwin and his wife planned a flight from Texas to Hong Kong. Along the way, they entered the Dole Air Race, which would be the first air race from California to Hawaii. Constance was later disqualified from participating in the air race due to her age, at 20 years old.

Erwin selected Alvin Eichwaldt as navigator for the Dole Race. Erwin and Eichwaldt would fly the Dallas Spirit, a custom aircraft built by the Swallow Airplane Company on credit for the attempt. Erwin and Eichwaldt's air race attempt was aborted shortly after takeoff due to mechanical problems. After returning to the airport to have the problems fixed, Erwin got word that two competitors' planes had gone missing during the attempt. Erwin and Eichwaldt and the Dallas Spirit went to search for the missing planes. Erwin failed to return from a search for two other missing competitors, the Miss Doran and The Golden Eagle, and is presumed drowned 19 August 1927.

== See also ==
- List of people who disappeared mysteriously at sea
- List of World War I flying aces from the United States

== Bibliography ==
- American Aces of World War 1 Harry Dempsey. Osprey Publishing, 2001. ISBN 1-84176-375-6, ISBN 978-1-84176-375-0.
- Over the Front: A Complete Record of the Fighter Aces and Units of the United States and French Air Services, 1914–1918 Norman L. R. Franks, Frank W. Bailey. Grub Street, 1992. ISBN 0-948817-54-2, ISBN 978-0-948817-54-0.
