= Lockheed R6V Constitution =

Transport aircraft

R6V Constitution
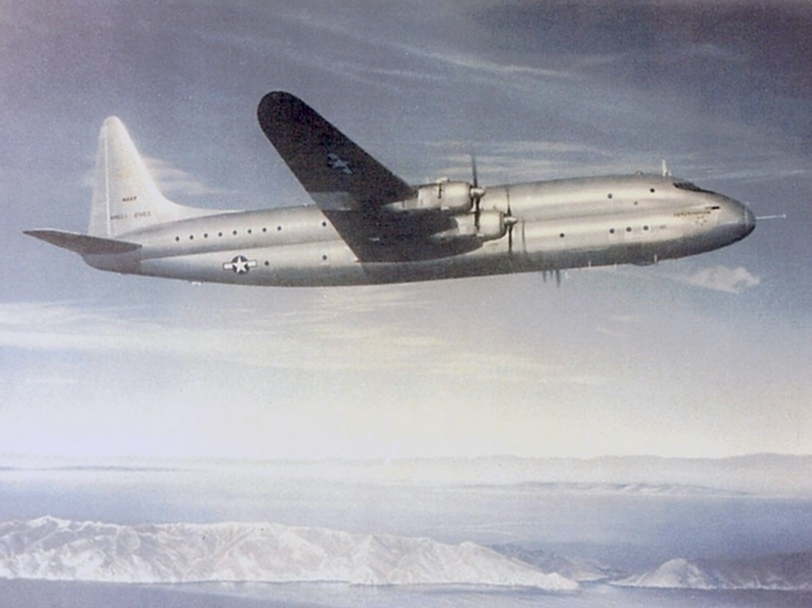
- The first XR6O-1 Constitution in flight

General information
- Type: Transport aircraft
- Manufacturer: Lockheed
- Status: Scrapped
- Primary user: U.S. Navy
- Number built: 2

History
- First flight: 9 November 1946

The Lockheed R6V Constitution (Note: The Constitutions were identified as R6O until 1950.) was a large, propeller-driven, double-decker transport aircraft developed in the 1940s by Lockheed as a long-range, high-capacity transport and airliner for the U.S. Navy and Pan American Airways. Only two of the aircraft were ever built, both prototypes. Although these two planes went into service with the Navy, the Constitution design ultimately proved underpowered and too large for practical airline use at the time. Although the Martin JRM Mars flying boat had a slightly longer wingspan, the Constitution remains the largest fixed-wing aircraft type ever operated by the U.S. Navy.

== Design and development ==
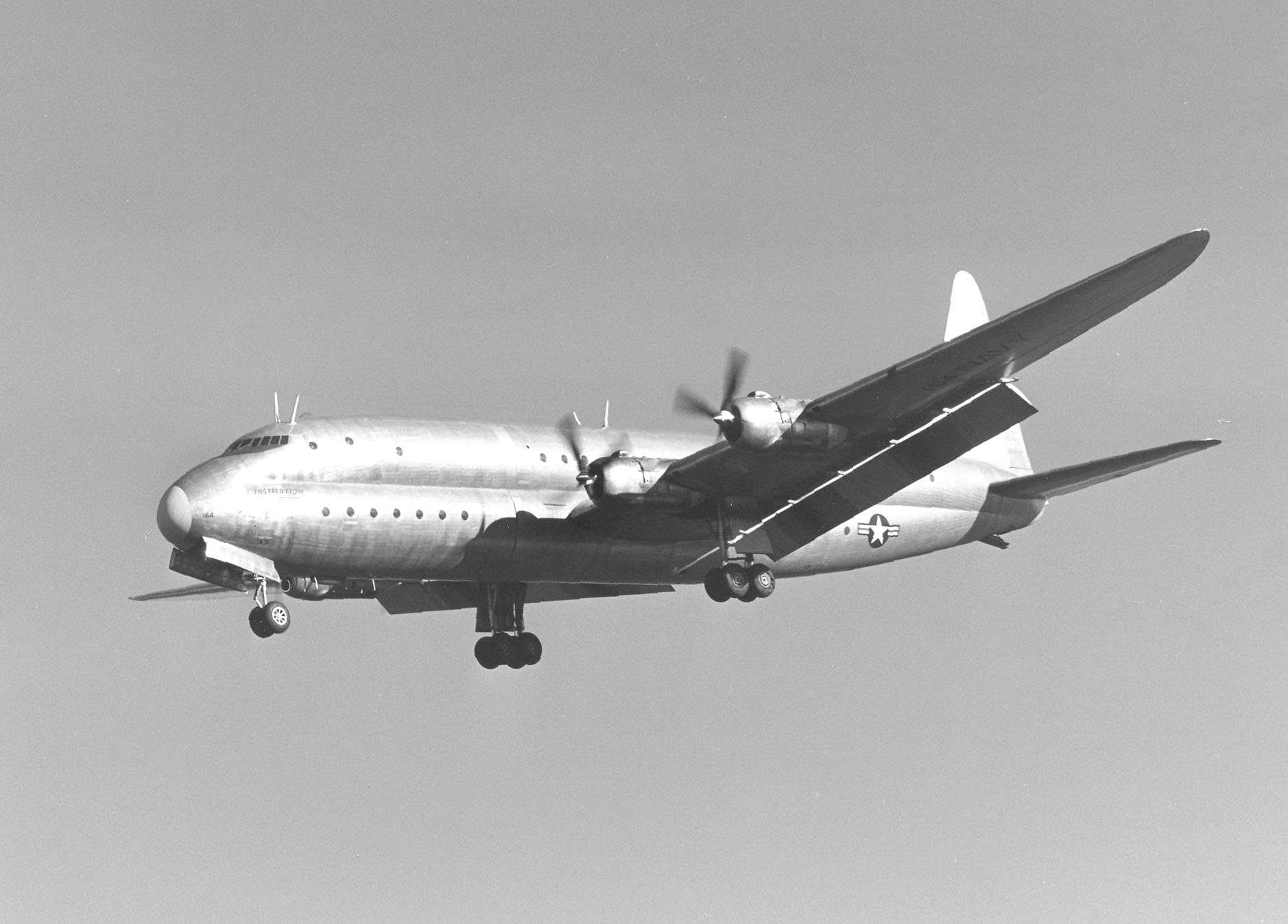
The XR6O-1 Constitution landing at NAS Moffett Field.

The Lockheed Constitution began life in 1942 as a joint study by the U.S. Navy, Pan Am, and Lockheed. The design requirements, initially designated Lockheed Model 89, called for a large transport aircraft to improve upon the Navy's fleet of flying boats. Pan Am was involved in the study because such an aircraft had potential use as a commercial airliner. This transport would carry 17,500 lb (7,900 kg) of cargo 5,000 miles (8,000 km) at a cruising altitude of 25,000 feet (7,600 m) and a speed greater than 250 mph (400 km/h). The aircraft would be fully pressurized and large enough so that most major components could be accessed and possibly repaired in flight. For instance, tunnels led through the thick wings to all four engines.

The aircraft was designed by a team of engineers led by Willis Hawkins and W.A. Pulver of Lockheed and Commander E. L. Simpson, Jr. of the Navy. The name Constitution was given to the project by Lockheed president Robert E. Gross.

The Constitution design had a "double bubble" fuselage, the cross section of which was a "figure eight". This unorthodox design, originally created in 1937 by Curtiss-Wright's chief aircraft designer George A. Page Jr. and first introduced with the Curtiss C-46 Commando, utilized the structural advantages of a cylinder for cabin pressurization, without the wasted space that would result from a single large cylinder of the same volume.

The original contract from the Bureau of Aeronautics called for 50 Constitutions for a total price tag of $111,250,000. On VJ Day, however, the contract was scaled back to $27,000,000 for only two aircraft.

== Operational history ==
=== Ship No. 1 ===
1946 newsreel

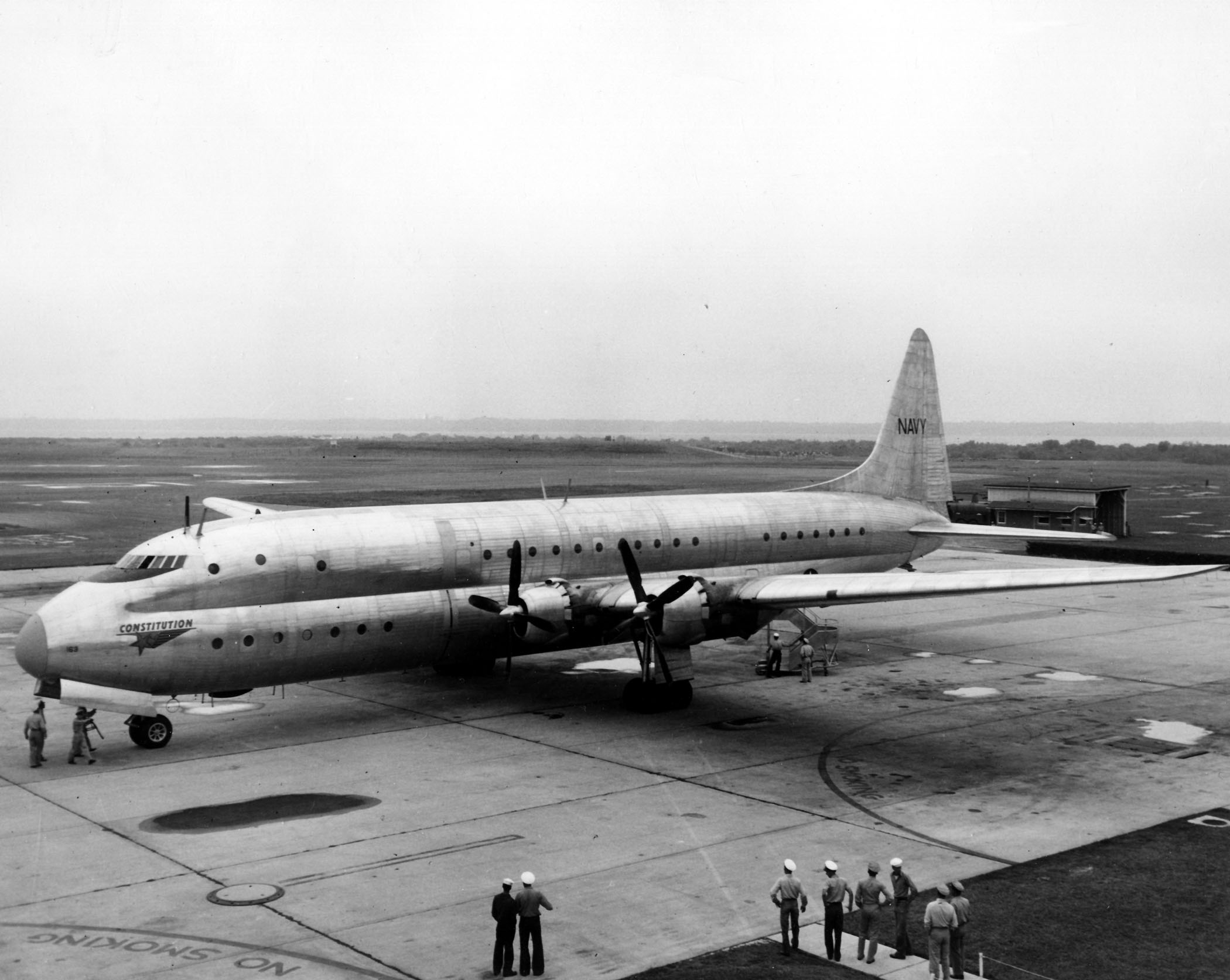
BuNo. 85163 at NAS Jacksonville in 1949

The first Constitution, BuNo 85163, was built in the summer of 1946 at the Lockheed plant in Burbank, California. Due to the aircraft's large size—the tail towered 50 feet (15 m)—Lockheed had to build a special hangar for final assembly. The hangar, Lockheed-California's Building 309, measured 408 ft (124 m) long, 302 ft (92 m) wide, and the equivalent of six stories tall. The footprint of the hangar covered 4 acres (16,000 m^{2}). It cost $1,250,000.

The R6O made its first flight on 9 November 1946, powered by interim 3,000 hp R-4360-18 radials. Joe Towle and Tony LeVier flew the aircraft on a leisurely course to Muroc Air Force Base. Once there, the aircraft underwent a carefully documented test program. At this time, electronic data recording technology was not well developed, so instrument readings were recorded by a movie camera pointed at the instrument panel. Additional movie cameras were carried to record test results.

The first Constitution made a nonstop flight from NAS Moffett Field, California to NAS Patuxent River, Maryland on 25 July 1948, a distance of 2,460 mi (3,960 km). The pilot for the flight was Commander William Collins, USN and the copilots were Lieutenant Commander James W. Robinson, USN and Roy Wimmer, Lockheed engineering test pilot. Four days later, the ship was formally christened by Mrs. John L. Sullivan, wife of the Secretary of the Navy, at Washington National Airport. (Note: by daughter Marijane Robinson McBride who was at Lockheed the day actor Robert Montgomery gave the pilots a model of the USS Constitution sailing ship.)

The first test flights revealed that the aircraft was underpowered so the engines were changed for 3,500 hp (with water injection) R-4360-22-W engines. The R6O also tested assisted takeoffs with six rockets mounted on the wings near the fuselage. At full gross weight, the rockets shortened the takeoff run by 24%.

Ship No. 1 was delivered to Navy Transport Squadron 44 (VR-44), based at Naval Air Station Alameda, on 2 February 1949. Both it and its sister ship flew the route between California and Hawaii, approximately 2,390 mi (3,850 km).

=== Ship No. 2 ===
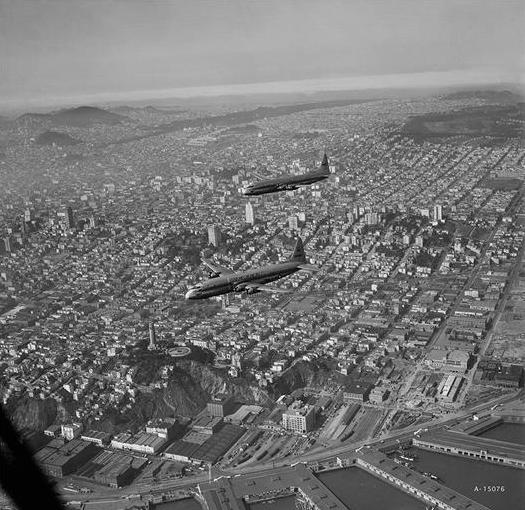
The two XR6V Constitutions in flight over San Francisco in 1950

The second Constitution, BuNo 85164, first flew on 9 June 1948, reaching 25,000 feet during a two-hour flight. Unlike Ship No. 1, the upper deck was fully furnished as a luxury passenger transport, with accommodations for 92 passengers and 12 crew. Accommodations on the upper deck of the first Constitution were decidedly more spartan. On the rear of the forward bulkhead, in front of the spiral staircase leading to the lower deck, there was a permanent display case containing a scale model of the original USS Constitution sailing ship.

The lower deck had 7,373 cubic feet (208.8 m^{3}) of cargo space, and it was loaded by an electrical hoist. The lower deck could also be converted to seat an additional 76 passengers.

The second Constitution, like its predecessor, also made a non-stop transcontinental flight. On 3 February 1949, the aircraft flew 74 members of the press from Moffett Field to Washington National Airport. At the time, this was the largest number of people flown across the United States in a single flight. This flight inaugurated six months of regular service between Washington, D.C. and San Francisco.

In 1949, Ship No. 2 made a Navy recruiting tour of 19 cities. The side of the fuselage proudly advertised "Your Navy—Air And Sea." Some 546,000 toured the aircraft's interior.

=== Final disposition ===
The Constitution had operational difficulties which prevented it from meeting its original design objectives. The large airframe needed more power than the four Pratt & Whitney R-4360s could deliver, and the engines had cooling problems. While this could be compensated for by flying with engine cowl flaps partially open, it increased drag and decreased range.

The Navy operated the two Constitutions through the end of the 1940s and into the 1950s. By 1949 the Navy announced that it could no longer afford to operate them, and offered them to airlines on a five-year lease. There was no interest from airlines in using the Constitutions (the airline version was named the Model 189), so the Navy retired both aircraft in 1953. They went into storage at NAS Litchfield Park, Arizona in 1955. Both aircraft and 13 spare engines were sold for $97,785. Lockheed proposed the Model 389 and Model 489 airliners based on the Constitution, which would have accommodated up to 169 passengers. Neither of these "paper" projects received much interest from civil operators.

The first Constitution was brought to Las Vegas, where it served as an enormous billboard for Alamo Airways, before being scrapped by Howard Hughes when he acquired the property. The second Constitution was flown to Opa-Locka Airport, Florida, where it was damaged by an internal fire, suspected by the authorities to be arson, while the aircraft was being prepared for a ferry flight to Barcelona. It remained stored at Opa-Locka in June 1970, but was eventually scrapped.

== Operators ==
United States

- United States Navy
  - VR-5
  - VR-44

== Specifications (R6V) ==
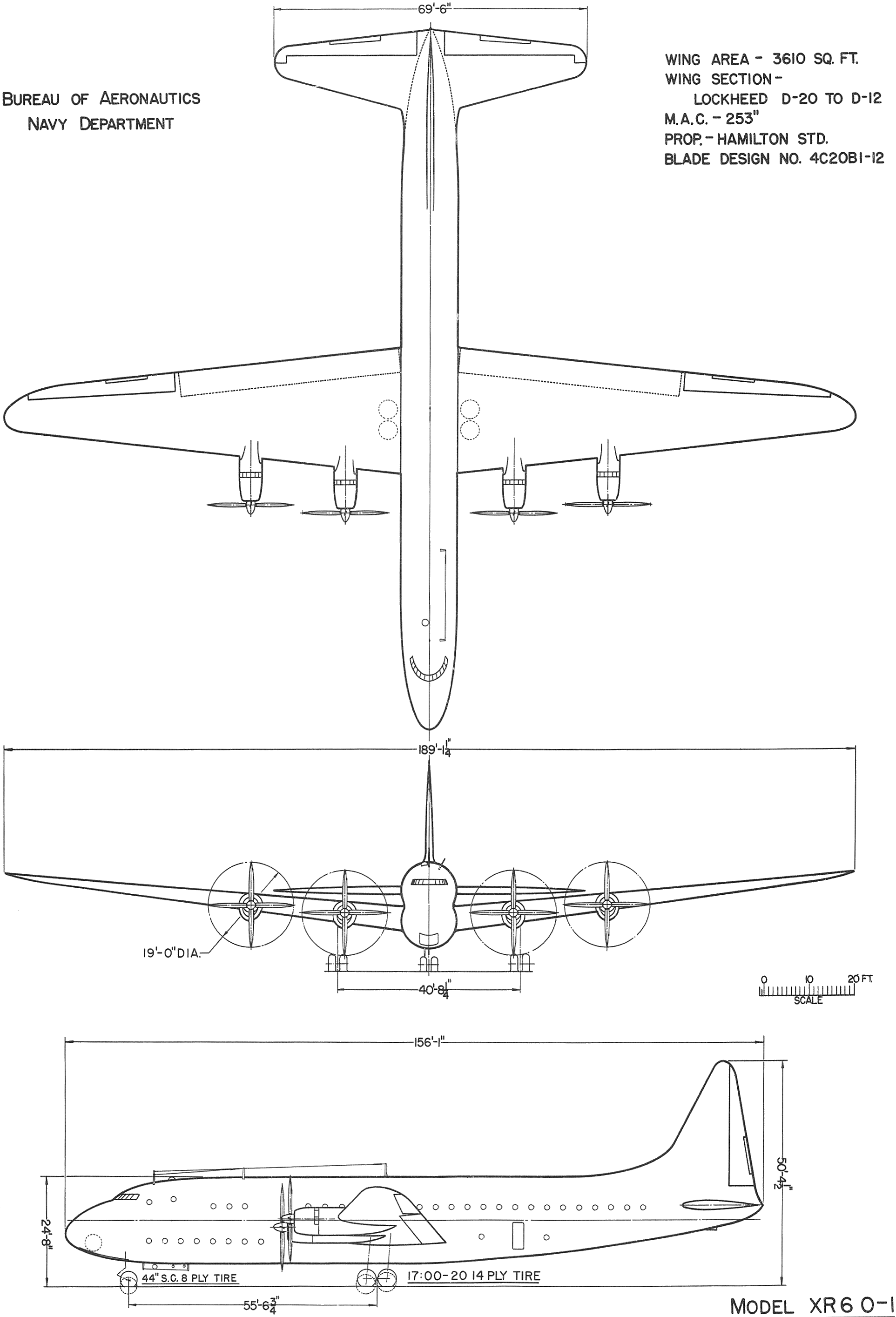
3-view line drawing of the Lockheed XR6O-1 Constitution

Data from Lockheed Aircraft since 1913

General characteristics

- Crew: 12
- Capacity: 168 passengers
- Length: 156 ft 1 in (47.57 m)
- Wingspan: 189 ft 1 1/4 in (57.64 m)
- Height: 50 ft 4 1/2 in (15.35 m)
- Wing area: 3,610 sq ft (335 m^{2})
- Empty weight: 114,575 lb (51,970 kg)
- Max takeoff weight: 184,000 lb (83,461 kg)
- Powerplant: 4 × Pratt & Whitney R-4360-22W radial engine, 3,500 hp (2,600 kW) each

Performance

- Maximum speed: 303 mph (490 km/h, 263 kn) at 20,000 ft (6,100 m)
- Cruise speed: 260 mph (420 km/h, 230 kn)
- Ferry range: 6,300 mi (10,100 km, 5,500 nmi)
- Service ceiling: 27,600 ft (8,400 m)
- Rate of climb: 1,010 ft/min (5.1 m/s)

== See also ==
Aircraft of comparable role, configuration, and era

- Bristol Brabazon – British propeller-driven large airliner prototype
- Convair XC-99 – American prototype cargo plane (1949–57)
- Saunders-Roe Princess – British 1952 airliner flying boat

Related lists

- List of United States Navy aircraft designations (pre-1962)
