= Lockheed Corporation =

American aerospace company (1926–1995)

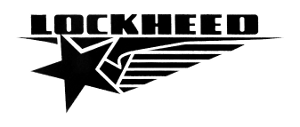
- Industry: Aerospace
- Founded: December 13, 1926; 99 years ago
- Founders: Allan Lockheed; Malcolm Lockheed
- Defunct: 1995
- Fate: Merged with Martin Marietta
- Successor: Lockheed Martin
- Headquarters: Calabasas, California, United States
- Key people: Irv Culver; Courtlandt S. Gross; Robert E. Gross; Willis Hawkins; Hall Hibbard; Kelly Johnson; Anthony LeVier; Joseph F. Ware Jr.
- Number of employees: 90,000

The Lockheed Corporation was an American aerospace manufacturer. Lockheed was founded in 1926 and merged in 1995 with Martin Marietta to form Lockheed Martin. Its founder, Allan Lockheed, had earlier founded the similarly named but otherwise-unrelated Loughead Aircraft Manufacturing Company, which was operational from 1912 to 1920.

== History ==
=== Origins ===
Allan Loughead and his brother Malcolm Loughead had operated an earlier aircraft company, Loughead Aircraft Manufacturing Company, which was operational from 1912 to 1920. The company built and operated aircraft for paying passengers on sightseeing tours in California and had developed a prototype for the civil market, but folded in 1920 due to the flood of surplus aircraft deflating the market after World War I. Allan went into the real estate market while Malcolm had meanwhile formed a successful company marketing brake systems for automobiles. On December 13, 1926, Allan Loughead, John Northrop, Kenneth Kay, and Fred Keeler secured funding to form the Lockheed Aircraft Company (spelled phonetically to prevent mispronunciation) in Hollywood. This new company used some of the same technology originally developed for the Model S-1 to design the Vega Model. In March 1928, the company relocated to Burbank, California, and by year's end reported sales exceeding one million dollars. From 1926 to 1928 the company produced over 80 aircraft and employed more than 300 workers who by April 1929 were building five aircraft per week. In July 1929, majority shareholder Fred Keeler sold 87% of the Lockheed Aircraft Company to Detroit Aircraft Corporation. In August 1929, Allan Loughead resigned.

The Great Depression ruined the aircraft market, and Detroit Aircraft went bankrupt. A group of investors headed by brothers Robert and Courtland Gross, and Walter Varney, bought the company out of receivership in 1932. The syndicate bought the company for a mere $40,000 ($858,000 in 2023). Ironically, Allan Loughead himself had planned to bid for his own company, but had raised only $50,000 ($1,072,000), which he felt was too small a sum for a serious bid.

In 1934, Robert E. Gross was named chairman of the new company, the Lockheed Aircraft Corporation, which was headquartered at what is now the airport in Burbank, California. His brother Courtlandt S. Gross was a co-founder and executive, succeeding Robert as chairman following his death in 1961. The company was named the Lockheed Corporation in 1977.

The first successful construction that was built in any number (141 aircraft) was the Vega first built in 1927, best known for its several first- and record-setting flights by, among others, Amelia Earhart, Wiley Post, and George Hubert Wilkins. In the 1930s, Lockheed spent $139,400 ($2.29 million) to develop the Model 10 Electra, a small twin-engined transport. The company sold 40 in the first year of production. Amelia Earhart and her navigator, Fred Noonan, flew it in their failed attempt to circumnavigate the world in 1937. Subsequent designs, the Lockheed Model 12 Electra Junior and the Lockheed Model 14 Super Electra expanded their market.

=== Prewar production ===
The Lockheed Model 14 formed the basis for the Hudson bomber, which was supplied to both the British Royal Air Force and the United States military before and during World War II. Its primary role was submarine hunting. The Model 14 Super Electra were sold abroad, and more than 100 were license-built in Japan for use by the Imperial Japanese Army.

=== Production during World War II ===
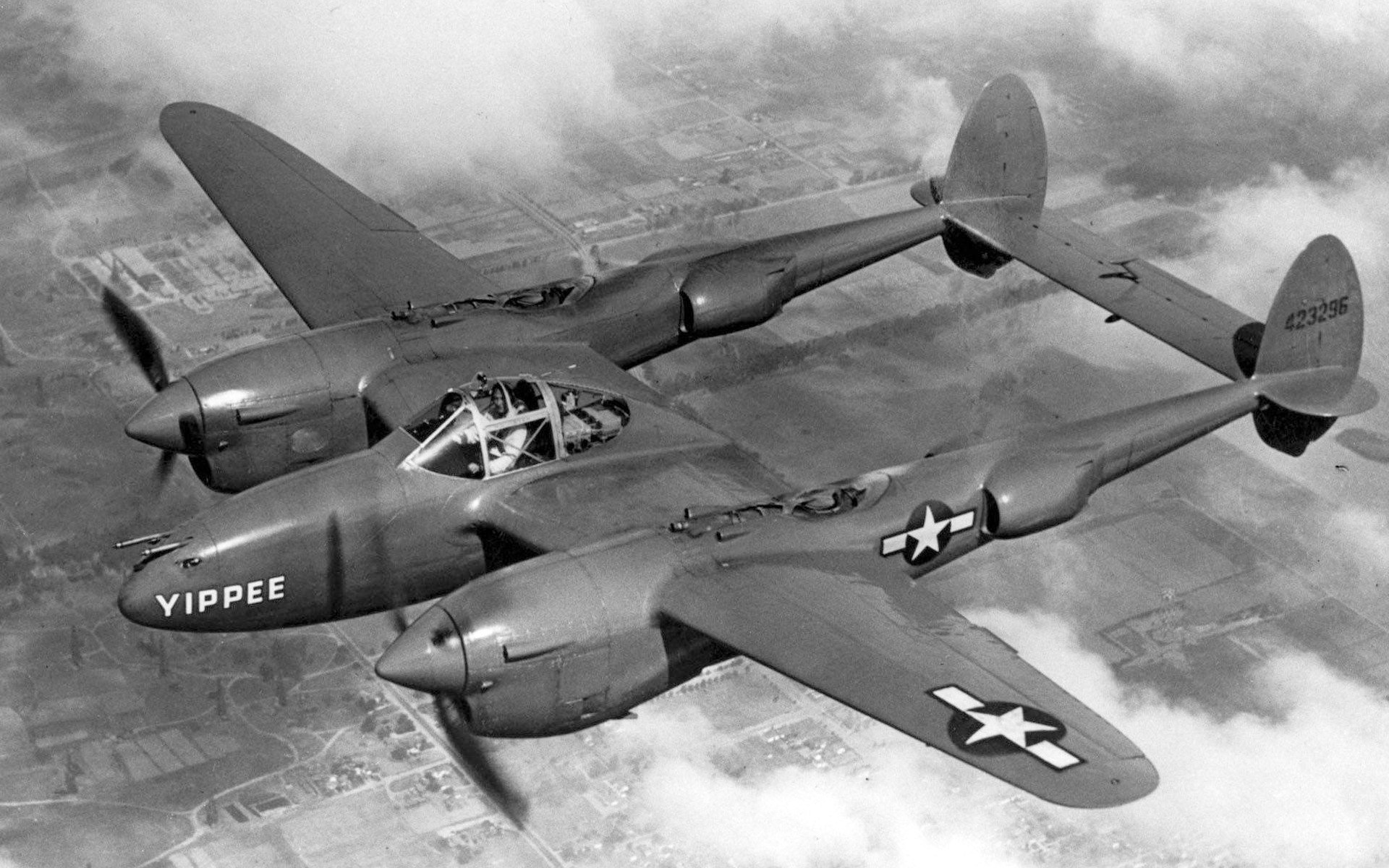
P-38J Lightning Yippee

At the beginning of World War II, Lockheed – under the guidance of Clarence (Kelly) Johnson, who is considered one of the best-known American aircraft designers – answered a specification for an interceptor by submitting the P-38 Lightning fighter aircraft, a twin-engined, twin-boom design. The P-38 was the only American fighter aircraft in production throughout the entirety of American involvement in the war, from Pearl Harbor to Victory over Japan Day. It filled ground-attack, air-to-air, and even tactical bombing roles in all theaters of the war in which the United States operated. The P-38 was responsible for shooting down more Japanese aircraft than any other U.S. Army Air Forces type during the war; it is particularly famous for being the aircraft type that shot down Japanese Admiral Isoroku Yamamoto's airplane.

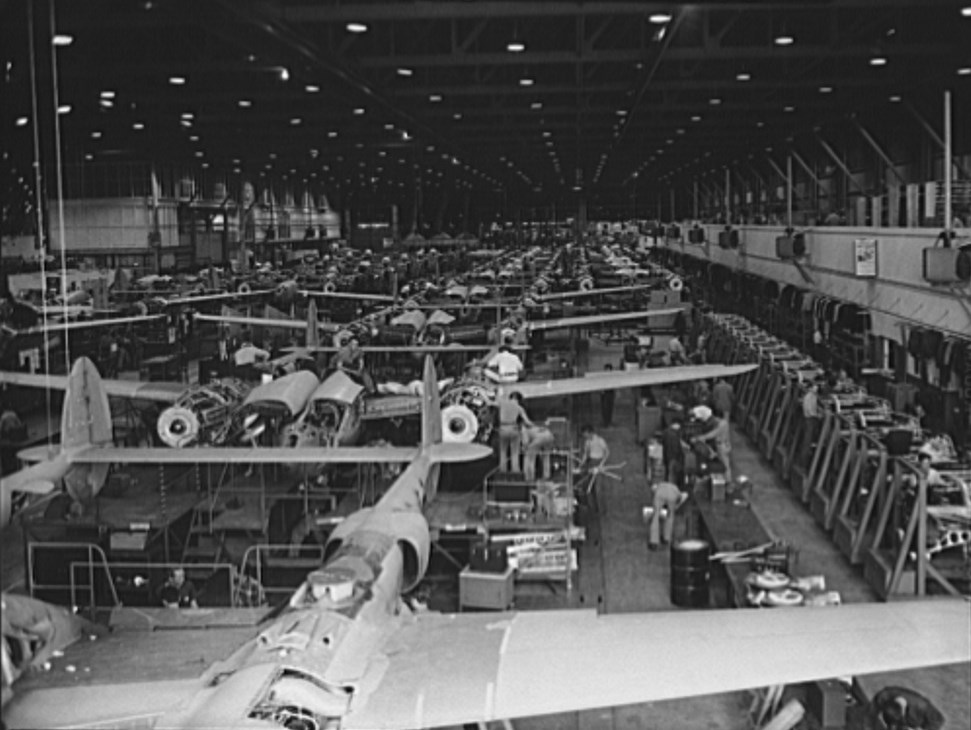
P-38 Lightning assembly line at the Lockheed plant, Burbank, California, in World War II. In June 1943, this assembly line was reconfigured into a mechanized line, which more than doubled the rate of production. The transition to the new system was accomplished in only eight days. During this time production never stopped. It was continued outdoors.

The Lockheed Vega factory was located next to Burbank's Union Airport which it had purchased in 1940. During the war, the entire area was camouflaged in case of enemy reconnaissance. The factory was hidden beneath a huge burlap tarpaulin painted to depict a peaceful semi-rural neighborhood, replete with rubber automobiles. Hundreds of fake trees, shrubs, buildings, and even fire hydrants were positioned to give a three-dimensional appearance. The trees and shrubs were created from chicken wire treated with an adhesive and covered with feathers to provide a leafy texture.

Lockheed ranked tenth among United States corporations in the value of wartime production contracts. All told, Lockheed and its subsidiary Vega produced 19,278 aircraft during World War II, representing six percent of war production, including 2,600 Venturas, 2,750 Boeing B-17 Flying Fortress bombers (built under license from Boeing), 2,900 Hudson bombers, and 9,000 Lightnings.

=== Postwar production ===
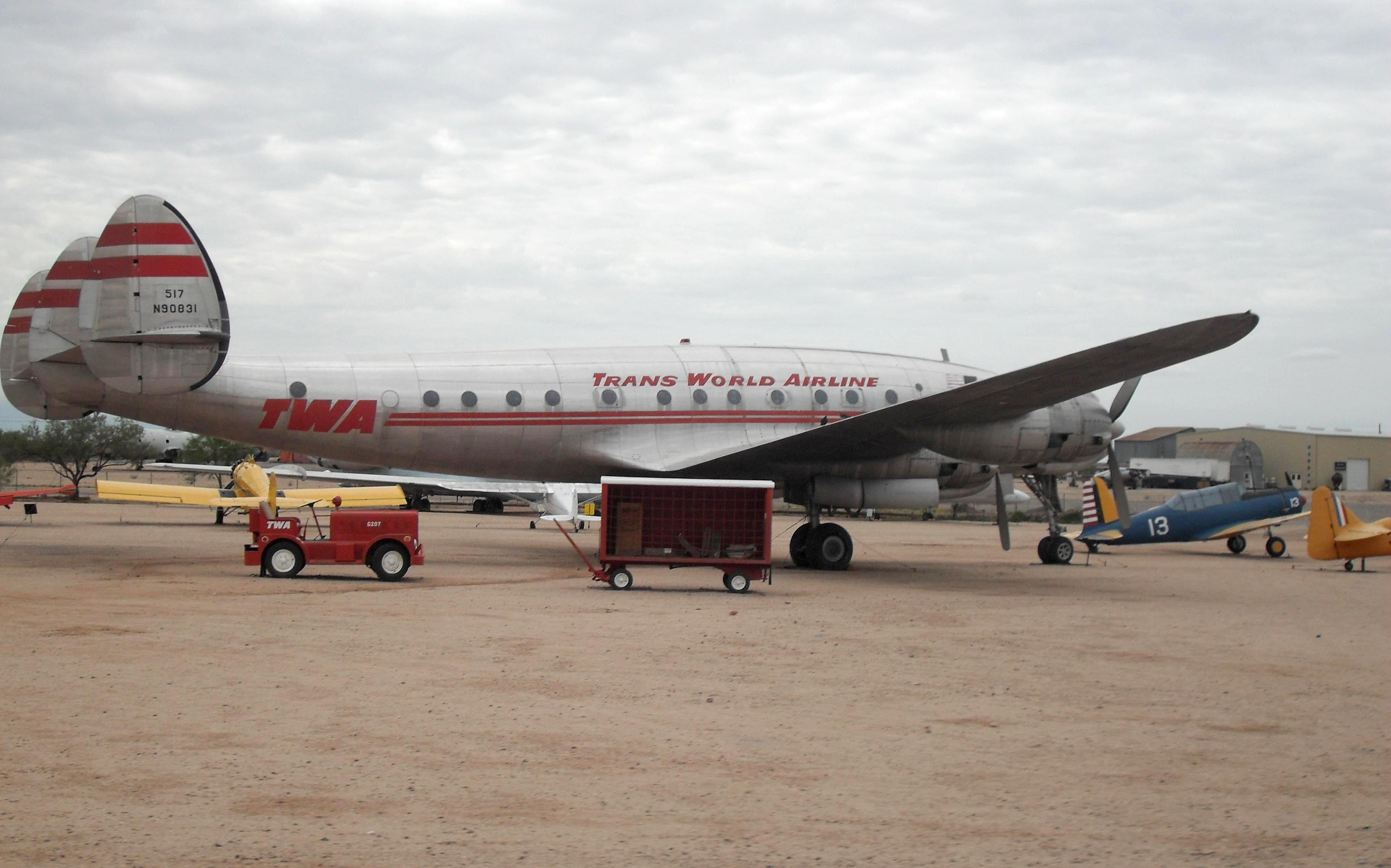
A Lockheed L-049 Constellation sporting the livery of Trans World Airlines at the Pima Air & Space Museum

During World War II, Lockheed, in cooperation with Trans-World Airlines (TWA), had developed the L-049 Constellation, a radical new airliner capable of flying 43 passengers between New York and London at a speed of 300 mph (480 km/h) in 13 hours.

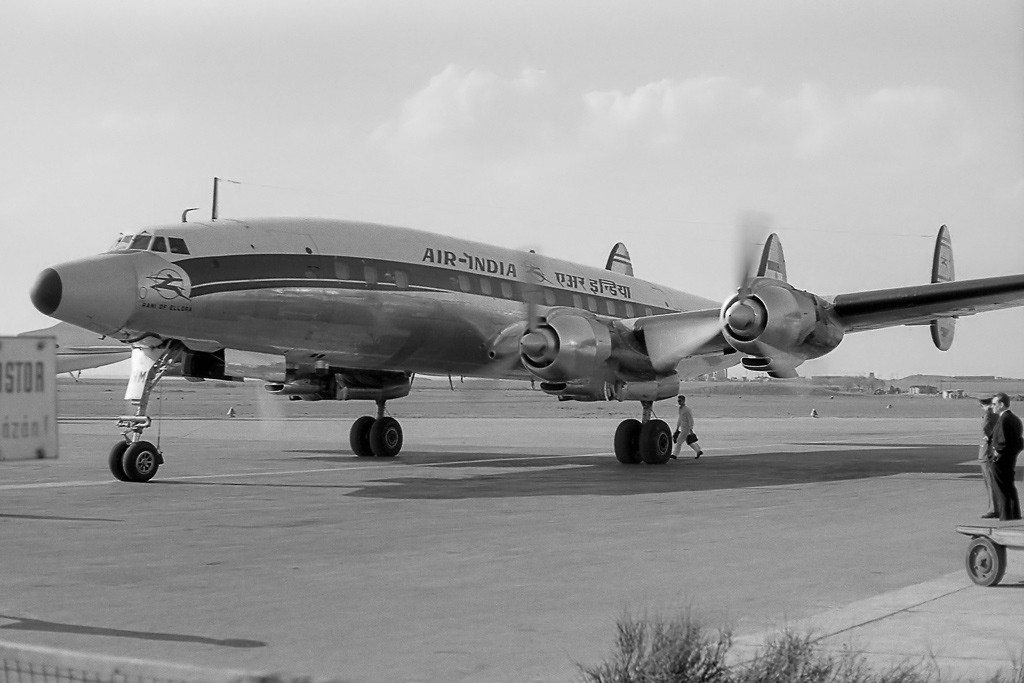
A Lockheed Super Constellation in Air India livery

Once the Constellation (nicknamed Connie) went into production, the military received the first production models; after the war, the airlines received their original orders, giving Lockheed more than a year's head-start over other aircraft manufacturers in what was easily foreseen as the post-war modernization of civilian air travel. The Constellation's performance set new standards which transformed the civilian transportation market. Its signature tri-tail was the result of many initial customers not having hangars tall enough for a conventional tail. Lockheed produced a larger transport, the double-decked R6V Constitution, which was intended to make the Constellation obsolete. However, the design proved underpowered.

The company sought to purchase Convair in 1946, but the sale was blocked by the SEC.

=== Skunk Works ===
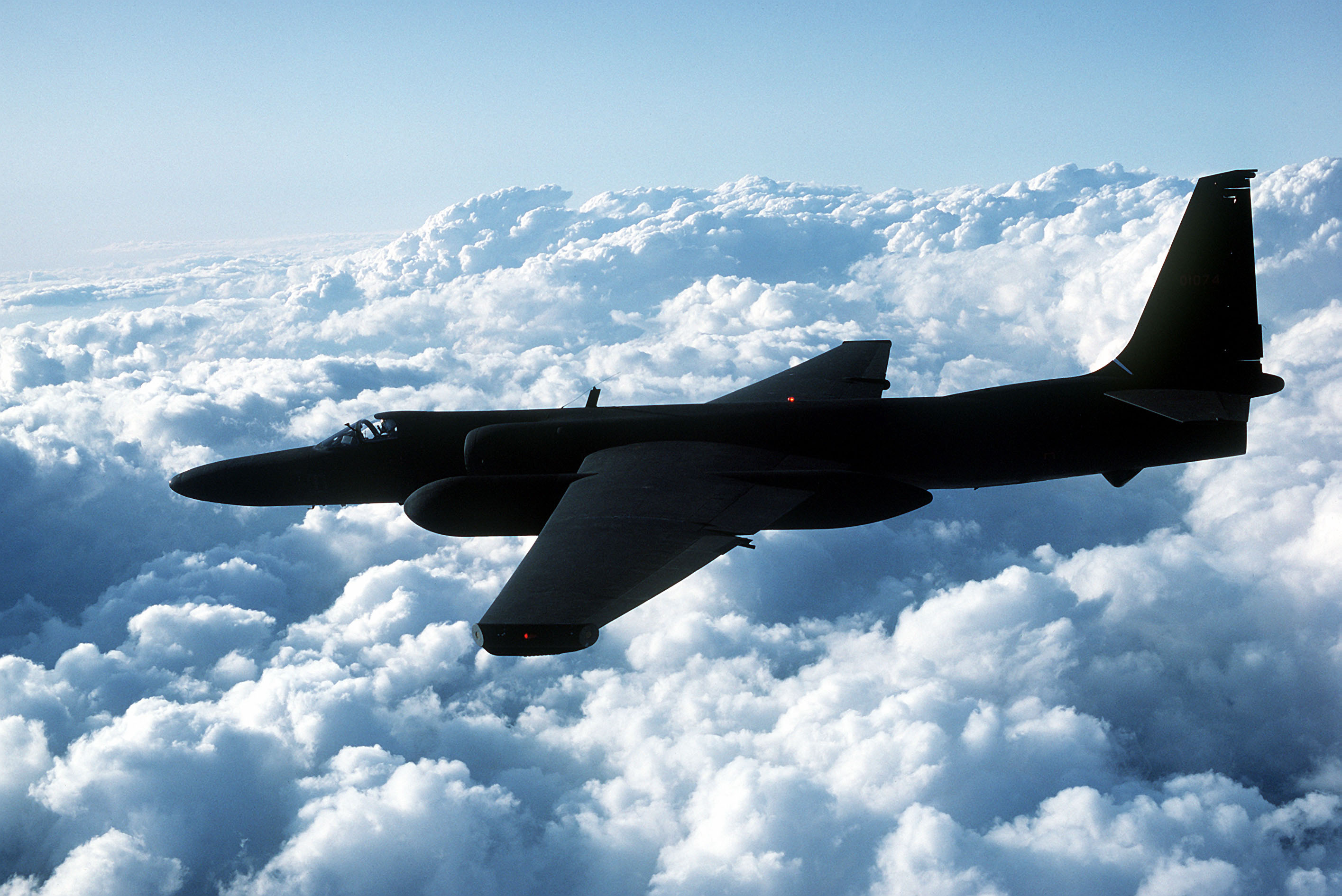
The Lockheed U-2, which first flew in 1955, provided intelligence on Soviet bloc countries.

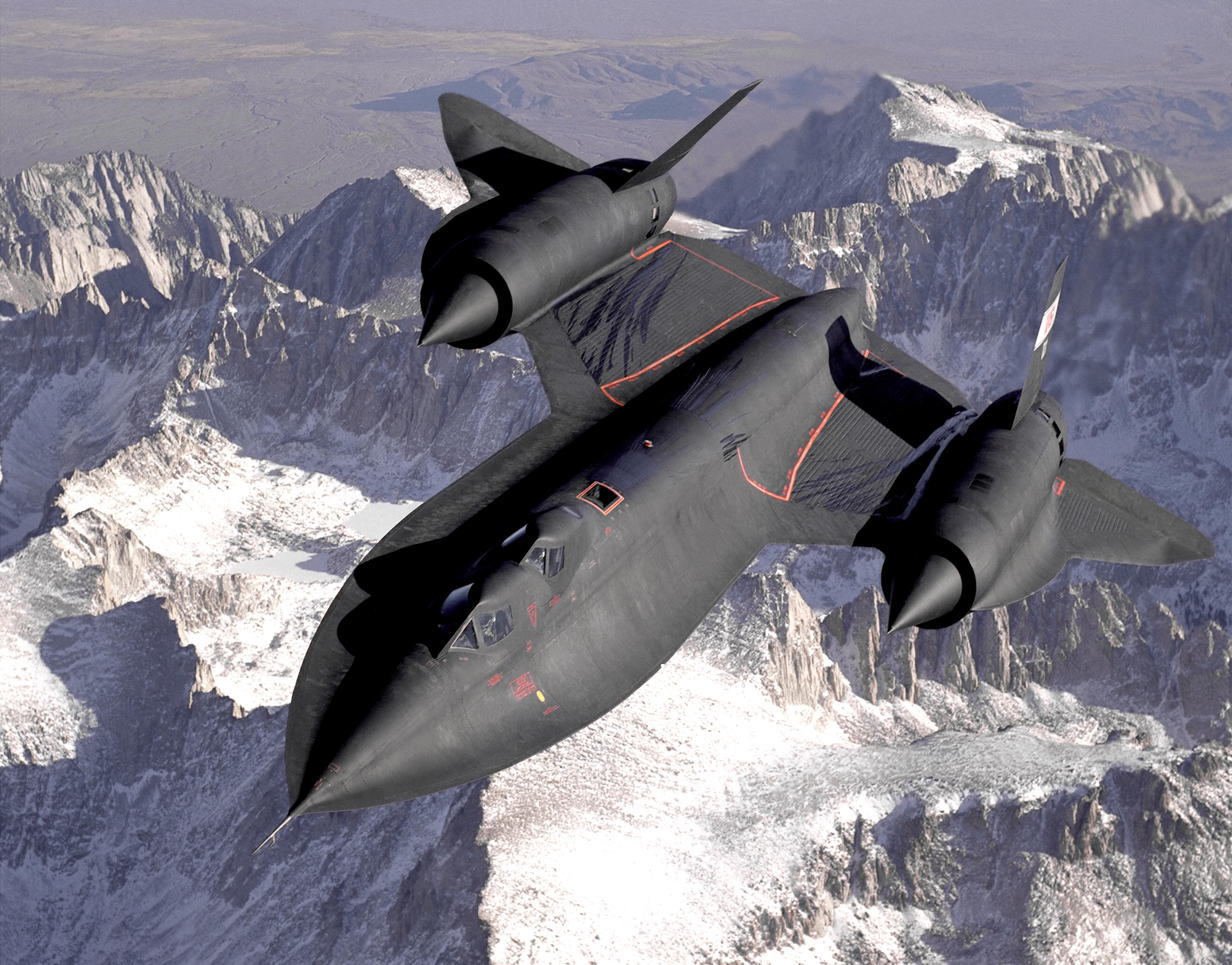
The Lockheed SR-71 Blackbird

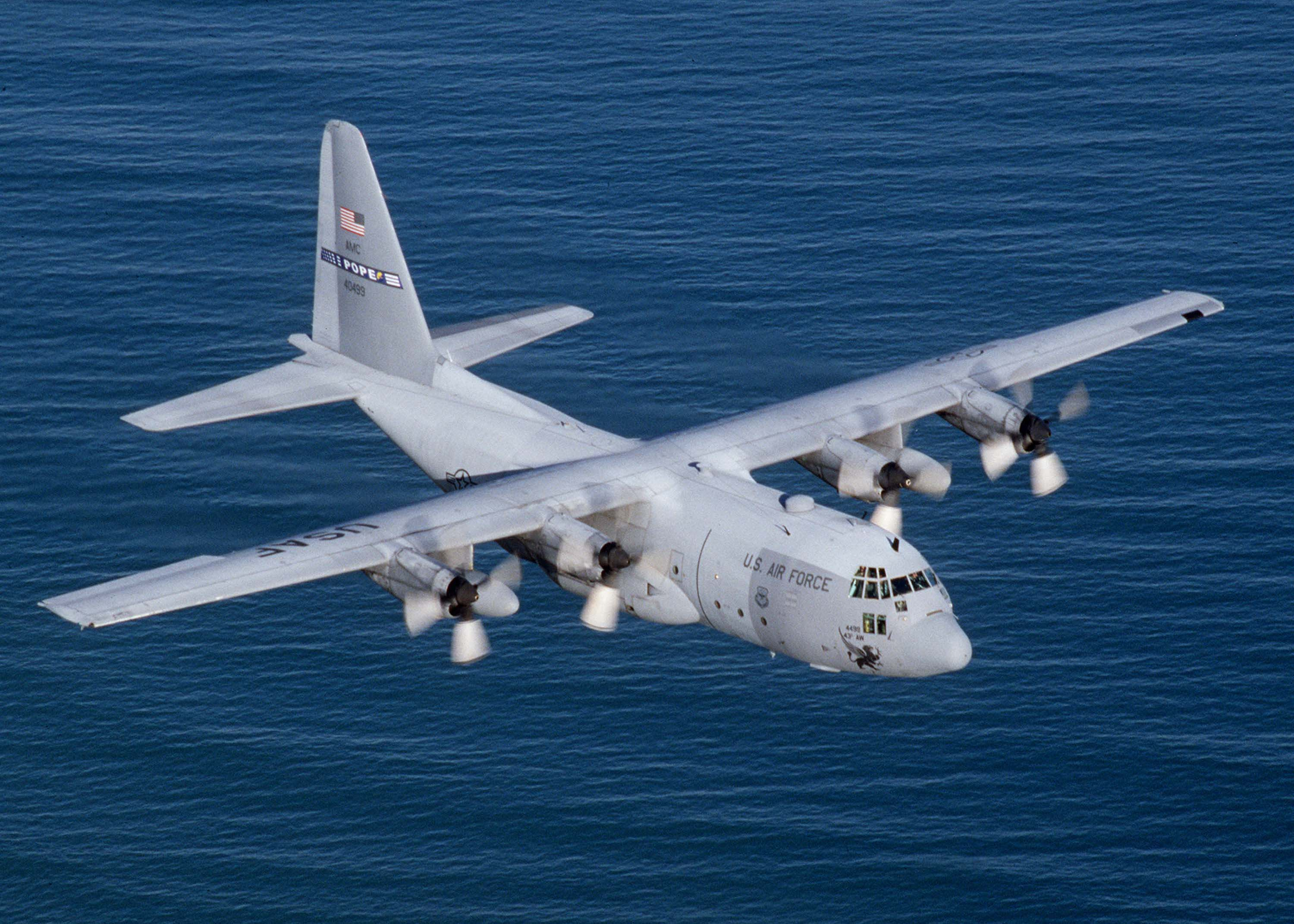
The Lockheed C-130 Hercules serves as the primary tactical transport for many military forces worldwide.

In 1939 when Lockheed was expanding rapidly with war work, the P-38 Lightning prototype construction project was moved to a newly purchased distillery building, the secret project off-limits to all but a core group of engineers. This tight-knit group, led by Kelly Johnson, acted on their own initiative to incorporate advanced technology into the YP-38 prototype. As a result, it was the first fighter airplane to fly 400 mph (644 kph). Many of these engineers moved with Johnson from the smelly former distillery to the P-80 Shooting Star project. Johnson said in 1964 that the YP-38 was the inception of the Skunk Works concept.

In 1943, Lockheed began, in secrecy, development of a new jet fighter at its Burbank facility. This fighter, the P-80, became the first American jet fighter to score a kill. It also recorded the first jet-to-jet aerial kill, downing a Mikoyan-Gurevich MiG-15 in Korea, although by this time the F-80 (as it was redesignated in June 1948) was already considered obsolete.

Starting with the P-80, Lockheed's secret development work was conducted by its Advanced Development Division, more commonly known as the Skunk Works. The name was taken from Al Capp's comic strip Li'l Abner. This organization has become famous and spawned many successful Lockheed designs, including the U-2 (late 1950s), SR-71 Blackbird (1962) and F-117 Nighthawk stealth fighter (1978). The Skunk Works often created high-quality designs in a short time and sometimes with limited resources.

=== Projects during the Cold War ===
In 1954, the Lockheed C-130 Hercules, a durable four-engined transport, flew for the first time. This type remains in production today. In 1956, Lockheed received a contract for the development of the Polaris Submarine Launched Ballistic Missile (SLBM); it would be followed by the Poseidon and Trident nuclear missiles. Lockheed developed the F-104 Starfighter in the late 1950s, the world's first Mach 2 fighter jet. In the early 1960s, the company introduced the C-141 Starlifter four-engine jet transport.

During the 1960s, Lockheed began development for two large aircraft: the C-5 Galaxy military transport and the L-1011 TriStar wide-body civil airliner. Both projects encountered delays and cost overruns. The C-5 was built to vague initial requirements and suffered from structural weaknesses, which Lockheed was forced to correct at its own expense. The TriStar competed for the same market as the McDonnell Douglas DC-10; delays in Rolls-Royce engine development caused the TriStar to fall behind the DC-10. The C-5 and L-1011 projects, the canceled U.S. Army AH-56 Cheyenne helicopter program, and embroiled shipbuilding contracts caused Lockheed to lose large sums of money during the 1970s.

==== Loan guarantee ====
Drowning in debt, in 1971 Lockheed (then the largest US defense contractor) asked the US government for a loan guarantee, to avoid insolvency. Lockheed argued that a government bailout was necessary due to the company's value for U.S. national security. On May 13, 1971, the Richard Nixon administration sent a bill titled "The Emergency Loan Guarantee Act" to Congress requesting a $250 million loan guarantee for Lockheed and its L-1011 Tristar airbus program. The measure was hotly debated in the US Senate. The chief antagonist was Senator William Proxmire (D-Wis), the nemesis of Lockheed and its chairman, Daniel J. Haughton. Some of the debate in Congress developed over what conditions should be attached to the bailout. Senator Alan Cranston demanded that the management be forced to step down, lest it set a precedent rewarding wasteful spending. Others argued that the company should be allowed to go into bankruptcy citing the recent decision to leave Penn Central railroad to that fate, and the fact that the airbus program at issue was commercial rather than military.

Naval scholar Thomas Paul Stanton notes that the opposition to the bill held it was "the beginning of the socialization of the American aircraft and aerospace industry." Proponents responded by claiming "this socializing process had taken place many years before", and some witnesses before Congress discounted "the very notion of 'free enterprise'." Treasury Secretary Connally pointed to the faltering economy and worries about unemployment while testifying "the time has come within the United States when we have to look at things differently. Free enterprise is just not all that free." Questions arose whether letting Lockheed fail would be bad for the market due to decreased competition or good by screening out inefficient competitors and mismanagement. Lockheed's competitors, McDonnell Douglas and General Electric (collaborators on the DC-10) strongly opposed the bill and they feared the government would steer contracts to Lockheed to insure loan payments. Admiral Hyman G. Rickover condemned the bill saying it represented "a new philosophy where we privatize profits and socialize losses." The New York Times editorial board held that the Nixon administration was violating its own free enterprise principles by advocating for the loan. (Later, historian Stephen J. Whitfield viewed the passage of the loan guarantee as a support for the argument that America was shifting away from Lockean liberalism.)

Following a fierce debate, Vice President Spiro T. Agnew cast a tie-breaking vote in favor of the measure on August 2, 1971. President Nixon signed the bill into law on August 9, 1971 - which became colloquially known as the "Lockheed Loan". Even after its adoption, a further controversy developed when the Emergency Loan Guarantee Board set up by the Executive branch to oversee the loan refused to allow Congress' General Accounting Office to examine its records. They argued that the office was attempting "interference in the decision-making process" amounting to an effort to "bully" and "harass" the board. This claim was denied by Comptroller General Elmer B. Staats, and efforts were made by Senator William Proxmire to get Treasury Secretary John Connally to testify due to the suspicion that the loan guarantee was in jeopardy. The editorial board of The New York Times blasted the situation, citing it as another argument against the propriety of the loan guarantee and the precedent it set for other failing companies. The debate around the ramifications of the Lockheed loan guarantee soon resurfaced in late 1975 with discussions on possible aid to New York City during its fiscal crisis.

Lockheed finished paying off the $1.4 billion loan in 1977, along with about $112.22 million in loan guarantee fees.

=== Bribery scandals ===
The Lockheed bribery scandals were a series of illegal bribes and contributions made by Lockheed officials from the late 1950s to the 1970s. In late 1975 and early 1976, a subcommittee of the U.S. Senate led by Senator Frank Church concluded that members of the Lockheed board had paid members of friendly governments to guarantee contracts for military aircraft. In 1976, it was publicly revealed that Lockheed had paid $22 million in bribes to foreign officials in the process of negotiating the sale of aircraft including the F-104 Starfighter, the so-called Deal of the Century.

The scandal caused considerable political controversy in West Germany, the Netherlands, Italy, and Japan. In the US, the scandal led to passage of the Foreign Corrupt Practices Act, and nearly led to the ailing corporation's downfall (it was already struggling due to the poor sales of the L-1011 airliner). Haughton resigned his post as chairman.

=== Attempted leveraged buyout ===
In the late 1980s, leveraged buyout specialist Harold Simmons conducted a widely publicized but unsuccessful takeover attempt on the Lockheed Corporation, having gradually acquired almost 20 percent of its stock. Lockheed was attractive to Simmons because one of its primary investors was the California Public Employees' Retirement System (CalPERS), the pension fund of the state of California. At the time, the New York Times said, "Much of Mr. Simmons's interest in Lockheed is believed to stem from its pension plan, which is over funded by more than $1.4 billion. Analysts said he might want to liquidate the plan and pay out the excess funds to shareholders, including himself." Citing the mismanagement by its chairman, Daniel M. Tellep, Simmons stated a wish to replace its board with a slate of his own choosing, since he was the largest investor. His board nominations included former Texas Senator John Tower, the onetime chairman of the Armed Services Committee, and Admiral Elmo Zumwalt Jr., a former Chief of Naval Operations. Simmons had first begun accumulating Lockheed stock in early 1989 when deep Pentagon cuts to the defense budget had driven down prices of military contractor stocks, and analysts had not believed he would attempt the takeover since he was also at the time pursuing control of Georgia Gulf.

=== Merger with Martin Marietta ===
Merger talks between Lockheed and Martin Marietta began in March 1994, with the companies announcing their $10 billion planned merger on August 30, 1994. The headquarters for the combined companies would be at Martin Marietta headquarters in North Bethesda, Maryland. The deal was finalized on March 15, 1995, when the two companies' shareholders approved the merger. The segments of the two companies not retained by the new company formed the basis for L-3 Communications, a mid-size defense contractor in its own right. Lockheed Martin also later spun off the materials company Martin Marietta Materials.

The company's executives received large bonuses directly from the government as a result of the merger. Norman R. Augustine who was at the time CEO of Martin Marietta received an $8.2 million bonus.

Both companies contributed important products to the new portfolio. Lockheed products included the Trident missile, P-3 Orion maritime patrol aircraft, U-2 and SR-71 reconnaissance airplanes, F-117 Nighthawk, F-16 Fighting Falcon, F-22 Raptor, C-130 Hercules, A-4AR Fightinghawk and the DSCS-3 satellite. Martin Marietta products included Titan rockets, Sandia National Laboratories (management contract acquired in 1993), Space Shuttle External Tank, Viking 1 and Viking 2 landers, the Transfer Orbit Stage (under subcontract to Orbital Sciences Corporation) and various satellite models.

=== Timeline ===
- 1912: The Alco Hydro-Aeroplane Company established.
- 1916: Company renamed Loughead Aircraft Manufacturing Company.
- 1926: Lockheed Aircraft Company formed.
- 1929: Lockheed becomes a division of Detroit Aircraft.
- 1932: Robert and Courtland Gross take control of the company after the bankruptcy of Detroit Aircraft. The company is renamed Lockheed Aircraft Corporation, reflecting the company's reorganization under a board of directors.
- 1941: Lockheed P-38 Lightning is introduced, one of the most successful fighters of World War II, and the namesake to the Lockheed Martin F-35 Lightning II
- 1943: Lockheed's Skunk Works founded in Burbank, California.
- 1954: First flight of the Lockheed C-130 Hercules.
- 1954: Maiden flight of the Lockheed U-2.
- 1961: Grand Central Rocket Company acquired as Lockheed Propulsion Company.
- 1962: First flight of the A-12 Blackbird.
- 1964: First flight of the Lockheed SR-71 Blackbird.
- 1970 First flight of the L-1011 TriStar.
- 1971 Healthcare Systems Development Division, Palo Alto, California. Spun out as Technicon and ultimately acquired by Veradigm.
- 1972 DIALOG Information Retrieval Service announced as commercial online service (spun out as wholly owned subsidiary in 1982.)
- 1976: The Lockheed bribery scandals.
- 1977: Company renamed Lockheed Corporation, to reflect non-aviation activities of the company.
- 1978: The company's Hollywood-Burbank Airport is sold to its nearby cities and becomes Burbank-Glendale-Pasadena Airport (later renamed Bob Hope Airport in 2003).
- 1981: First flight of the F-117 Nighthawk.
- 1985: Acquires Metier Management Systems.
- 1986: Acquires Sanders Associates electronics of Nashua, New Hampshire.
- 1991: Lockheed, General Dynamics and Boeing begin development of the F-22 Raptor.
- 1992: All aerospace-related activities end at the Burbank facility.
- 1993: Acquires General Dynamics' Fort Worth aircraft division, builder of the F-16 Fighting Falcon.
- 1995: Lockheed Corporation merges with Martin Marietta to form Lockheed Martin.

== Divisions ==
In 1984 Lockheed's operations were divided between several groups and divisions, many of which continue to operate within Lockheed

=== Aeronautical Systems group ===
- Lockheed-California Company (CALAC), Burbank, California.
- Lockheed-Georgia Company (GELAC), Marietta, Georgia.
- Lockheed Advanced Aeronautics Company, Santa Clarita, California.
- Lockheed Aircraft Service Company (LAS), Ontario, California.
- Lockheed Air Terminal, Inc. (LAT), Burbank, California, now Bob Hope Airport and owned by the Burbank-Glendale-Pasadena Airport Authority.

=== Missiles, Space, and Electronics Systems Group ===
- Lockheed Missiles & Space Company, Inc., Sunnyvale, California.
- Lockheed Propulsion Company, Redlands, California.
- Lockheed Space Operations Company, Titusville, Florida.
- Lockheed Engineering and Management Services Company, Inc., Houston, Texas.
- Lockheed Electronics Company, Inc., Plainfield, New Jersey.

=== Marine Systems group ===
- Lockheed Shipbuilding Company, Seattle, Washington.
- Lockport Marine Company, Portland, Oregon.
- Advanced Marine Systems, Santa Clara, California.

=== Information Systems group ===
- Datacom Systems Corporation, Teaneck, New Jersey.
- CADAM Inc., Burbank, California.
- Lockheed Data Plan, Inc., Los Gatos, California.
- DIALOG Information Services, Inc, Palo Alto, California.
- Metier Management Systems, London, England.
- Integrated Systems and Solutions, Gaithersburg, Maryland.

== Products ==
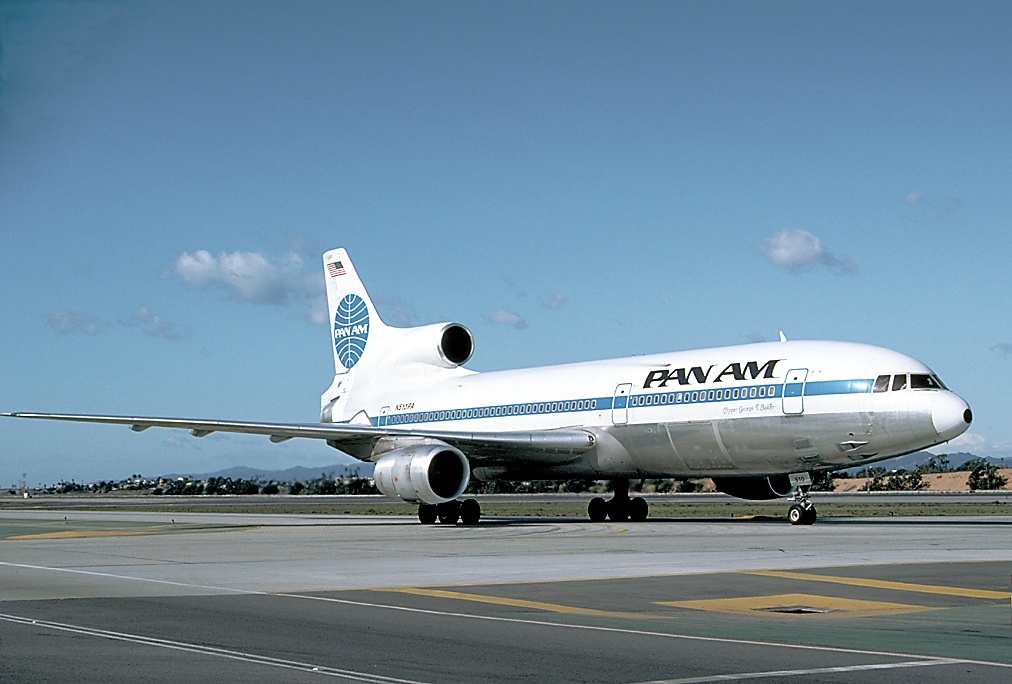
Lockheed's most advanced airliner, the L-1011 Tristar

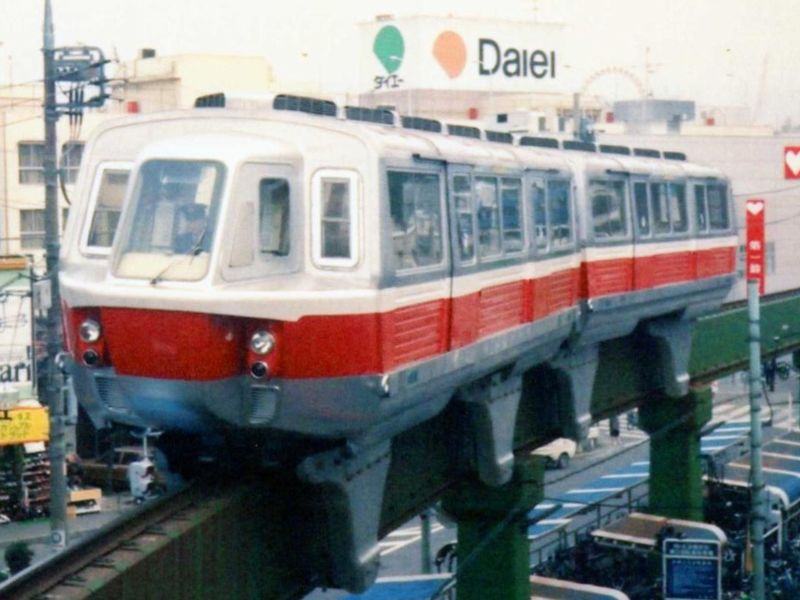
Odakyu Type 500 monorail, 1990. (1966–2001)

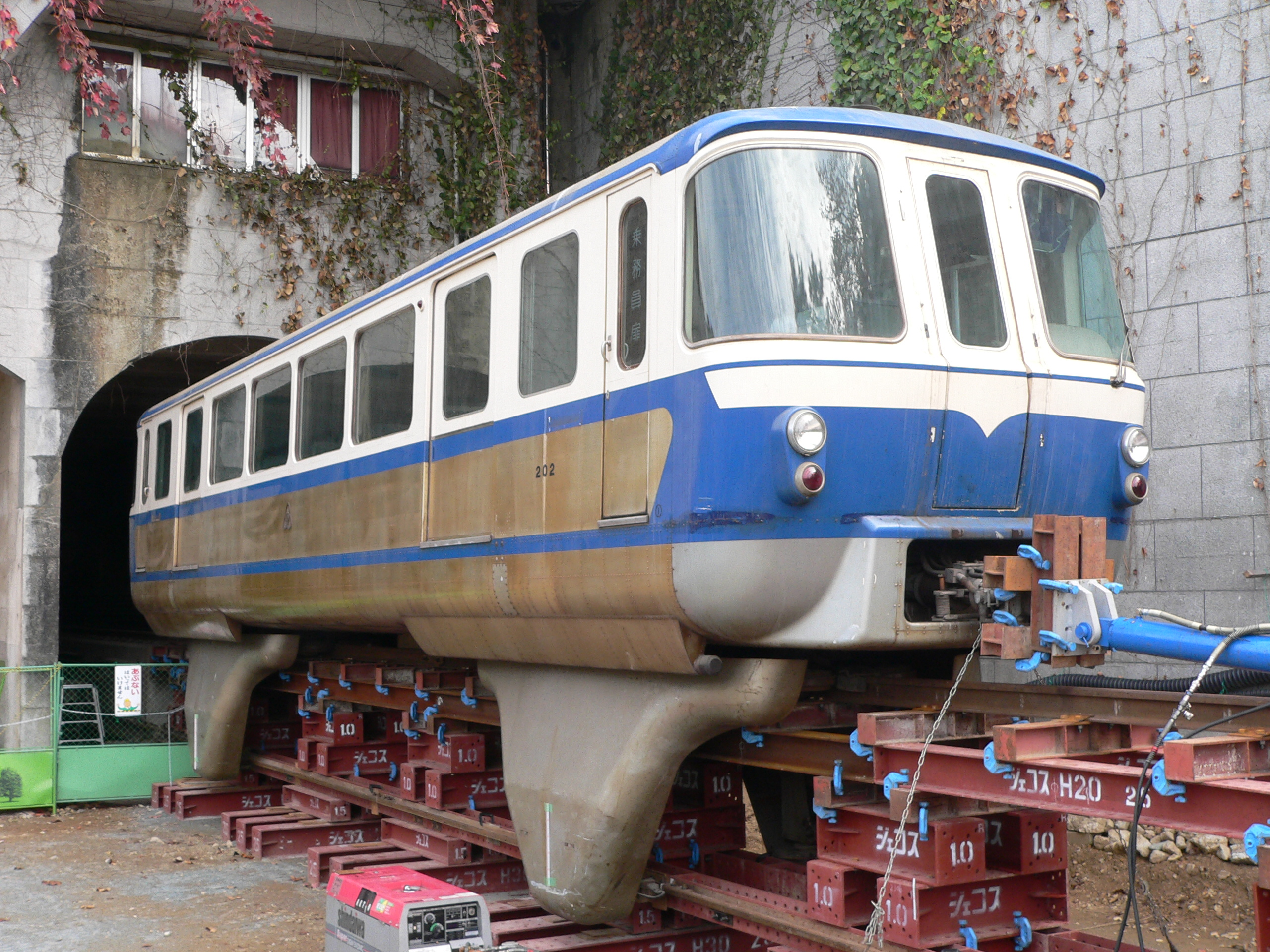
Preserved Himeji Monorail coach 202, November 2009 (1966–1974)

A partial listing of aircraft and other vehicles produced by Lockheed.

=== Airliners and civil transports ===
- Lockheed Vega
- Lockheed Model 10 Electra
- Lockheed Model 12 Electra Junior
- Lockheed Model 14 Super Electra
- Lockheed Model 18 Lodestar
- Lockheed Constellation, airliner
- Lockheed L-049 Constellation, first model of the Lockheed Constellation
- Lockheed L-649 Constellation, improved Lockheed Constellation
- Lockheed L-749 Constellation, further improved Lockheed Constellation
- Lockheed L-1049 Super Constellation, largest produced model of the Lockheed Constellation
- Lockheed L-1649 Starliner, last model of the Lockheed Constellation
- Lockheed Saturn
- Lockheed L-188 Electra
- Lockheed JetStar, business jet
- Lockheed L-1011 TriStar, wide-body airliner

=== Military transports ===
- Lockheed C-69/Lockheed C-121 Constellation, military transport versions of the Constellation
  - YC-121F Constellation, experimental turboprop version
- Lockheed R6V Constitution, large transport aircraft
- Lockheed C-130 Hercules, medium combat transport (AC-130 gunship) (other variants)
- Lockheed C-141 Starlifter, long-range jet transport
- Lockheed C-5 Galaxy, heavy transport
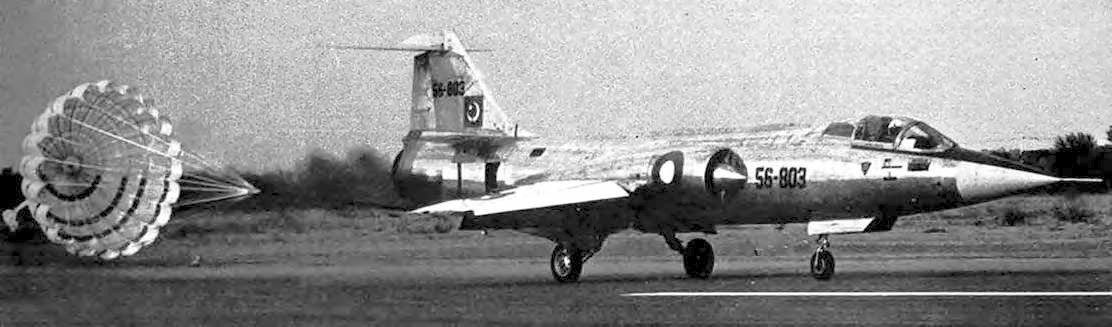
  A Pakistani F-104
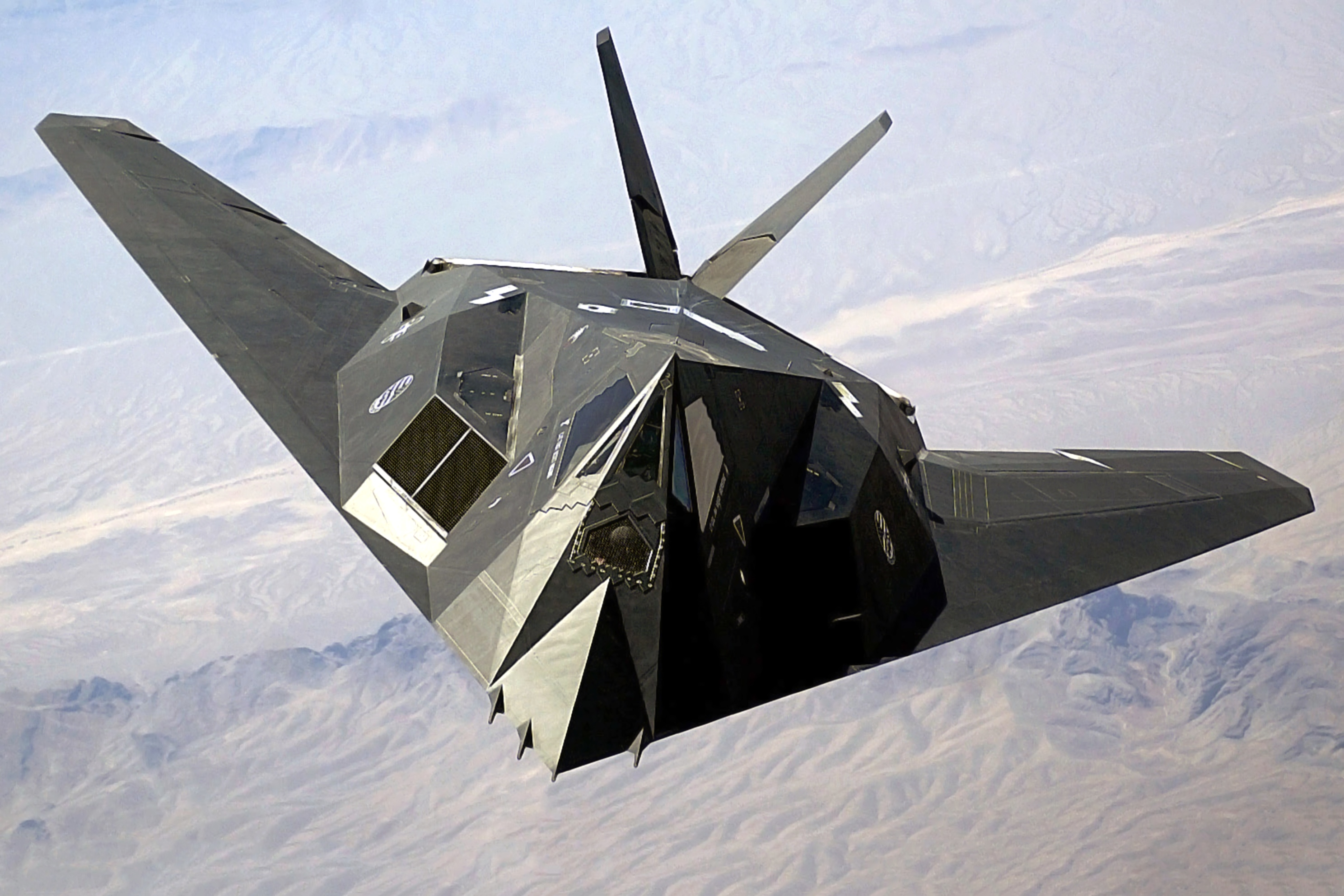
  The F-117, Lockheed's advanced stealth fighter
- Flatbed, military transport project, canceled

=== Fighters ===
- Lockheed P-38 Lightning, twin-engine propeller fighter
- Lockheed P-80 Shooting Star, the United States Air Force's first operational jet fighter
- Lockheed T-33 Shooting Star, trainer jet
- Lockheed F-94 Starfire, all-weather fighter
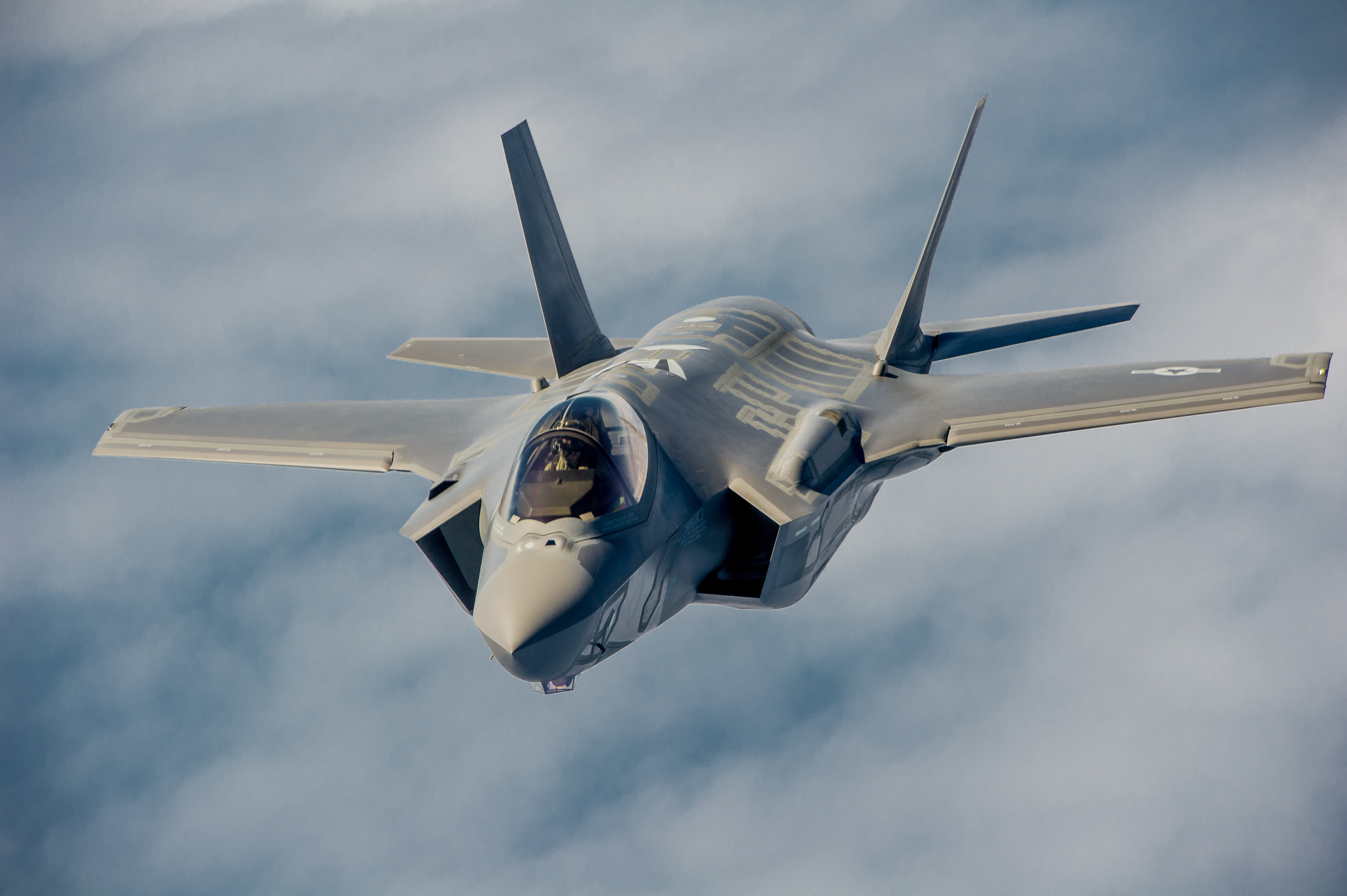
- Lockheed's multirole F-35
  Lockheed F-104 Starfighter, interceptor and later a multi-mission fighter, the 'missile with a man in it'
- Lockheed F-117 Nighthawk, stealth fighter attack aircraft
- General Dynamics F-16 Fighting Falcon, multirole fighter (Originally General Dynamics)
- Lockheed F-22, air superiority stealth fighter
- Lockheed F-35, air superiority and strike missions

=== Patrol and reconnaissance ===
- Lockheed Hudson, maritime patrol/bomber
- PV-1 Ventura and PV-2 Harpoon, Maritime patrol/bomber
- PO-1W/WV-1 Constellation, AWACS version of the Constellation
- EC-121/WV-2 Warning Star, AWACS version of the Super Constellation
- Lockheed P-2 Neptune, maritime patrol
- Lockheed P-3 Orion, ASW patrol
  - Lockheed CP-140 Aurora, Maritime patrol aircraft
- Lockheed U-2/TR-1, reconnaissance
- Lockheed SR-71 Blackbird, reconnaissance (A-12) (M-21) (YF-12)
- Lockheed S-3 Viking, patrol/attack
- YO-3A Quiet Star

=== Helicopters ===
- Lockheed CL-475, rigid-rotor helicopter
- XH-51A/B (Lockheed CL-595/Model 286), compound helicopter testbed
- Lockheed AH-56 Cheyenne, prototype attack compound helicopter

=== Missiles ===
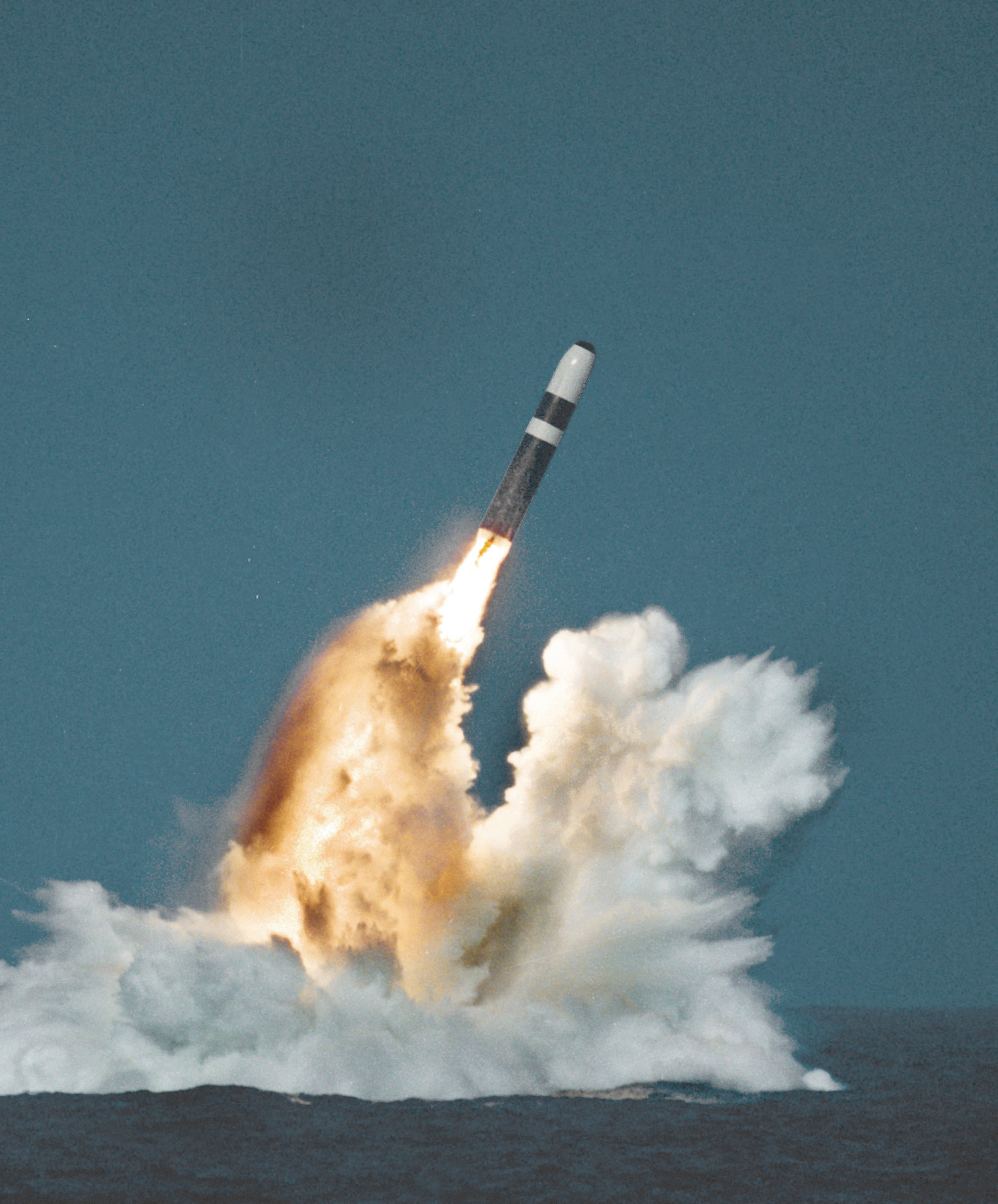
Lockheed Trident II missile, introduced in 1990

- UGM-27 Polaris
- UGM-73 Poseidon
- UGM-89 Perseus
- Trident
  - UGM-96 Trident I
  - UGM-133 Trident II
- High Virgo

=== Space technology ===
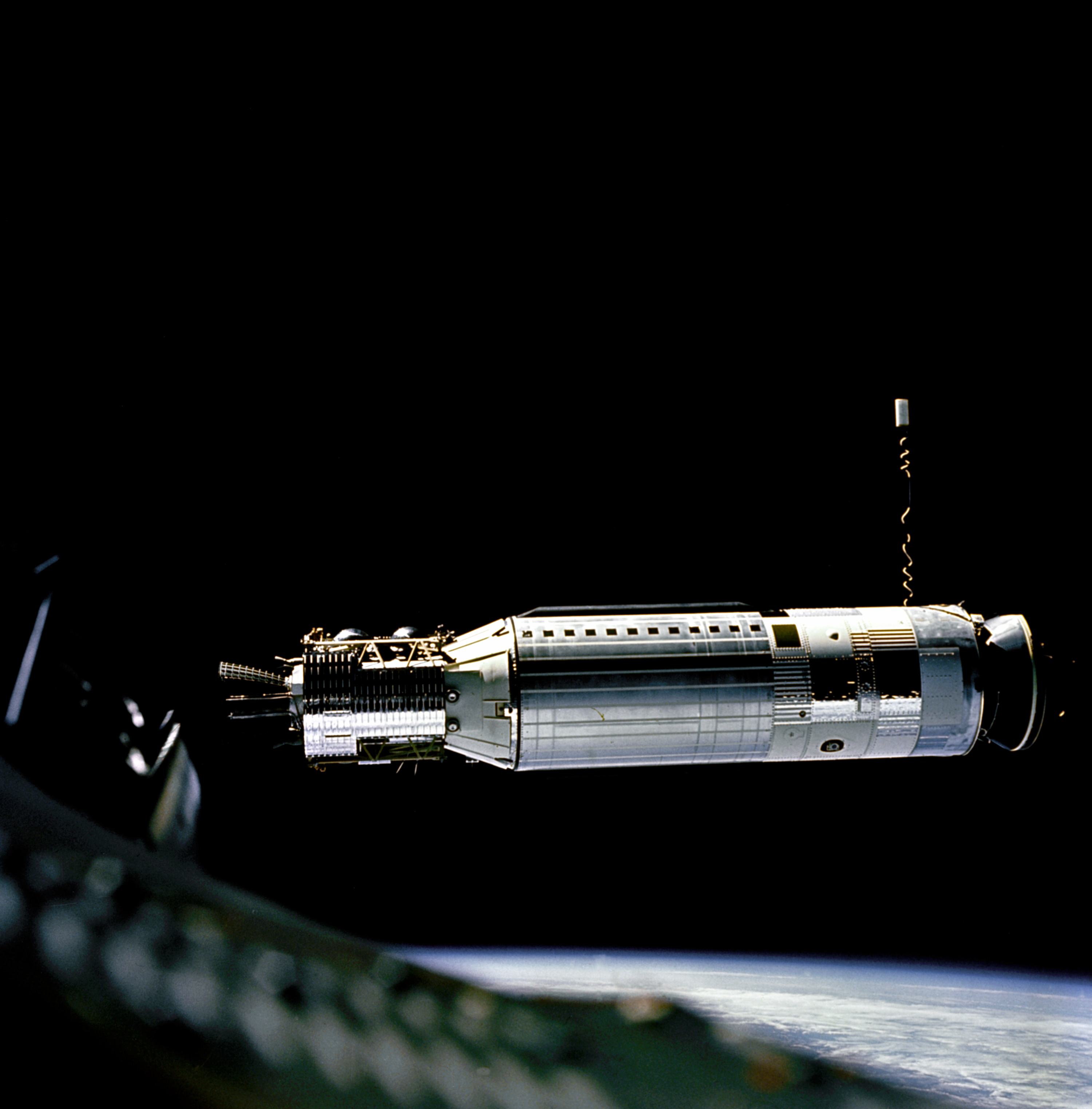
- Lockheed's advanced upper rocket stage, the Agena
  Lockheed X-7
- Lockheed X-17
- Lockheed L-301 (aka X-24C)
- Lockheed Star Clipper
- Corona
- RM-81 Agena
  - Agena target vehicle
- Apollo Launch Escape System
- Hubble Space Telescope

=== Sea vessels ===
- Sea Shadow

=== Rail vehicles ===
- Odakyu Type 500 monorail for Mukōgaoka-Yūen Monorail (as Nihon-Lockheed Monorail, with Kawasaki Heavy Industries)
- Himeji Monorail Type 100/200 (as Nihon-Lockheed Monorail, with Kawasaki Heavy Industries)

== Leadership ==
=== President ===
1. Lloyd Stearman, 1932–1934
2. Robert Ellsworth Gross, 1934–1956
3. Courtlandt Sherrington Gross, 1956–1961
4. Daniel Jeremiah Haughton, 1961–1967
5. Archibald Carlisle Kotchian, 1967–1976
6. Lawrence Oscar Kitchen, 1976–1986
7. Robert Alexander Fuhrman, 1986–1988
8. Daniel Michael Tellep, 1988–1995

=== Chairman of the Board ===
1. Robert Ellsworth Gross, 1933–1961
2. Courtlandt Sherrington Gross, 1961–1967
3. Daniel Jeremiah Haughton, 1967–1976
4. Robert William Haack, 1976–1977
5. Roy Arnold Anderson, 1977–1986
6. Lawrence Oscar Kitchen, 1986–1988
7. Daniel Michael Tellep, 1989–1995

== See also ==
- Vega Aircraft Corporation
- Lloyd Stearman
- California during World War II
