= Convair XC-99 =

American prototype cargo plane (1949–57)

Coordinates: 32.14870°N 110.84233°W

XC-99
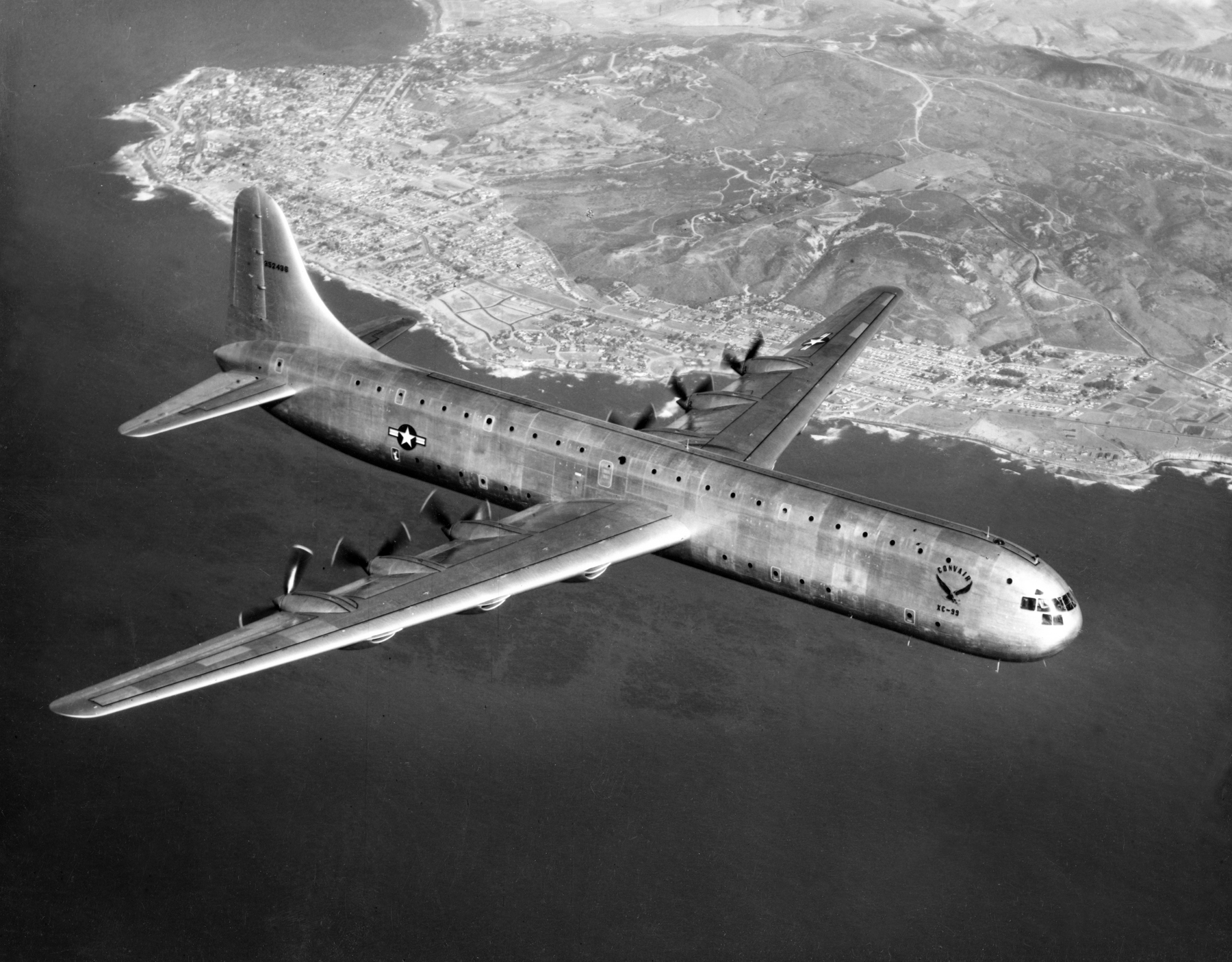
- The sole prototype XC-99 off La Jolla in its early days of operation, before fitment of a nose radome and four-wheel main gear bogies

General information
- Type: Heavy transport
- National origin: United States
- Manufacturer: Convair
- Status: Canceled
- Primary user: United States Air Force
- Number built: 1
- Serial: 43-52436
- Total hours: 7,400 hours

History
- Introduction date: 26 May 1949
- First flight: 24 November 1947
- Retired: 1957
- Developed from: Convair B-36 Peacemaker

The Convair XC-99, AF Ser. No. 43-52436, is a prototype heavy cargo aircraft built by Convair for the United States Air Force. It was the largest land-based piston engine transport aircraft ever built, and was developed from the Convair B-36 Peacemaker bomber, sharing the wings and some other structures with it. The first flight was on 24 November 1947 in San Diego, California, and after testing, it was delivered to the Air Force on 26 May 1949, serving in varying capacities until 1957. The Convair Model 37 was a planned civil double-deck passenger variant based on the XC-99, but was not built.

== Design and development ==
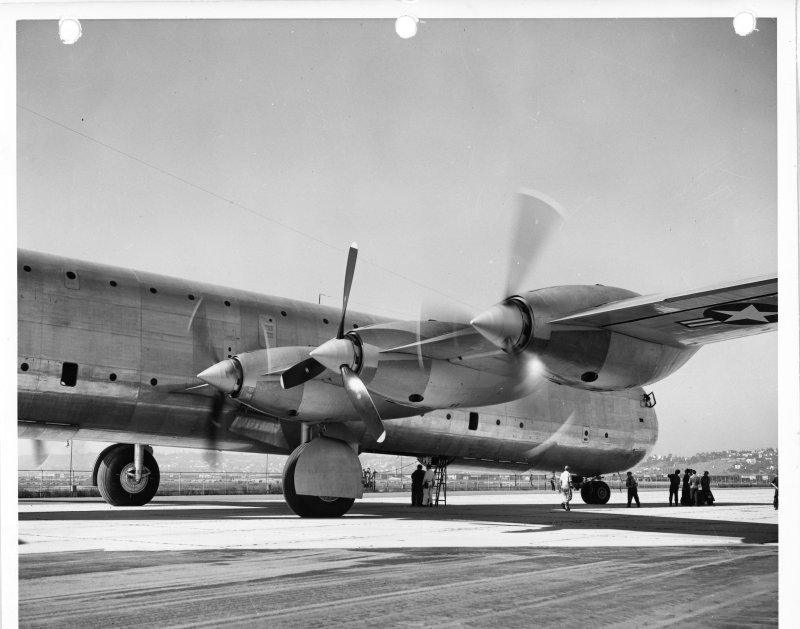
Convair XC-99 running engines no. 4 and 6

Design capacity of the XC-99 was 100,000 lb (45,000 kg) of cargo or 400 fully equipped soldiers on its double cargo decks. A cargo lift was installed for easier loading. The engines face rearward in a pusher configuration.

=== Planned civil passenger variant ===
The Convair Model 37 was a large civil passenger design derived from the XC-99 but was never built. The Model 37 was to be of similar proportions to the XC-99; 182 ft 6 in (55.63 m) length, 230 ft (70 m) wingspan, and a high-capacity, double-deck fuselage. The projected passenger load was to be 204, with an effective range of 4,200 mi (6,800 km).

Fifteen aircraft were ordered by Pan American Airways for transatlantic service. However, the fuel and oil consumption of the six 3,500 hp (2,600 kW) Wasp Major radials powering the XC-99 and B-36 meant that the design was not economically viable, and the hoped-for turboprop powerplants did not materialize fast enough. The low number of orders was not sufficient to initiate production, and the project was abandoned.

== Operational history ==
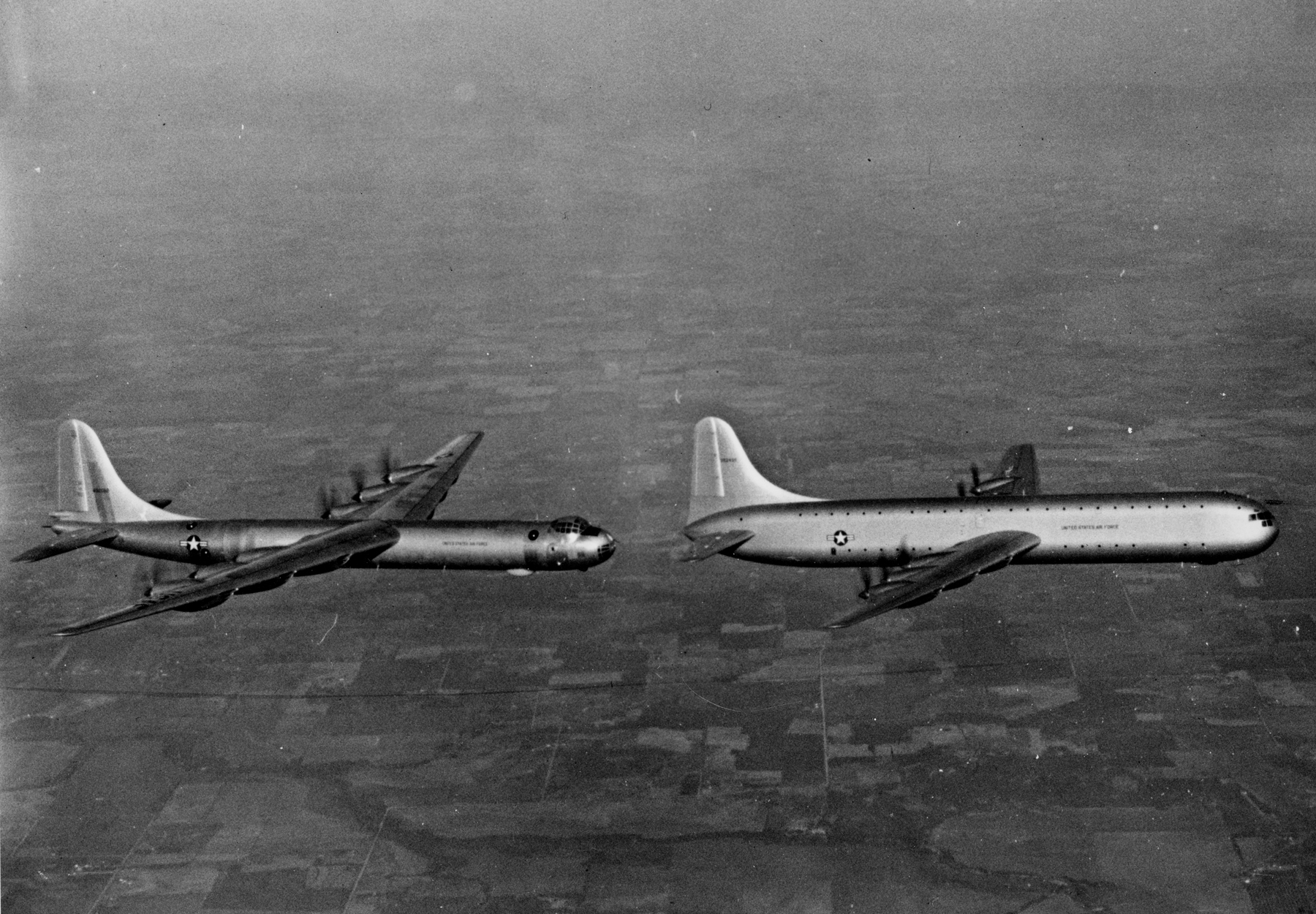
The XC-99 in flight with a B-36B – the aircraft type it was developed from

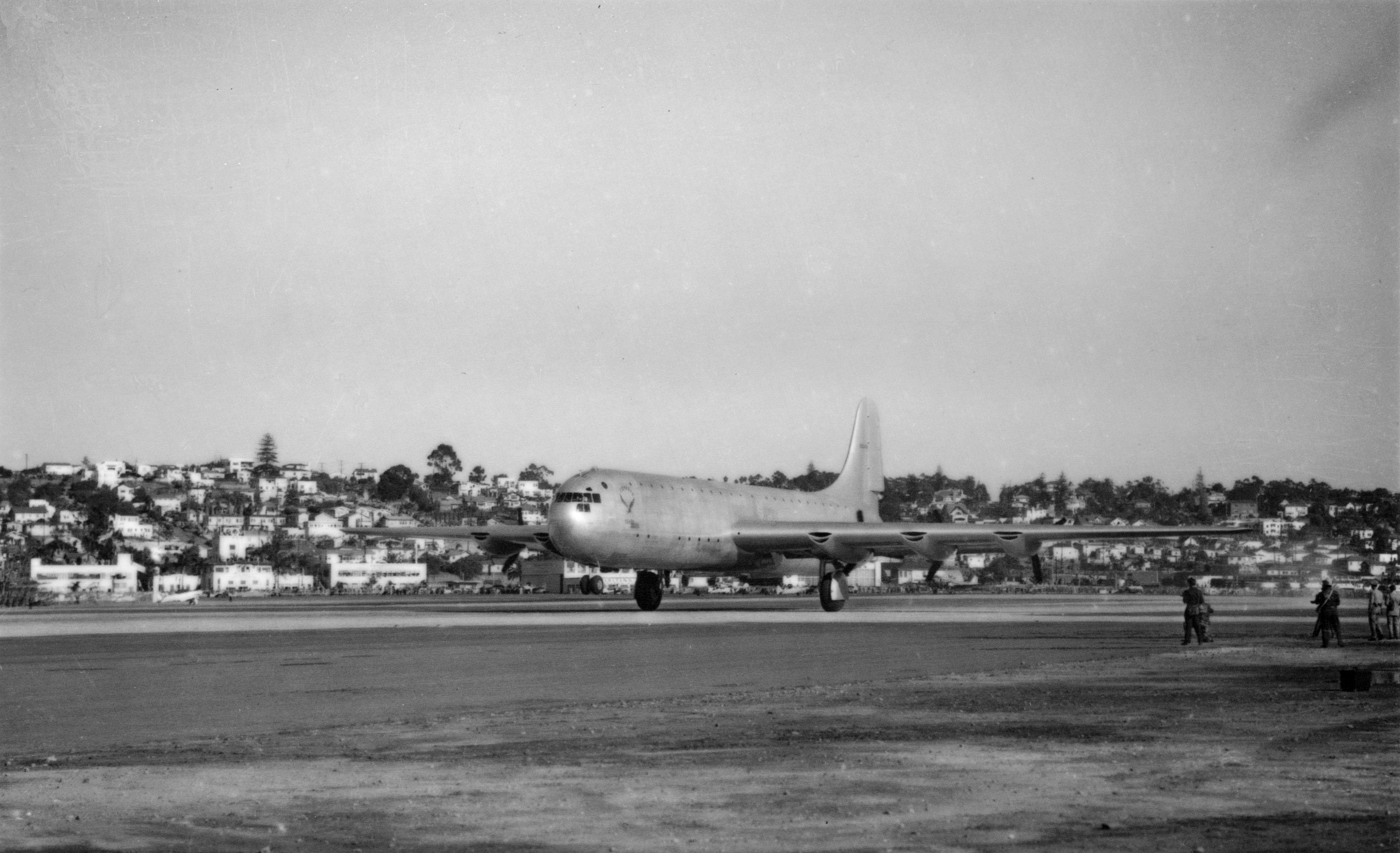
The XC-99 landing during flight test trial

In July 1950, the XC-99 (AF Ser. No. 43-52436) flew its first cargo mission, "Operation Elephant". It transported 101,266 pounds (45,933 kg) of cargo, including engines and propellers for the B-36, from San Diego to Kelly Air Force Base in San Antonio, Texas, a record it would later break when it lifted 104,000 lb (47,200 kg) from an airfield at 5,000 ft (1,500 m) elevation. In 1951, the aircraft was retrofitted with 3,800hp Pratt & Whitney R-4360-53 engines, landing gear was strengthened and a cargo-loading system installed, including an internal elevator. Bins were developed to enable quick loading of the aircraft - it was estimated the aircraft could be loaded in as little as 30 minutes.

In August 1953, the XC-99 would make its longest flight, 12,000 mi (19,000 km), to Rhein-Main Air Base, Germany, by way of Kindley Air Force Base, Bermuda and Lajes Field in the Azores. It carried more than 60,000 lb (27,000 kg) each way. It attracted much attention everywhere it flew. The US Air Force determined that it had no need for such a large, long-range transport at that time, and no more were ordered. The sole XC-99 served until 1957, including much use during the Korean War. It made twice weekly trips from Kelly AFB to the aircraft depot at McClellan Air Force Base, California, transporting supplies and parts for the B-36 bomber while returning by way of other bases or depots making pick-ups and deliveries along the way.

== Retirement and preservation ==
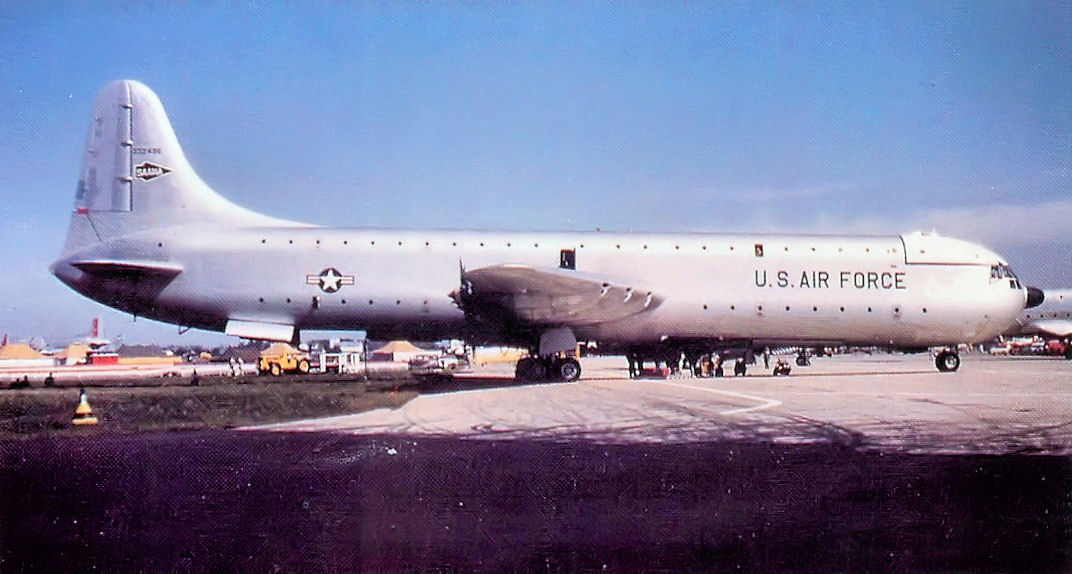
XC-99 at Kelly AFB, Texas while attached to the Military Air Transport Service 1700th Air Transport Group, 1954. Note San Antonio Air Materiel Area (SAAMA) tail marking, indicating the aircraft was assigned to the Air Materiel Command.

The aircraft was put on display at Kelly AFB near San Antonio, Texas, in 1957. Deterioration of the airframe due to the high magnesium content was beyond local abilities to address. The aircraft was later moved to a grassy field near the base and in 1993 the USAF moved it back to the Kelly AFB. In 1995, Kelly AFB was identified for closure via BRAC, although some portions would remain under USAF control as the Kelly Field Annex to adjacent Lackland AFB, it was deemed that a new location be identified for the XC-99.

Disassembly of the aircraft began at Kelly Field in April 2004 and the airframe was moved in pieces from Kelly to the National Museum of the United States Air Force (NMUSAF) at Wright-Patterson Air Force Base. By the summer of 2008, the transfer was complete and the parts were lying outside the museum. The aircraft had continued to suffer additional corrosion during its years in Texas and was found to be in worse condition than expected, with the restoration task being beyond the resources of the museum in a realistic time scale. Some major components such as the wing spar would need to be completely replaced.

The NMUSAF's plans for the restoration and display of the XC-99 are displayed in a case with a 1:72 scale model made by Lt Col Howard T. Meek, USAF (Ret).

In an effort to preserve the aircraft for future restoration, the XC-99 was later moved incrementally to the 309th Aerospace Maintenance and Regeneration Group (309 AMARG) storage facility at Davis–Monthan Air Force Base, in Tucson, Arizona, where it will remain, in an area containing other aircraft belonging to the NMUSAF until the museum is able to restore it. In 2014, Lieutenant General John L. Hudson, USAF (Ret), director of the NMUSAF said that there would be insufficient resources for restoration for the foreseeable future.

== Specifications (XC-99) ==
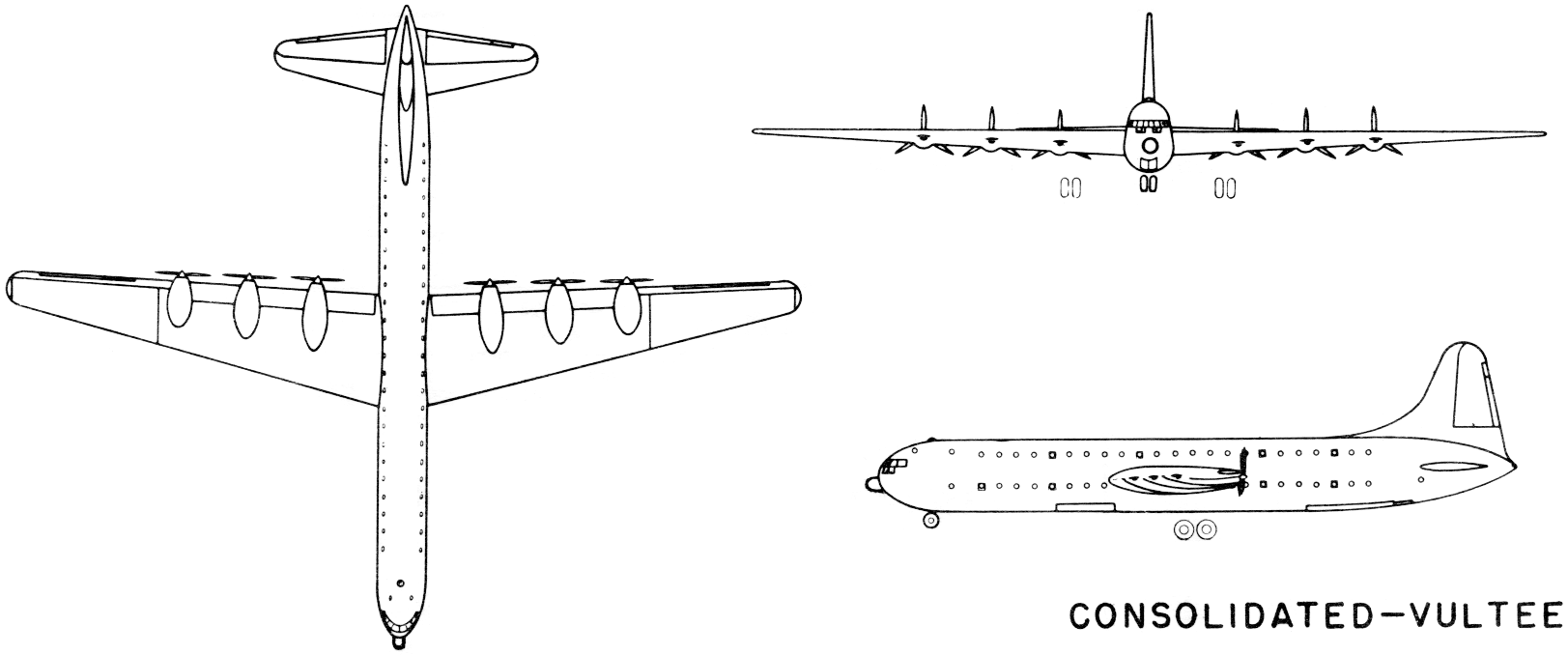
3-view line drawing of the Convair XC-99

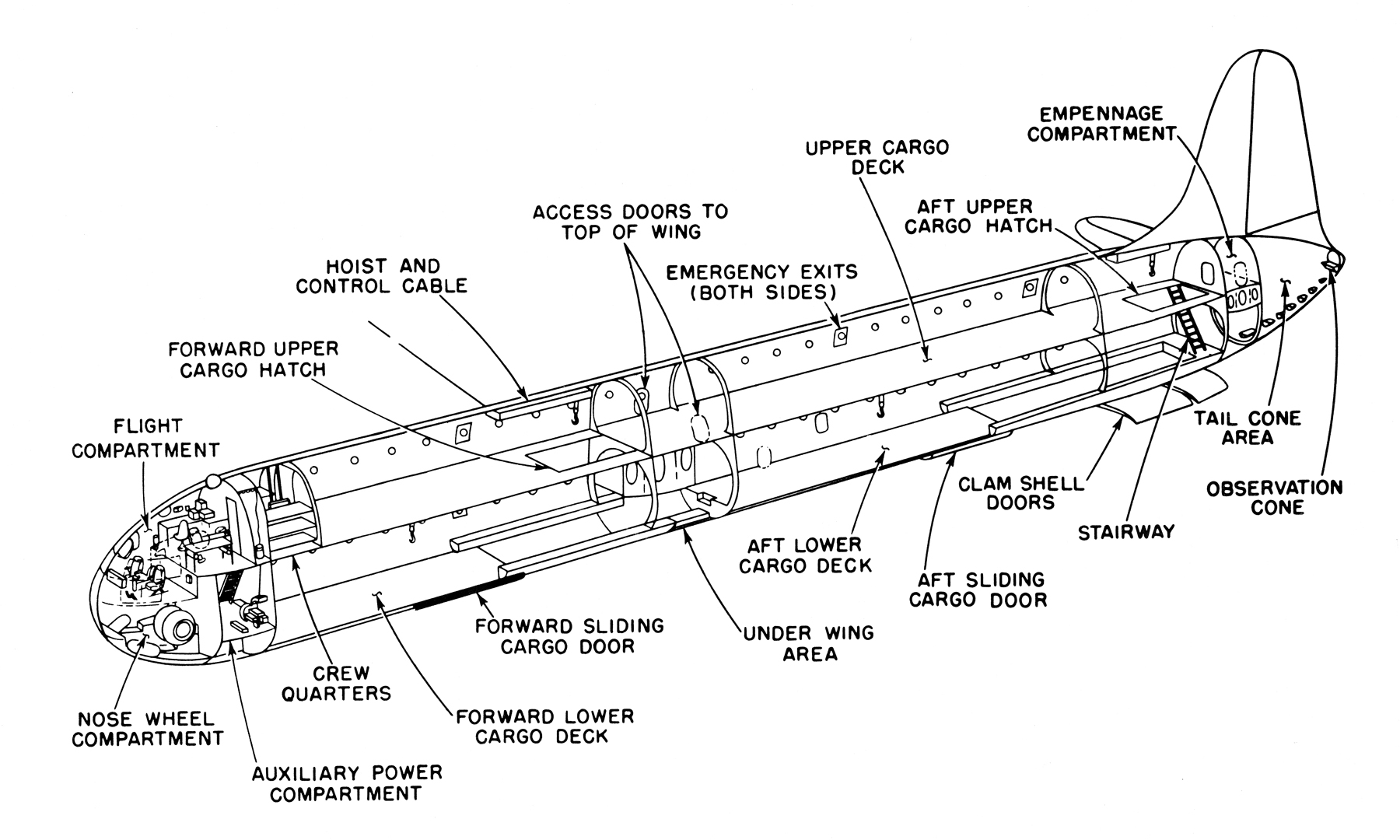
Convair XC-99 interior details

Data from General Dynamics Aircraft and their Predecessors

General characteristics

- Crew: 5 (with a relief crew of 5)
- Capacity: up to 400 troops / 100,000 lb (45,000 kg) cargo
- Length: 182 ft 6 in (55.63 m)
- Wingspan: 230 ft 0 in (70.10 m)
- Height: 57 ft 6 in (17.53 m)
- Wing area: 4,772 sq ft (443.3 m^{2})
- Airfoil: root: NACA 63(420)-422; tip: NACA 63(420)-517
- Empty weight: 135,232 lb (61,340 kg)
- Gross weight: 265,000 lb (120,202 kg)
- Max takeoff weight: 320,000 lb (145,150 kg)
- Fuel capacity: 19,112 US gal (15,914 imp gal; 72,350 L)
- Powerplant: 6 × Pratt & Whitney R-4360-41 Wasp Major 28-cylinder air-cooled radial piston engine, 3,500 hp (2,600 kW) each
- Propellers: 3-bladed Curtiss-Electric constant-speed fully-feathering pusher propellers

Performance

- Maximum speed: 307 mph (494 km/h, 267 kn)
- Range: 8,100 mi (13,000 km, 7,000 nmi) with 19,112 US gal (15,914 imp gal; 72,350 L) and 10,000 lb (4,500 kg) payload

Avionics

- Weather radar

== See also ==
Related development

- Convair B-36 – US Air Force strategic bomber (1949–1959)

Aircraft of comparable role, configuration, and era

- Bristol Brabazon – British propeller-driven large airliner prototype
- Lockheed R6V Constitution – Transport aircraft
- Saunders-Roe Princess – British 1952 airliner flying boat

Related lists

- List of military aircraft of the United States
