= UUM-125 Sea Lance =

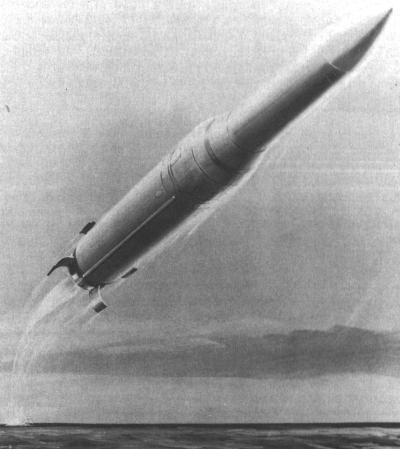
- Artist concept
- Type: Standoff Anti-Submarine
- Place of origin: United States

Service history
- Used by: United States Navy

Production history
- Manufacturer: Boeing
- Produced: Cancelled, 1990

Specifications
- Mass: 1,400 kg (3,086 pounds)
- Length: 6.25 m (20 ft 6 in)
- Diameter: 53.3 cm (21.0 in) (capsule diameter)
- Detonation mechanism: RUM/UUM-125A; W89 thermonuclear RUM/UUM-125B; Mark 50 homing torpedo
- Engine: Hercules EX 116 MOD 0 solid-fuel rocket
- Operational range: UUM-125A; 185 kilometres (100 nautical miles); UUM-125B; 65 kilometres (35 nautical miles)
- Maximum speed: Mach 1.5
- Guidance system: Mk 117 digital fire-control system
- Launch platform: Submarines • Los Angeles class • Seawolf class Surface Warships • Ticonderoga class • Spruance class • Arleigh Burke class

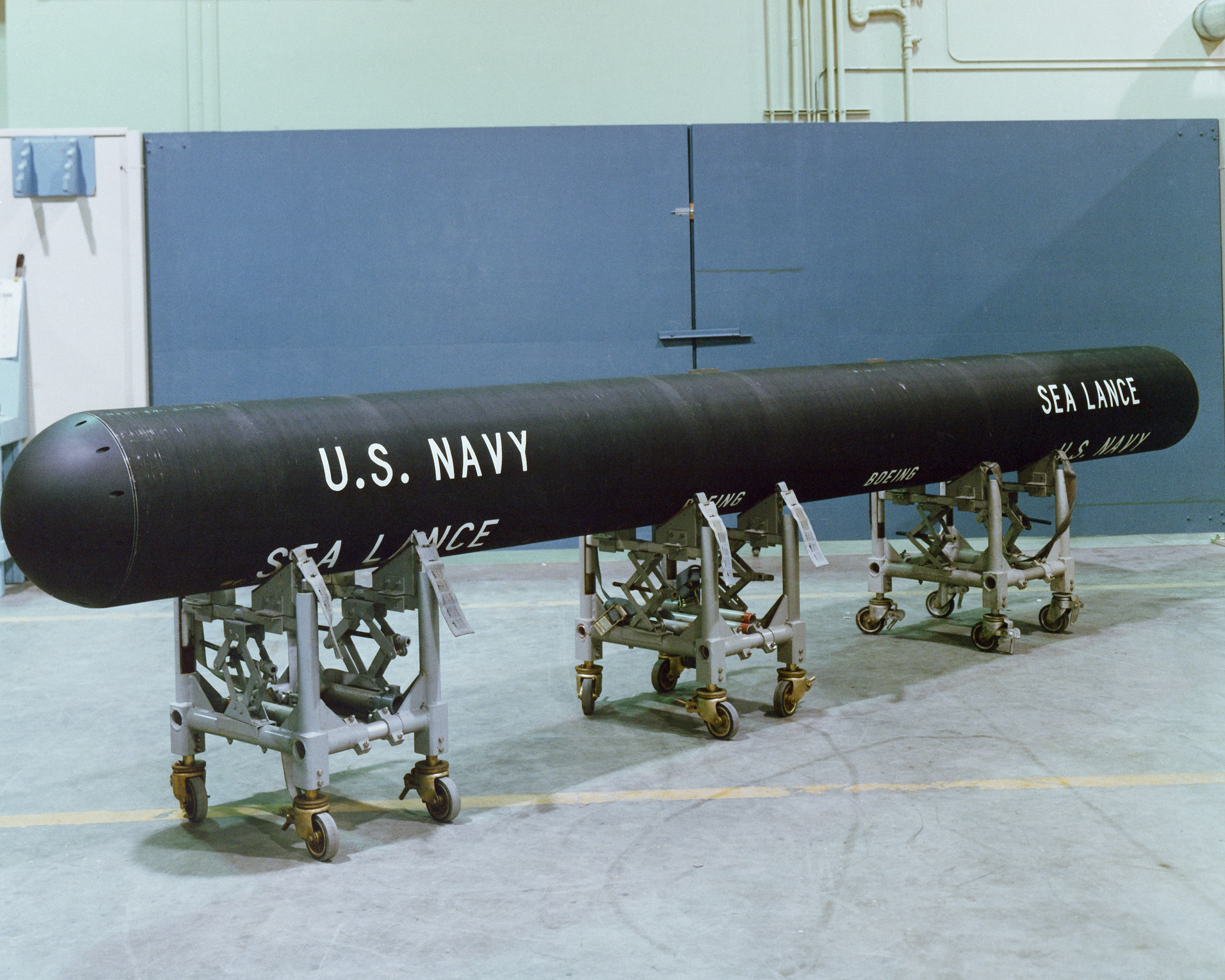
Sea Lance in-service capsule

The UUM-125 Sea Lance, known early in development as the Common ASW Standoff Weapon, was to be an American standoff anti-submarine missile, initially intended to carry a W89 thermonuclear warhead. It was conceived in 1980 as a successor to both the UUM-44 SUBROC and RUR-5 ASROC anti-submarine missiles. The Sea Lance was to be available in two versions, known as UUM-125A and RUM-125A. The former would be a submarine-launched version, the latter surface-launched. It was cancelled in 1990 as its importance was obviated by the collapse of the Soviet Union.

== Design and development ==
In 1982, Boeing was awarded the main contract to develop the system, named the Sea Lance. By the following year, it had become apparent that developing two different versions of the missile was too ambitious, and further development of the RUM-125 was suspended. The RUM-139, a vertical-launch model of the ASROC, was developed as a stopgap weapon in this role.

The Sea Lance was to be housed inside a watertight capsule which could be launched from an ordinary 21 inch torpedo tube. The Mk 117 digital fire-control system provided targeting information to the missile prior to launch. After being fired, the capsule would float to the surface where the rocket would ignite and its fins would deploy. An inertial guidance system would direct the missile to the general location of the target. Initial plans were to have the surface-launched version operate in a similar manner: launched from the Mk 41 vertical launching system. When the missile reached the intended area, the payload would separate from the missile, then deploy a parachute to decelerate the warhead or torpedo. Both missiles were initially planned to carry a depth charge with a 200 kiloton W89 thermonuclear warhead. Such a yield would have given the missile a lethal radius against submarines of around 10 kilometres (6.2 mi). This massive warhead, combined with the fact that the target would be unable to detect the missile until the payload hit the water, made it virtually impossible for a target to escape.

In the mid-1980s, a conventional variant of this missile was proposed which would carry the new Mark 50 torpedo submarine-seeking weapon. This version was dubbed the UUM-125B.

A contract for the full-scale development of the Sea Lance was awarded in 1986. In 1988, it was decided to proceed again with the surface-launched RUM-125 version. The nuclear warhead was canceled in favor of a purely conventional missile. In 1990, the entire program was canceled as a result of the collapse of the Soviet Union. Today the U.S. Navy attack submarines do not have any long-range supersonic stand-off anti-submarine weapon, while U.S. Navy surface warships do have the new RUM-139 VL-ASROC.

== Gallery ==
UUM-125 Sea Lance
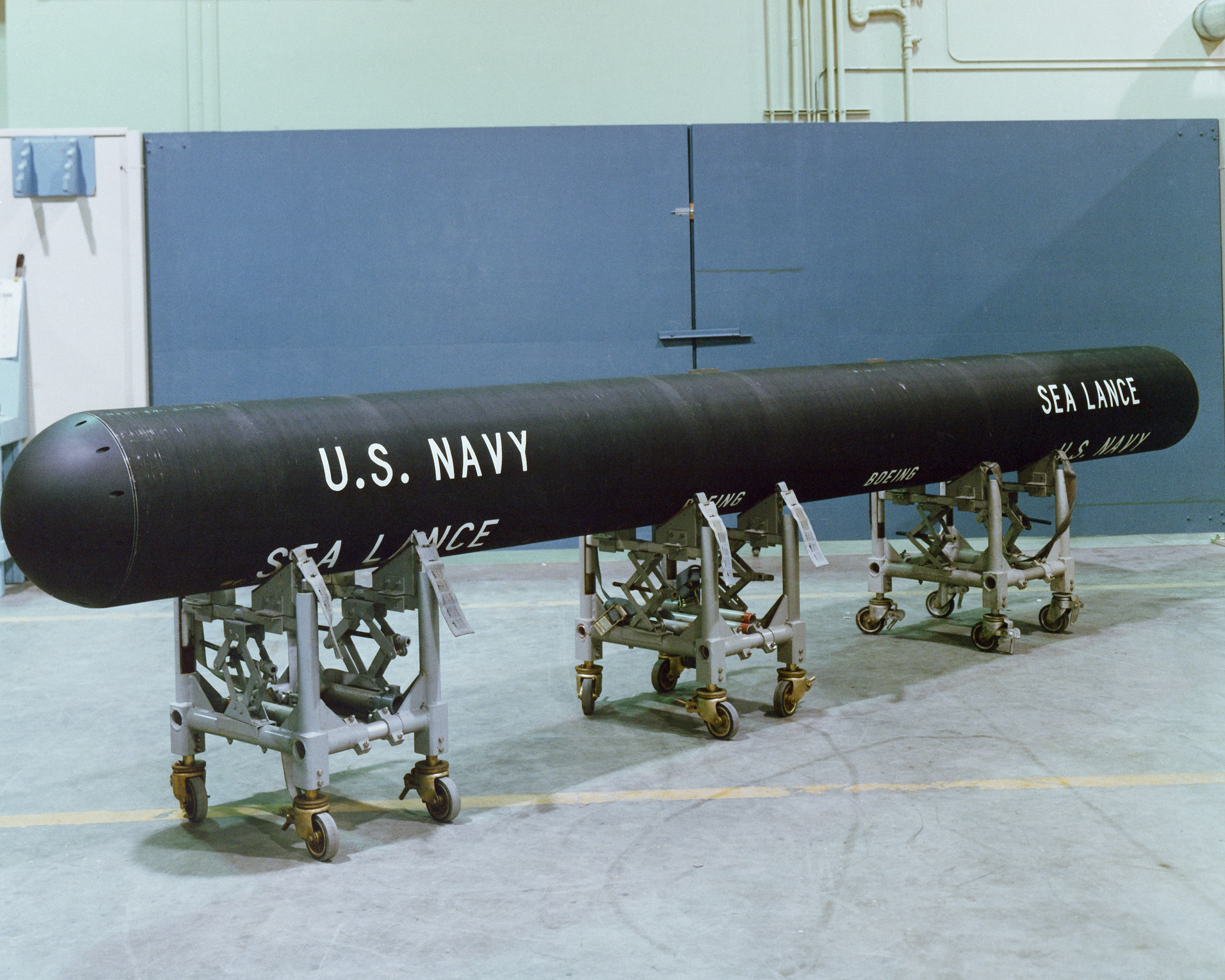
Sea Lance in-service capsule

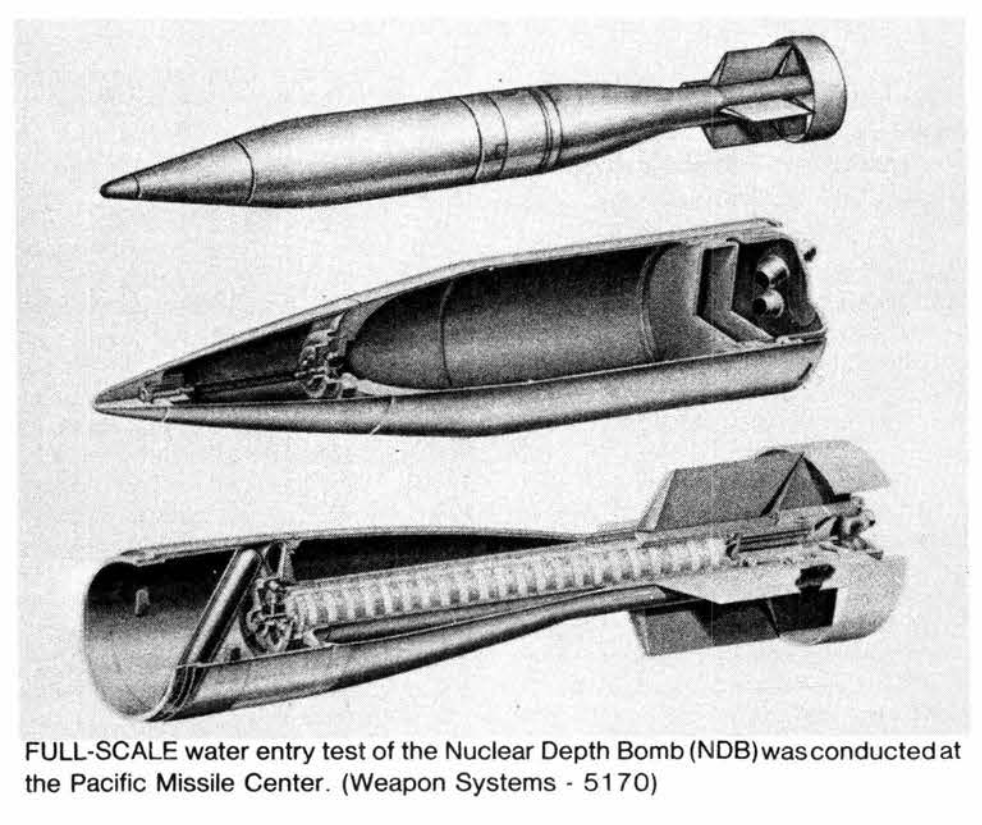
Depth bomb shell. The W89 warhead would be fitted to this device.

== See also ==
- RUM-139 VL-ASROC – (United States)
- RUR-5 ASROC – (United States)
- UGM-89 Perseus – (United States)
- UUM-44 SUBROC – (United States)
- RPK-2 Vyuga – (Soviet Union)
- Ikara (missile) – (Australia)
- SMART (missile) – (India)

== Suggested Reading ==
- Polmar, Norman (1993). The Naval Institute Guide to the Ships and Aircraft of the U.S. Fleet (15th ed.). Annapolis, MD: Naval Institute Press. ISBN 1-55750675-2.
