= Daniel Michael Tellep =

American corporate executive (1931–2020)

Daniel M. Tellep
- Born: November 20, 1931
- Died: November 26, 2020 (aged 89)
- Education: University of California, Berkeley (B.S., M.S.); Harvard Business School
- Occupation: Aerospace businessman
- Employer: Lockheed Corporation / Lockheed Martin
- Known for: Proposing the 1994 merger that formed Lockheed Martin

Daniel Michael Tellep (20 November 1931 – 26 November 2020) was an American aerospace businessman. He died on November 26, 2020. He was CEO and chairman of the board of Lockheed Corporation from 1989 to 1995, and CEO of Lockheed Martin Corporation in 1996. Tellep joined Lockheed in 1955 and was President of Lockheed Missiles & Space Company Inc., a wholly owned subsidiary of Lockheed, from 1984 to 1988. He was group president-missiles and space systems from 1986 to 1988. Tellep was chairman of the board of Lockheed Martin Corporation (Aerospace Industry) until 1996. Tellep was Director of Wells Fargo Bank National Association of WFC Holdings Corporation and has been its Director since 1996. He was Director of First Interstate Bancorp since 1991. He was a Director of Edison International, Scecorp and Southern California Edison Company, a subsidiary of Edison International since 1992. Tellep held two degrees from the University of California, Berkeley (B.S. in Mechanical Engineering in 1954 and M.S. in 1955) and has completed studies at Harvard Business School.

In 1979, Tellep was elected to the National Academy of Engineering for his "Pioneering theoretical, experimental, and design contributions in the development of re-entry systems for U.S. Fleet Ballistic Missiles."

It was Tellep who, in 1994, proposed the merger which resulted in the formation of Lockheed Martin.

== Additional sources ==
- "Mr. Daniel M. Tellep, Mechanical Engineering". Silicon Valley Engineering Hall of Fame for 1994. Archived from the original on February 5, 2007.
