= Courtlandt S. Gross =

American aviation executive (1904–1982)

- Born: November 21, 1904; Boston, Massachusetts
- Died: July 15, 1982 (aged 77); Villanova, Pennsylvania
- Education: St. George's School ('23); Harvard University (AB '27)
- Spouse: Alexandra Van Rensselaer Devereux (m. 1939)

Courtlandt Sherrington Gross (November 21, 1904 – July 15, 1982) was an American aviation pioneer and executive who served as a leading officer of Lockheed Corporation for 35 years. He retired as chairman in 1967.

== Life and career ==
Gross was born in Boston, Massachusetts, and attended Harvard University. He and his brother Robert E. Gross purchased the company Lockheed Corporation in 1932 and built it into an aerospace conglomerate.

Gross, his wife Alexandra Van Rensselaer Devereux Gross, and their housekeeper Catherine O'Hara VanderVeur were murdered in their home in Villanova, Pennsylvania. Drifter Roger P. Buehl was convicted of the murders.
