= Robert E. Gross (businessman) =

American businessman

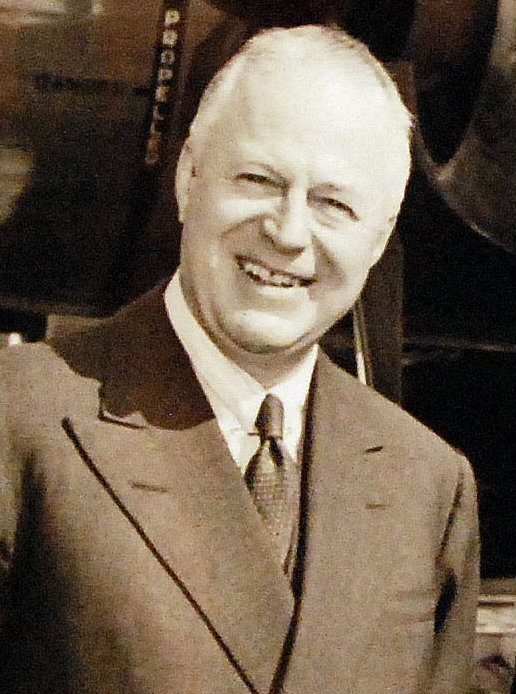
- Gross in 1953.
- Born: May 11, 1897; Newton, Massachusetts, U.S.
- Died: September 3, 1961 (aged 64); Los Angeles, California, U.S.
- Parents: Robert Haven Gross (father); Mabel Bowman Bell (mother)

Robert Ellsworth Gross (May 11, 1897 – September 3, 1961) was an American businessman involved in the field of aviation. His first venture, the Viking Flying Boat Company, failed with the loss of the aircraft market brought on by the Great Depression. He was also credited with naming Bell Aircraft’s P-39 as the “AiraCobra”.

== Biography ==
Gross was born in Newton, Massachusetts. He attended St. George's School in Middletown, Rhode Island and graduated in 1915. He attended Harvard where he was elected captain of the ice hockey team in his senior year. In 1932, a group of investors led by Robert and his brother Courtlandt S. Gross bought the Lockheed Aircraft Company from the bankrupt Detroit Aircraft Corporation, renaming it the Lockheed Aircraft Corporation. Robert Gross served as the corporation's president from 1934 to 1956.

Gross bet the future of the struggling new company on the (for its time) very advanced all-metal, retractable Model 10, named the Electra. This design, and its numerous descendants, came to dominate the light transport market in the 1930s and was used in numerous record-setting flights. The Electra placed Lockheed in a strong competitive position, and from 1937 the company mass-produced P-38 Lightning fighters and, from 1943, Constellation airliners, along with numerous other types.

Gross died from pancreatic cancer at the age of 64.

== Legacy ==
In the 2004 film The Aviator, the character of Robert Gross appeared in a brief scene, played by Brent Spiner.

== Sources ==
- National Aviation Hall of Fame
