= UGM-89 Perseus =

UGM-89A Perseus
- Type: Standoff Anti-Submarine & Anti-ship
- Place of origin: United States

Service history
- Used by: United States Navy

Production history
- Manufacturer: Lockheed Missiles and Space Company
- Produced: Cancelled, 1973

Specifications
- Mass: 6,000 lb (2,700 kg)
- Length: 25 ft (7.6 m)
- Diameter: 30 in (760 mm)
- Warhead: Homing torpedo
- Engine: Solid propellant rocket motor
- Operational range: 30 nmi (35 mi; 56 km)
- Launch platform: Submarine

The UGM-89 Perseus was a proposed U.S. Navy submarine-launched anti-ship (AShM) and anti-submarine (ASW) cruise missile that was developed under the Submarine Tactical Missile (STAM) project, which was also referred to as the Submarine Anti-ship Weapon System (STAWS). This missile system was to be the centerpiece for a proposed third-generation nuclear-powered cruise missile submarine championed by then-Vice Admiral Hyman G. Rickover, the influential but controversial head of the Navy's nuclear propulsion program.

== Development ==
The Navy issued the STAM requirement in March 1969, and the Lockheed Missiles and Space Company (LMSC) responded to this proposal, which included the formation of an undersea warfare program organization in Sunnyvale, California. It is unclear if this was to be an entirely new organization or part of the Lockheed Underwater Missile Facility (LUMF) which had been responsible for the design and development of the Polaris, Poseidon, and Trident submarine-launched strategic ballistic missile (SLBM) systems for the U.S. Navy. In February 1970, the missile designation ZUGM-89A Perseus was reserved for the U.S. Navy presumably for the STAM/STAWS missile development program.

== Design overview ==
Because of its large size, the UGM-89 Perseus missile could not be launched from the Navy's standard 21 in (530 mm) submarine torpedo tubes, but would be carried in a vertical launching system (VLS) housed within the proposed cruise missile submarine's hull. Twenty VLS tubes would be located in a separate compartment situated between the submarine's operations and reactor compartments. The individual launcher tube would be 30 by 300 inches (76 cm × 762 cm) in dimension. The missile warhead payload would be a new 21-inch (533 mm) diameter homing torpedo to be developed concurrently with the UGM-89 Perseus missile.

By 1971, the STAM project had evolved into a long-range Advanced Cruise Missile (ACM) program capable of undertaking a variety of combat missions, including strategic nuclear strike (see table below). The proposed ACM versions of the UGM-89 Perseus STAM would use a slightly enlarged launch tube (40 in × 400 in (100 cm × 1,020 cm), and 1979 would have been the date for its initial operational capability (IOC).

1971 ACM Alternatives	High-Subsonic Anti-ship/AShW	Supersonic Anti-ship/AShW	Strategic Nuclear Strike
Dimensions	34 x 336 inches (86.36 x 853.4 cm)	34 x 340 inches (86.36 x 863.6 cm)	34 x 336 inches (86.36 x 853.4 cm)
Overall launch weight	8,600 lbs. (3,900.9 kg)	11,420 lbs. (5,180.0 kg)	9,950 lbs. (4,13.2 kg)
Without booster	6,183 lbs. (2,804.6 kg)	7.519 lbs. (3,410.6 kg)	———
Warhead	1,000 lb. armour piercing (453.6 kg)	700 lb. (317.6 kg)	260 lb. (117.9 kg)
Speed	Mach 0.8 (609 mph or 980 km/h)	Mach 2.0 (1,522 mph or 2450 km/h)	Mach 0.8 (609 mph or 980 km/h)
Range	400 nm (740.8 km)	400 nm (740.8 km)	1800 nm (3,333.6 km)

== Cancellation ==
The UGM-89 Perseus missile system was cancelled in 1973, and its proposed nuclear-powered cruise missile submarine platform was officially cancelled in 1974, with the Navy deciding to build the less expensive Los Angeles-class nuclear-powered attack submarines, which would subsequently carry both the Harpoon anti-ship missile and Tomahawk cruise missiles. The ASW component of the UGM-89 Perseus would later serve as the baseline for the proposed Sea Lance stand-off ASW missile system, which would also be cancelled.

== See also ==
- BGM-109 Tomahawk
- RUR-5 ASROC
- UGM-84 Harpoon
- UUM-44 SUBROC
- UUM-125 Sea Lance
