= 1855 =

1855 in various calendars
- Gregorian calendar: 1855; MDCCCLV
- Ab urbe condita: 2608
- Armenian calendar: 1304; ԹՎ ՌՅԴ
- Assyrian calendar: 6605
- Baháʼí calendar: 11–12
- Balinese saka calendar: 1776–1777
- Bengali calendar: 1261–1262
- Berber calendar: 2805
- British Regnal year: 18 Vict. 1 – 19 Vict. 1
- Buddhist calendar: 2399
- Burmese calendar: 1217
- Byzantine calendar: 7363–7364
- Chinese calendar: 甲寅年 (Wood Tiger); 4552 or 4345 — to — 乙卯年 (Wood Rabbit); 4553 or 4346
- Coptic calendar: 1571–1572
- Discordian calendar: 3021
- Ethiopian calendar: 1847–1848
- Hebrew calendar: 5615–5616
- Hindu calendars
- Vikram Samvat: 1911–1912
- Shaka Samvat: 1776–1777
- Kali Yuga: 4955–4956
- Holocene calendar: 11855
- Igbo calendar: 855–856
- Iranian calendar: 1233–1234
- Islamic calendar: 1271–1272
- Japanese calendar: Ansei 2 (安政２年)
- Javanese calendar: 1783–1784
- Julian calendar: Gregorian minus 12 days
- Korean calendar: 4188
- Minguo calendar: 57 before ROC 民前57年
- Nanakshahi calendar: 387
- Thai solar calendar: 2397–2398
- Tibetan calendar: ཤིང་ཕོ་སྟག་ལོ་ (male Wood-Tiger); 1981 or 1600 or 828 — to — ཤིང་མོ་ཡོས་ལོ་ (female Wood-Hare); 1982 or 1601 or 829

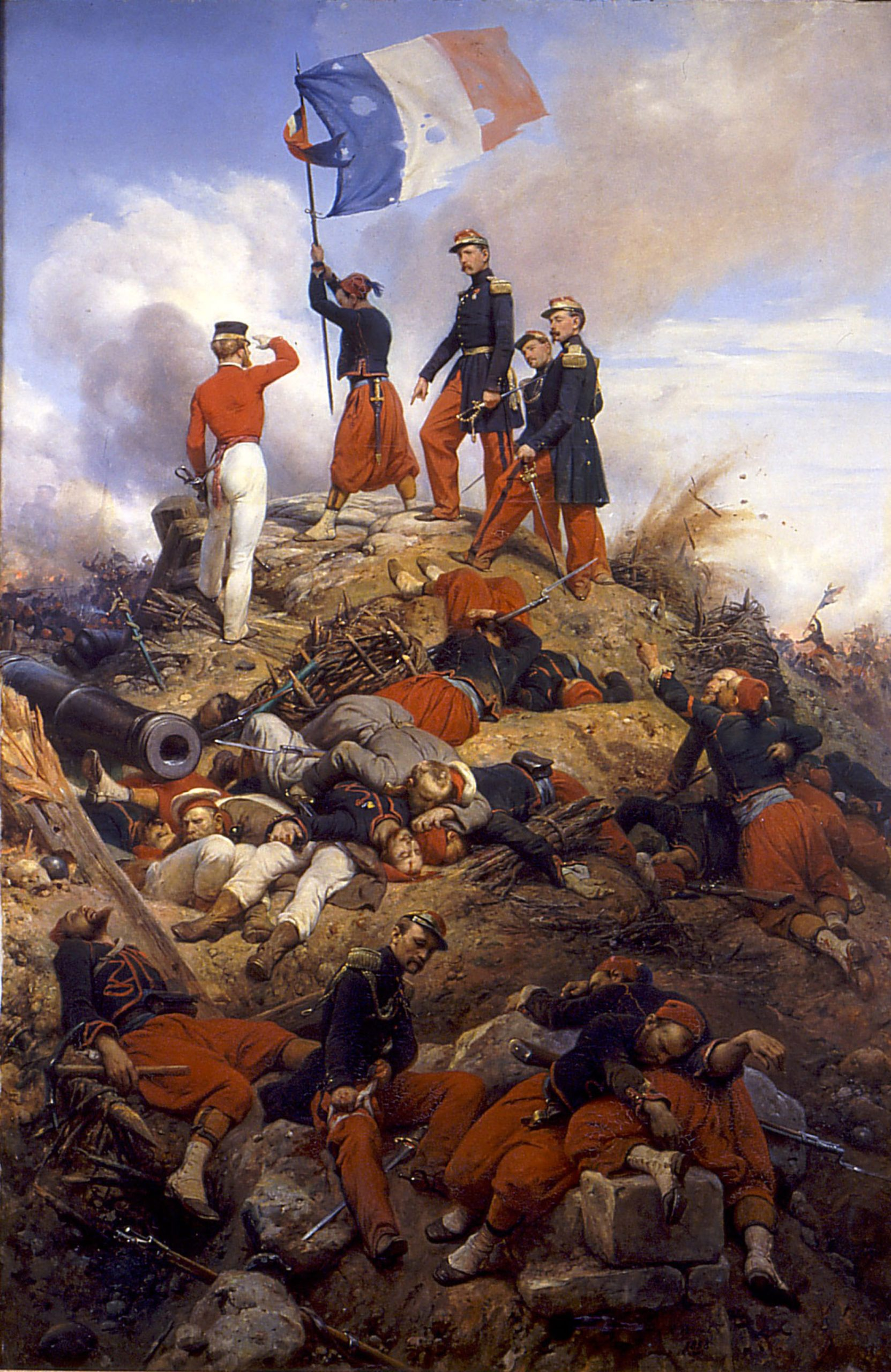
September 9: French and British forces capture Sevastopol in Battle of Malakoff

1855 (MDCCCLV) was a common year starting on Monday of the Gregorian calendar and a common year starting on Saturday of the Julian calendar, the 1855th year of the Common Era (CE) and Anno Domini (AD) designations, the 855th year of the 2nd millennium, the 55th year of the 19th century, and the 6th year of the 1850s decade. As of the start of 1855, the Gregorian calendar was 12 days ahead of the Julian calendar, which remained in localized use until 1923.

== Events ==
=== January–March ===
- January 1 – Ottawa, Ontario, is incorporated as a city.
- January 5 – Ramón Castilla begins his third term as President of Peru.
- January 23
  - The first bridge over the Mississippi River opens in modern-day Minneapolis, a predecessor of the Father Louis Hennepin Bridge.
  - The 8.2–8.3 M_{w} Wairarapa earthquake claims between five and nine lives near the Cook Strait area of New Zealand.
- January 26 – The Point No Point Treaty is signed in the Washington Territory.
- January 27 – The Panama Railway becomes the first railroad to connect the Atlantic and Pacific Oceans.
- January 29 – Lord Aberdeen resigns as Prime Minister of the United Kingdom, over the management of the Crimean War.
- February 5 – Lord Palmerston becomes Prime Minister of the United Kingdom.
- February 11 – Kassa Hailu is crowned Tewodros II, Emperor of Ethiopia.
- February 12 – Michigan State University (the "pioneer" land-grant college) is established.
- February 15 – The North Carolina General Assembly incorporates the Western North Carolina Railroad, to build a rail line from Salisbury to the western part of the state.
- February 22 – Pennsylvania State University is founded, as the Farmers' High School of Pennsylvania.
- March 2 – Alexander II ascends the Russian throne, upon the death of his father Nicholas I.
- March 3 – The United States Congress appropriates $30,000 to create the U.S. Camel Corps.
- March 16 – Bates College is founded by abolitionists in Lewiston, Maine.
- March 17 – Taiping Rebellion: A Taiping army of 350,000 invades Anhui.
- March 30 – Elections are held for the first Kansas Territory legislature. Missourian 'Border Ruffians' cross the border in large numbers to elect a pro-slavery body.

=== April–June ===
- April 3 – The Nepalese invasion of Tibet (west of China) to the north across the Himalaya Mountains (tallest and most rugged in the world) starts the Nepalese–Tibetan War (1855–1856).
- April 7 – Battle of Kaba: The Kingdom of Tonga in the islands of the southwest Pacific Ocean (Polynesia, Melanesia / Oceania), intervenes in the war between the self-proclaimed Tui Viti (King) of the island of Fiji, Cakobau, and his rivals the Confederation of Rewa. It results in Rewa's defeat and the tenuous unification of Fiji under Cakobau.
- April 16 – Emperor of the French Napoleon III, with Empress Eugénie, begins a 6-day state visit to Britain.
- April 18 – The Bordeaux Wine Official Classification of 1855, requested by Napoleon III for the Exposition Universelle (opening May 15), first appears.
- May 1 – Van Diemen's Land is separated administratively from the Australian province of New South Wales and granted self-government.
- May 3 – American adventurer William Walker and a group of armed mercenaries (filibusters) sail from San Francisco in California south to Central America to attempt to conquer Nicaragua.
- May 15
  - The Exposition Universelle (an early World's fair) officially opens in Paris (continues to November 15).
  - The Great Gold Robbery is made from a moving train between London Bridge and Folkestone in England, one of the first crimes of its kind.
- May 17 – Mount Sinai Hospital, New York, is dedicated (originally named as the Jews' Hospital) in New York City; it opens to patients on June 5.
- May 22 – In Australia, the province of Victoria (named for then reigning British monarch, Queen Victoria) to the southeast is separated administratively from the earlier larger province of New South Wales to the north.
- June 15 – Stamp duty revenue tax is removed from British newspapers, creating free mass media thereafter in the United Kingdom.
- June 29 – The Daily Telegraph newspaper begins publication in London.

=== July–September ===
- July – Bank of Toronto incorporated in Canada (in 1955 it will merge with The Dominion Bank to become Toronto-Dominion Bank).
- July 1 – The Quinault Treaty, in which the Quinault and Quileute tribes cede their land to the United States, is signed.
- July 2 – The Kansas territorial legislature convenes in Pawnee, and begins passing proslavery laws.
- July 4
  - Thomas Cook escorts his first party of excursionists from England to tour the European continent, travelling via Belgium and enabling the tourists to visit the Paris Exposition.
  - Walt Whitman's poetry collection Leaves of Grass is published in Brooklyn.
- July 16 – The Australian colonies are granted self-governing status by the United Kingdom.
- August 1 – Monte Rosa, the second-highest summit in the Alps, is first ascended.
- August 18 – Queen Victoria of the United Kingdom, with Prince Albert, begins a 10-day state visit to Paris, the first visit of a reigning British monarch to France since 1413. While there, she visits the Exposition Universelle.
- September 3 – The last Bartholomew Fair is held in London, England.
- September 9 (August 28 O.S.) – Crimean War: Siege of Sevastopol (1854–1855) – Sevastopol falls to French and British troops.
- September 27 – Alfred Tennyson reads from his new book Maud and other poems, at a social gathering in the home of Robert and Elizabeth Browning in London; Dante Gabriel Rossetti makes a sketch of him doing so.
- September 29 – The Port of Iloilo in the Philippines is opened to international trade, by Queen Isabella II of Spain. This year also the ports of Sual (modern-day Pangasinan) and Zamboanga City are opened to international trade.

=== October–December ===
- October 17
  - Henry Bessemer files his patent in the United Kingdom for the Bessemer process of steelmaking.
  - Crimean War: Battle of Kinburn – Combined French and British forces subdue Russian shore forts. The successful use of French floating batteries makes this the first use of modern ironclad warships in action.
- October 24 – Van Diemen's Land is officially renamed Tasmania.
- November 17 – Scottish missionary explorer David Livingstone becomes the first European to see Victoria Falls, in modern-day Zambia–Zimbabwe.
- November 15 – The Hejaz rebellion takes place in Hejaz against the Ottoman Empire, triggered by a firman of 1854 against the slave trade, which is condemned by the ulema of Mecca as influenced by Westerners and contrary to Islamic law.
- November 21 – Large-scale Bleeding Kansas violence begins, with events leading to the 'Wakarusa War' between antislavery and proslavery forces.
- November 10 – Henry Wadsworth Longfellow's fictional poem The Song of Hiawatha is published in Boston.
- December 11 – Ignacio Comonfort (1812–1863) becomes President of Mexico.
- December 22 – The Metropolitan Board of Works is established in London.

=== Undated ===
- Samuel Colt incorporates his business as the Colt's Patent Firearms Manufacturing Company and opens a new factory, the Colt Armory, in Hartford, Connecticut.
- The cocaine alkaloid is first isolated by German chemist Friedrich Gaedcke.
- The third plague pandemic breaks out in Yunnan, China. This bubonic plague pandemic eventually spreads to all inhabited continents, and ultimately leads to more than 12 million deaths in India and China (estimated 15 million worldwide) making it one of the deadliest pandemics in history. The pandemic is considered active until 1960.
- Palm oil sales from West Africa to the United Kingdom reach 40,000 tons.

== Births ==
=== January–June ===
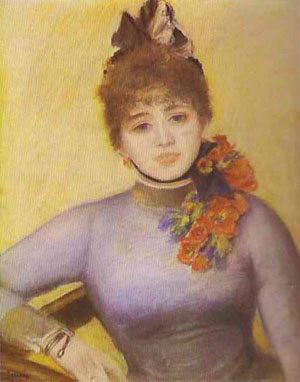
Caroline Rémy de Guebhard (b. April 27)

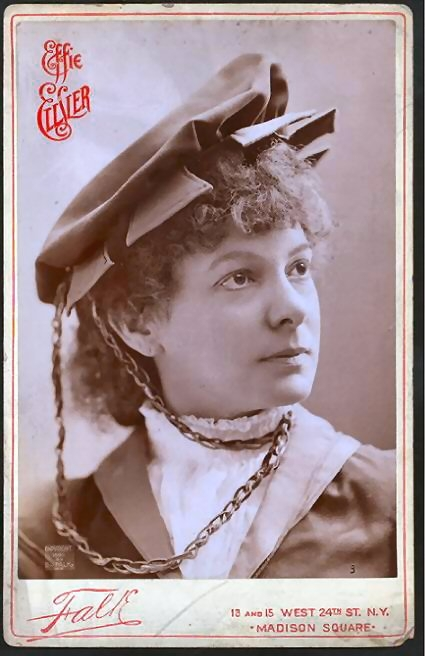
Effie Ellsler (b. September 17)

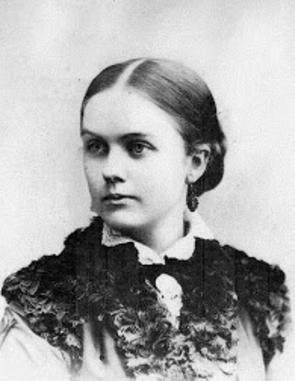
Flora Haines Loughead

- January 5 – King C. Gillette, American razor inventor (d. 1932)
- January 20 – Ernest Chausson, French composer (d. 1899)
- January 21
  - John Browning, American firearms inventor (d. 1926)
  - Henry Jackson, British admiral (d. 1929)
- February 6 – Barbara Galpin, American journalist (d. 1922)
- February 12 – Marie-Anne de Bovet, French writer (d. after 1935)
- February 13 – Paul Deschanel, President of France (d. 1922)
- February 15 – Abraham Grünbaum (activist), German Jewish activist. (d. 1921)
- February 17 – Otto Liman von Sanders, German general (d. 1929)
- February 24 – Johannes von Eben, German general (d. 1924)
- March 4 – Luther Emmett Holt, American pediatrician (d. 1924)
- March 12 – Eduard Birnbaum, Polish-born German cantor (d. 1920)
- March 13 – Percival Lowell, American astronomer (d. 1916)
- March 24 – Andrew Mellon, American banker, philanthropist (d. 1937)
- March 25 – Grace Carew Sheldon, American journalist and businesswoman (d. 1921)
- March 29 – James O. Barrows, American stage and screen actor (d.1925)
- April 9
  - Pavlos Kountouriotis, Greek admiral, 2-time president (d. 1935)
  - John Marden, Australian headmaster, pioneer of women's education (d. 1924)
- April 21 – Hardy Richardson, American baseball player (d. 1931)
- April 23 – Marco Fidel Suárez, 9th President of Colombia (d. 1927)
- April 27 – Caroline Rémy de Guebhard, French feminist (d. 1929)
- April 28 – Mario Nicolis di Robilant, Italian general (d. 1943)
- May 1 – Marie Corelli, English novelist (d. 1924)
- May 7 – Frédéric-Georges Herr, French general (d. 1932)
- May 8 – Bohuslav Brauner, Czech chemist (d. 1935)
- May 9 – Julius Röntgen, German-Dutch classical composer (d. 1932)
- May 10 – Swami Sri Yukteswar Giri, Bengali yogi, author of The Holy Science (d. 1936)
- May 21
  - Émile Verhaeren, Belgian poet (d. 1916)
  - Ella Stewart Udall, American telegraphist (d. 1937)
- May 23 – Isabella Ford, English socialist, feminist, trade unionist and writer (d. 1924)
- May 28 – Emilio Estrada Carmona, 18th President of Ecuador (d. 1911)
- June 1 – Edward Angle, American dentist (d. 1930)
- June 2 – Archibald Berkeley Milne, British admiral (d. 1938)
- June 14 – Robert M. La Follette, American politician (d. 1925)
- June 18 – Alice Sudduth Byerly, American temperance activist (d. 1904)
- June 28 – Theodor Reuss, German occultist (d. 1923)

=== July–December ===
- July 26 – Ferdinand Tönnies, German sociologist (d. 1936)
- August 25 – Hugo von Pohl, German admiral (d. 1916)
- August 28 – Alexander Bethell, British admiral (d. 1932)
- August 31 – Vsevolod Rudnev, Russian admiral (d. 1913)
- September 5 – Henry Victor Deligny, French general (d. 1938)
- September 8 – Marieta de Veintemilla, Ecuadorian first lady, women's rights activist (d. 1907)
- September 9 – Houston Stewart Chamberlain, British-born German writer (d. 1927)
- September 15 – Orishatukeh Faduma, Guyana-born African-American Christian missionary, educator and advocate for African culture (d. 1946)
- September 17 – Effie Ellsler, American actress (d. 1942)
- September 25 – James P. Parker, United States Navy commodore (d. 1942)
- October 10 – Eduard von Capelle, German admiral (d. 1931)
- October 12 – Arthur Nikisch, Hungarian conductor (d. 1922)
- November 1 – Templin Potts, American naval officer; 11th Naval Governor of Guam (d. 1927)
- November 5
  - Léon Teisserenc de Bort, French meteorologist (d. 1913)
  - Eugene V. Debs, American union leader (d. 1926)
- November 6 – E. S. Gosney, American philanthropist, eugenicist (d. 1942)
- November 8 – Nikolaos Triantafyllakos, Prime Minister of Greece (d. 1939)
- December 16 – Alice Mary Dowd, American educator, poet (d. 1943)
- December 29 – William Thompson Sedgwick, American teacher, epidemiologist and bacteriologist (d. 1921)

=== Date unknown ===
- Florence Huntley, American humorist and occult author (d. 1912)
- Flora Haines Loughead, American miner; mother of Allan Lockheed, founder of Lockheed aerospace company (d. 1943)
- Katharine A. O'Keeffe O'Mahoney, Irish-born American teacher of poetry to Robert Frost (d. 1918)

== Deaths ==
=== January–June ===
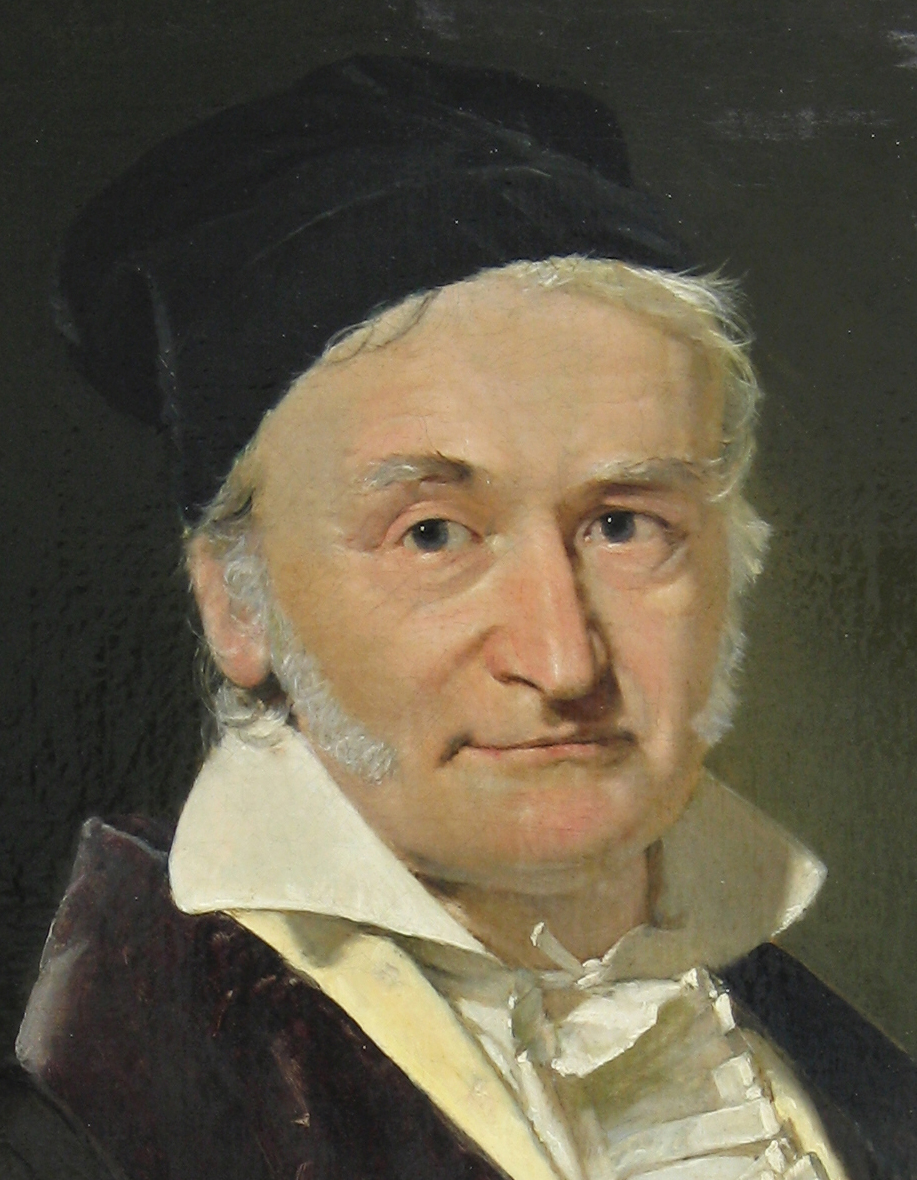
Carl Friedrich Gauss (d. February 23)

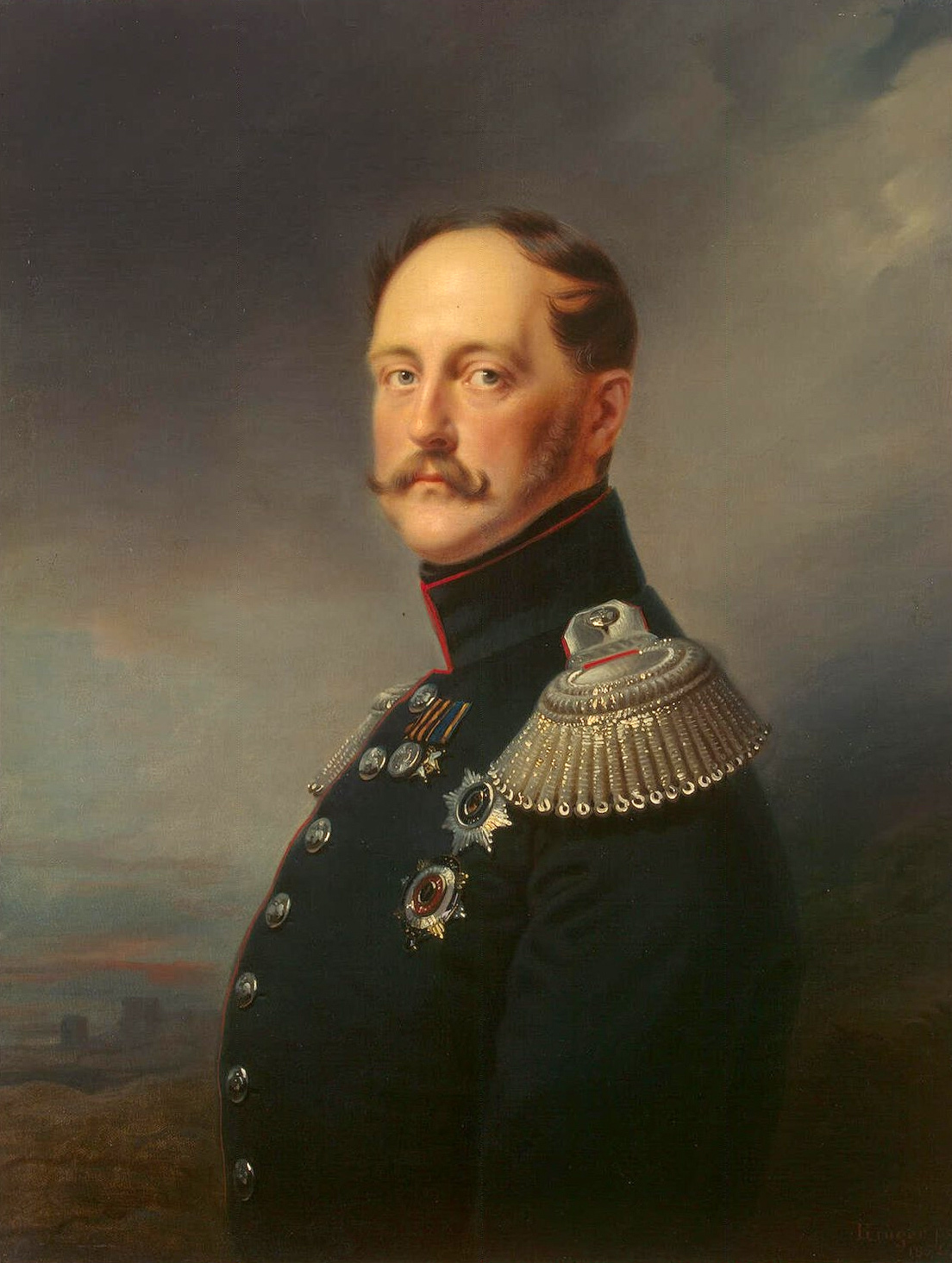
Tsar Nicholas I of Russia (d. March 2)

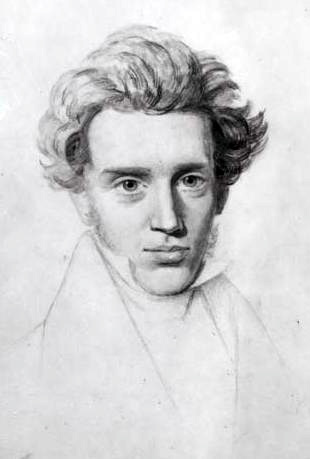
Søren Kierkegaard (d. November 11)

- January 6 – Giacomo Beltrami, Italian explorer (b. 1779)
- January 8 – Diponegoro, Leader of Javanese Rebellion (b. 1785)
- January 10 – Mary Russell Mitford, English novelist, dramatist (b. 1787)
- January 15 – Henri Braconnot, French chemist, pharmacist (b. 1780)
- January 17 – Shūsaku Narimasa Chiba, Japanese swordsman (b. 1792)
- January 26 – Gérard de Nerval, French writer (b. 1808)
- February 6 – Josef Munzinger, Member of the Swiss Federal Council (b. 1791)
- February 23 – Carl Friedrich Gauss, German mathematician, astronomer, and physicist (b. 1777)
- March 2 – Emperor Nicholas I of Russia (b. 1796)
- March 6 – Bandō Shūka I, Japanese Kabuki actor (b. 1813)
- March 8 – William Poole, infamous member of New York City's Bowery Boys Gang (b. 1821)
- March 29 – Henri Druey, member of the Swiss Federal Council (b. 1799)
- March 31 – Charlotte Brontë, English author (b. 1816)
- May 5 – Sir Robert Inglis, English politician (b. 1786)
- May 23 – Charles Robert Malden, English explorer (b. 1797)
- May 30 – Mary Reibey, Australian businesswoman (b. 1777)
- June 7 – Friederike Lienig, Latvian entomologist (b. 1790)
- June 28 – FitzRoy Somerset, 1st Baron Raglan, commander of British forces in the Crimean War (b. 1788)

=== July–December ===
- July 12 (June 30 O.S.) – Pavel Nakhimov, Russian admiral (b. 1802)
- August 7 – Mariano Arista, President of Mexico (b. 1802)
- August 12 – Helen Hunt Jackson, American activist (b. 1830)
- August 30 – Feargus O'Connor, British political radical, Chartist leader (b. 1794)
- September 7 – William Barton Wade Dent, U.S. Congressman (b. 1806)
- November 11 – Søren Kierkegaard, Danish philosopher (b. 1813)
- September 20 – José Trinidad Reyes, Honduran Father, national hero, and founder of Autonomous National University of Honduras (b. 1797)
- November 26 – Adam Mickiewicz, Lithuanian-Polish poet, writer (b. 1798)
- December 6 – William Swainson, English naturalist, artist (b. 1789)
