= Lockheed =

Lockheed (originally spelled Loughead) may refer to:

== Brands and enterprises ==
- Lockheed Corporation, a former American aircraft manufacturer
- Lockheed Martin, formed in 1995 by the merger of Lockheed Corporation and Martin Marietta
  - Lockheed Martin Aeronautics
  - Lockheed Martin Space Systems
- Lockheed Shipbuilding and Construction Company

== People ==
- Flora Haines Loughead (1855-1943), American writer, farmer, miner
- The brothers who founded the original Lockheed Corporation:
  - Allan Lockheed (1889–1969), American aviation pioneer
  - Malcolm Lockheed (1887–1958), American aviation pioneer

== Other uses ==
- Lockheed (character), a Marvel Comics character
- Lockheed Martin Transit Center, in Sunnyvale, California

== See also ==
- Lochhead, a surname
- Lougheed, a surname
