= Lougheed =

Lougheed is an Irish variant of a surname of Scottish origins, meaning head of the lake. Lougheed or Loughead may refer to:

== Places ==
- Lougheed, Alberta, a Canadian village
- Lougheed Island, Nunavut, Canada
- Lougheed Highway, part of British Columbia Highway 7
- The City of Lougheed, a shopping mall in Burnaby, British Columbia, Canada
- Mount Lougheed, Alberta, Canada

== People ==
- Allan Lockheed (born Loughead), American co-founder of Lockheed Corporation and brother of Malcolm
- Cook Lougheed, American entrepreneur and philanthropist
- Dave Lougheed, Canadian international rugby player
- James Alexander Lougheed, Canadian businessman and politician
- Lisa Lougheed, Canadian singer and voice actress
- Malcolm Loughead (born Loughead), American co-founder of Lockheed Corporation and brother of Allan
- Peter Lougheed, lawyer, Premier of Alberta, and Canadian Football League player

== See also ==
- Lochhead, a surname
- Lockheed (disambiguation)
