= Loughead F-1 =

F-1
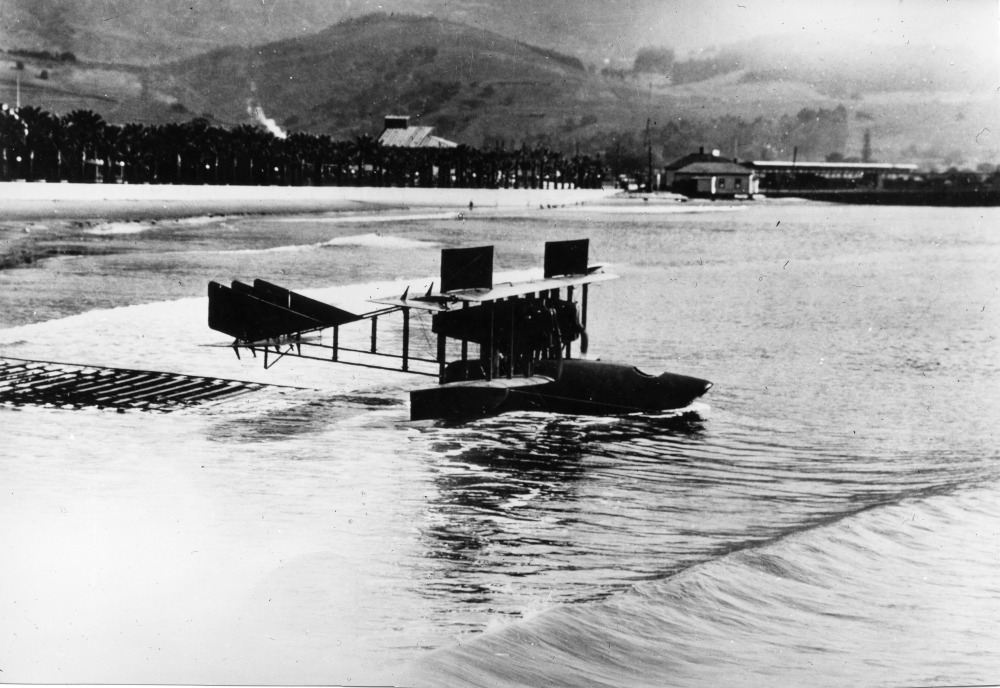

General information
- Type: Passenger Flying-boat
- National origin: United States
- Manufacturer: Loughead Aircraft Manufacturing Company
- Number built: 1

History
- First flight: 28 March 1918

The Loughead F-1 "Flying-boat One" was an early American ten-passenger biplane flying boat made by the Loughead brothers' new company the Loughead Aircraft Manufacturing Company, the forerunner to Lockheed.

== Design ==
The F-1 was a biplane flying boat powered by two 160 hp (120 kW) Hall-Scott A-5 liquid-cooled engines with two-bladed tractor propellers fitted between the two wings. The lower wing was attached to a fuselage nacelle and the upper wing mounted on steel interplane struts. The fuselage nacelle had room in an open cockpit for a crew of two side by side plus eight to ten passengers. Twin uncovered booms supported the tail surfaces, with two fins and three rudders. At the end of the lower wings were fitted stabilizing wingtip floats. When the F-1 was later modified into a landplane as the F-1A, the original fuselage and hull were replaced, and a tricycle landing gear fitted.

== Development ==
Formerly with the Alco Hydro-Aeroplane Company in 1916, the Loughead brothers (Allan and Malcolm) started the Loughead Aircraft Manufacturing Company in Santa Barbara, California to build the F-1 flying boat for their aerial sightseeing business. Preliminary design work had been started by Alan Loughead in early 1916, and they began its construction in a rented garage, which soon attracted the attention of 20-year-old John K. "Jack" Northrop. Northrop was skilled in drafting and mathematics, and the Lougheads quickly put him to work helping to design the F-1.

When the United States entered World War I in 1917, Allan Loughead went to Washington to try to get a Navy contract to build the F-1 in quantity. The Navy informed Lockheed that it would purchase only previously approved designs. Later, Loughead said of this visit, "Down there I lost all the patriotism I ever had." However, he did return with a contract to build two Curtiss flying boats and an agreement for the Navy to test the F-1.

The F-1 first flew from Santa Barbara Bay on 28 March 1918. Allan Loughead and a crew of three flew it from Santa Barbara to San Diego in April 1918, setting a record of 181 minutes for the 211-mile flight. After the Navy completed its tests, the F-1 was returned to Loughead Aircraft and was then converted into the F-1A landplane. Lockheed now hoped to interest the Army in it as a long-range bomber or transport aircraft. However, the war ended before its conversion was completed.

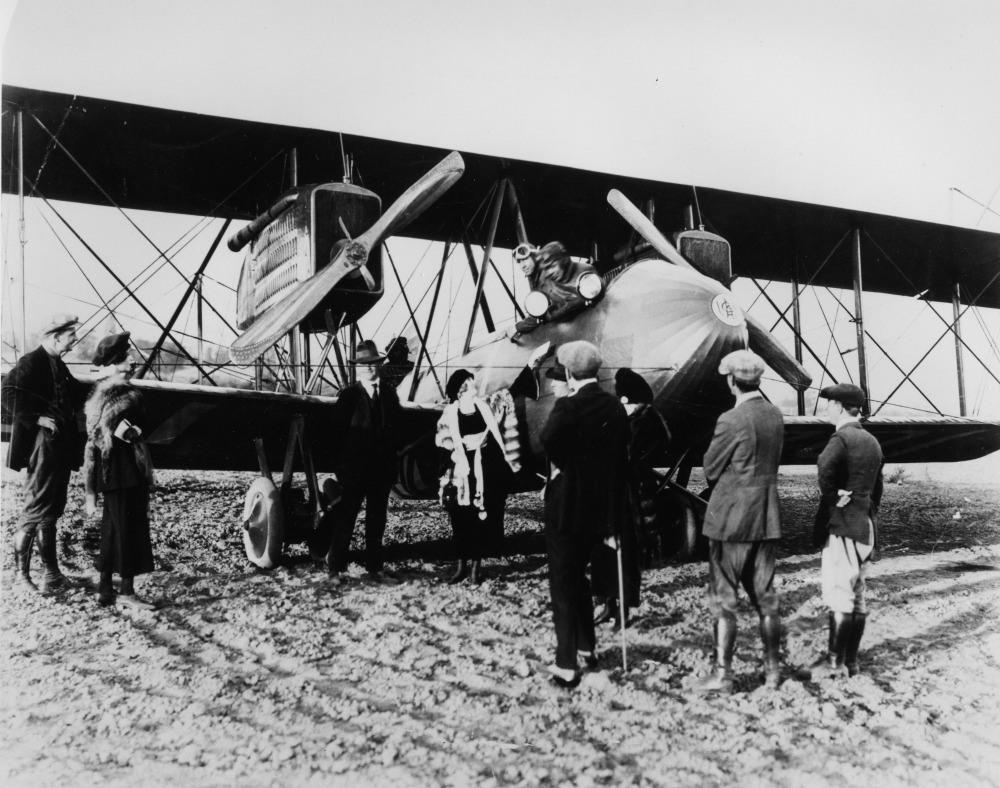

The Lougheads decided to demonstrate the long-range potential of the F-1A by making the first flight from Santa Barbara to Washington, D.C. The F-1 took off with a crew of three from Santa Barbara on 23 November, and flew over the Coastal Mountains. En route they encountered severe weather, but the weather cleared by the time they crossed the Colorado River at Yuma, Arizona. However, near Tacna, Arizona, an engine failed and the pilot made a rough landing on the desert. The mechanic worked on the engine while the two pilots caught a train back to Yuma to have the broken tailskid repaired. Then the trio cleared a makeshift runway, took off safely, and landed at Gila Bend, Arizona, for fuel. However, on the second takeoff attempt, the engine stopped, and the aircraft crashed nose-first into the ground. This ended the F-1A's transcontinental flight.

When Loughead Aircraft completed its two HS-2L flying boats for the Navy in early 1919, it then converted the damaged F-1A landplane back into the F-1 flying boat for its sightseeing flight operations. Among their most notable passengers were King Albert and Queen Elizabeth of Belgium, who the Lockheeds flew at the request of the U.S. government. Local movie studios gladly paid $50 an hour for flight time in the F-1 and $50 an hour while on standby. The brothers sold the F-1 in 1920 to raise capital to develop the S-1 sports biplane; the new owners were to have used it to fly to Catalina Island, but it was abandoned on the beach, and was slowly destroyed by vandalism.

== Specifications (F-1 flying-boat) ==
Data from

General characteristics

- Crew: two
- Capacity: eight-ten passengers
- Length: 35 ft 0 in (10.67 m)
- Upper wingspan: 74 ft 0 in (22.56 m)
- Lower wingspan: 47 ft 0 in (14.33 m)
- Height: 12 ft 0 in (3.66 m)
- Empty weight: 4,200 lb (1,905 kg)
- Gross weight: 7,300 lb (3,311 kg)
- Powerplant: 2 × Hall-Scott A-5 liquid-cooled piston engine, 160 hp (120 kW) each
- Propellers: 2-bladed

Performance

- Maximum speed: 73 kn (84 mph, 135 km/h)
- Cruise speed: 61 kn (70 mph, 110 km/h)
- Range: 440 nmi (510 mi, 820 km)
