= Loughead Aircraft Manufacturing Company =

1916–1920 aircraft manufacturer in the United States

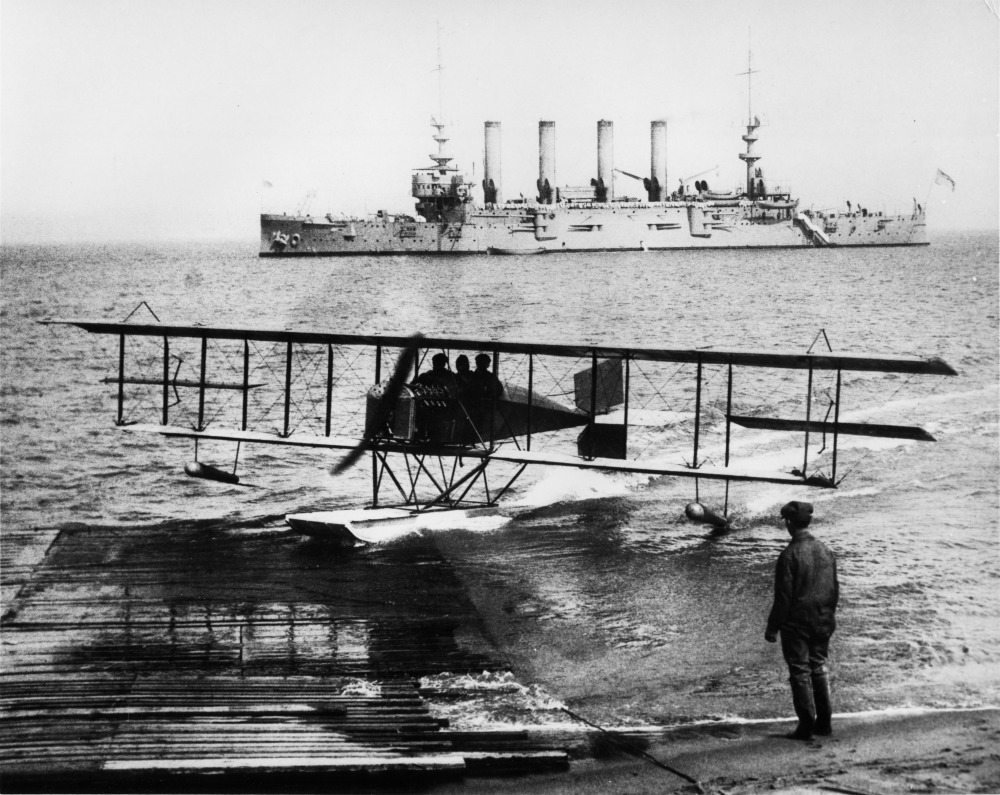
- Loughead Model G, San Francisco Bay, 1913
- Industry: Aerospace
- Founded: December 19, 1912
- Founder: Allan Lockheed; Malcolm Loughead
- Defunct: 1921
- Fate: closed in 1920 assets liquidated in 1921
- Products: Aircraft

The Loughead Aircraft Manufacturing Company (originally founded as the Alco Hydro-Aeroplane Company) was an American company which designed and built aircraft. The founder, Allan Lockheed, went on to form the similarly named but otherwise unrelated Lockheed Aircraft Company in 1926, which would merge with Martin Marietta in 1995 to form today's Lockheed Martin.

== History ==
The Alco Hydro-Aeroplane Company was established in San Francisco on December 19, 1912 by the brothers Allan and Malcolm Loughead. In 1916, the company was renamed the Loughead Aircraft Manufacturing Company and relocated to Santa Barbara, California, the same year Santa Barbara resident Jack Northrop (aged 20) took his first job in aviation working as a draftsman for Loughead Aircraft. The company proceeded to design and construct the Model F-1 flying boat, which debuted on March 29, 1918, and set the American non-stop record for seaplane flight by flying from Santa Barbara to San Diego.

Following the Model F-1, the company invested heavily in the design and development of a revolutionary monocoque aircraft called the Model S-1. However, the asking price of $2500 could not compete in a market that was saturated with post World War 1 $350 Curtiss JN-4s and de Havilland trainers. The Loughead Aircraft Manufacturing Company closed in 1921.

=== Alco Hydro-Aeroplane Company ===
Loughead returned to San Francisco in 1912 and went to work as an auto mechanic. There, he and his brother Malcolm spent their spare time building a three-place seaplane to operate from San Francisco Bay. They constantly ran out of money until they convinced Max Mamlock of the Alco Cab Company to invest $4,000 in the plane. Finally, after 18 months, their Model G was christened the ALCO NO. 1 in 1913, and Allan Loughead made a successful flight in it from the waters of the Golden Gate entrance to San Francisco Bay.

That first flight was on June 15, 1913. The flight reached an altitude of 300 feet and a speed of 60 miles per hour. Allan then returned to take Malcolm for a ride. The Model G made three flights that day.

Allan Lockheed recalled in 1942 that the Model G was built mostly with hand tools and called the aircraft "one of the first successful three place tractor seaplanes in the United States."

While the Model G, the first plane to bear the Loughead (Lockheed) name, was far ahead of its time, few would pay $10 to fly in it. Mamlock soon lost his enthusiasm for aviation and seized the plane. He told the Lougheads if they wanted it back, they would have to repay his $4,000. Consequently, in the hopes of striking it rich, the Loughead brothers spent two unsuccessful years prospecting in California's gold country.

With the financial aid of Paul Meyer, Allan and Malcolm Loughead bought the Model G back in 1915 and opened a flying concession at the Panama–Pacific International Exposition in San Francisco. In five months, they took 600 paying passengers aloft and netted $4,000. Henry Ford was one person who turned down a ride, saying, "I would not take even a straightaway flight four feet above the bay in anybody's aeroplane for all the money in California."

In early 1916, the Loughead brothers moved the operation to Santa Barbara, where they were swamped by people wanting to make their first flight. In addition, they made charter flights to the off-shore islands, and local movie companies used the plane to take aerial footage.

=== Loughead Aircraft Manufacturing Company ===
In 1916, the brothers organized the Loughead Aircraft Manufacturing Company in Santa Barbara to build a huge 10-place, twin-engined F-1 flying boat for their aerial sightseeing business. They began construction in a rented garage, which attracted the attention of 20-year-old John K. "Jack" Northrop. Northrop was skilled in drafting and mathematics, and the Lougheads employed him in designing the F-1.

When the United States entered World War I in 1917, Allan Loughead went to Washington, D.C. to try to get a Navy contract to build the F-1 in quantity. The Navy informed Loughead that it would purchase only previously approved designs. Later, Loughead said of this visit, "Down there I lost all the patriotism I ever had." However, he did return with a contract to build two Curtiss flying boats and an agreement for the Navy to test the F-1.

When the F-1 was completed, Allan Loughead and a crew of three flew it from Santa Barbara to San Diego in April 1918, setting a record of 181 minutes for the 211-mile flight. After the Navy completed its tests, the F-1 was returned to Loughead Aircraft and was then converted into the F-lA land-plane. Loughead now hoped to interest the Army in it as a long-range bomber or transport plane. The war ended before its conversion was completed.

The Lougheads decided to demonstrate the long-range potential of the F-lA by making the first flight from Santa Barbara to Washington, D.C. Their crew included pilot Orvar Meyerhoffer, co-pilot Aaron R. Ferneau, and mechanic Leo G. Flint. They departed Santa Barbara on November 23 and crossed the Coastal Mountains. En route they encountered severe weather, but the weather cleared when they crossed the Colorado River at Yuma, Arizona. Near Tacna, Arizona, an engine failed and Meyerhoffer made a rough landing. Flint worked on the engine while Meyerhoffer and Ferneau caught a train back to Yuma to have the broken tailskid repaired. Then the trio cleared a makeshift runway, took off, and landed at Gila Bend, Arizona, for fuel. On the second takeoff attempt, the engine quit, and the plane crashed nose first into the ground. That ended the F-lA's transcontinental flight.

When Loughead Aircraft completed its two HS-2L flying boats for the Navy in early 1919, it then converted the damaged F-lA landplane back into the F-1 flying boat for its sightseeing flight operations. Among their most notable passengers were King Albert and Queen Elisabeth of Belgium, whom the Lougheads flew at the request of the U.S. government. Albert and Elisabeth were so impressed with their flight out to Santa Cruz Island that they presented Allan and Malcolm with the Belgian Order of the Golden Crown. In addition, local movie studios gladly paid $50 an hour for flight time in the F-1 and $50 an hour while on standby.

In 1919, Loughead Aircraft entered the small aircraft market with the single-seat S-1 Sport Biplane. Intended to be "the poor man's airplane", it featured an innovative molded plywood monocoque fuselage for which the Lougheads, Northrop and Tony Stadlman received a patent. Its foldable wings allowed storage in a garage, and the lower wings could be rotated to act as ailerons and airbrakes. Because no suitable engines were available, the company designed and built a 25-horsepower water-cooled engine for the S-1.

The S-1 was tested successfully at Redwood City, CA in 1919 by Gilbert Budwig and flew well. After the S-1 completed its test flights, the pilot said it was the most flyable plane he had ever flown. The plane made hundreds of flights and proved to be a successful design.

At an aircraft show in San Francisco, thousands admired the S-1, but no one ordered the $2,500 plane. Allan Loughead realized that the government's sale of war surplus aircraft for as little as $300 had killed the market for new aircraft. As a result, Loughead Aircraft closed in 1920 and its assets were liquidated in 1921.

== Products ==
- Model G (ALCO No. 1) touring aircraft
- Model F-1 flying boat
- Model S-1 Sport general aviation biplane
