= Lochhead =

Lochhead is a surname shared by several notable people, among them being:

- Alex Lochhead (born 1866), Scottish footballer
- Andy Lochhead (born 1941), Scottish footballer
- Archie Lochhead (1892–1971), Scottish-American banker
- Arthur Lochhead (1897–1966), Scottish footballer
- David Lochhead (1936–1999), Canadian theologian
- Duggie Lochhead (1904–1968), Scottish football manager
- Kenneth Lochhead (1926–2006), Canadian painter
- Liz Lochhead (born 1947), Scottish poet and playwright
- Matty Lochhead (1884–1964), Scottish footballer
- Richard Lochhead (born 1969), Scottish politician
- Sheila Lochhead (1910–1994), Scottish political hostess, daughter of British Prime Minister Ramsay MacDonald
- Tony Lochhead (born 1982), New Zealand former professional soccer player

== See also ==
- Lockheed (disambiguation)
- Lougheed (disambiguation)
