= Grant Land =

Coordinates: 82°30′N 72°0′W

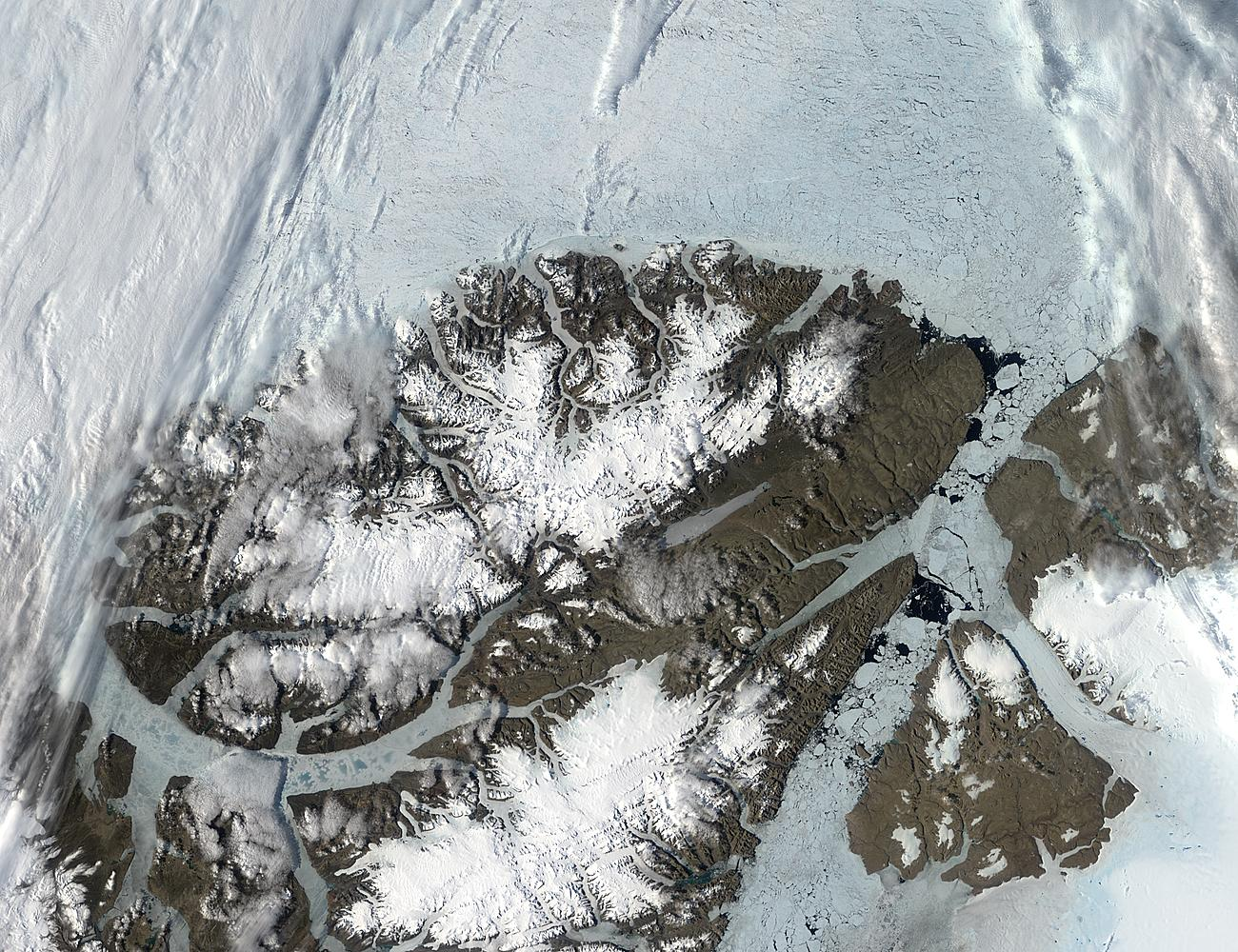
Grant Land

Grant Land is the northern lobe of Ellesmere Island, Nunavut, Canada. Situated on the north coast, Cape Columbia, it is the northernmost point of Canada, only 770 km from the North Pole, and was used as the final point on land for Peary's North Pole expedition in 1909.

At its highest point, it is 3,353 metres (11,001 ft) above sea level.
