= Eduard Birnbaum =

Polish-born German cantor

- Born: 12 March 1855
- Died: 8 August 1920 (aged 65)
- Other names: Asher Anshel Birnbaum
- Occupation: Hazzan

Eduard (Asher Anshel) Birnbaum (1855–1920) was a Polish-born German hazzan (cantor) and one of the first explorers of Jewish music.

== Life and work ==
Birnbaum was born on 12 March 1855 in Kraków.

He studied synagogal music for three years in Vienna with Salomon Sulzer. In 1872 he was appointed deputy cantor of the community of Magdeburg. Two years later he became the chief cantor in Beuthen, where he began to collect printed and manuscript music, literature and source material, which became the basis for his research, as well as for his critical treatise on Baal T'fillah, a collection of 1,500 Jewish ritual melodies and recitatives by Cantor Abraham Bär (1834–1894), published in 1877. In 1879, Birnbaum succeeded Zvi Hirsch Weintraub as the main cantor in the Jewish community of Königsberg and held this position until his death in 1920.

Birnbaum published two volumes of Liturgische Übungen (Liturgical Exercises) (1900 and 1912). He also composed liturgical works, some of which were published posthumously in Der jüdische Kantor (The Jewish Cantor) 1927–1931. His writings were acquired as the Birnbaum Collection by the Hebrew Union College-Jewish Institute of Religion in Cincinnati. They contain his thematic catalogue, which lists synagogal melodies on about 7,000 cards, as well as his collection of references to music in rabbinical texts.

Birnbaum died on 8 August 1920 in Königsberg.
