= Loughead S-1 Sport =

S-1 Sport
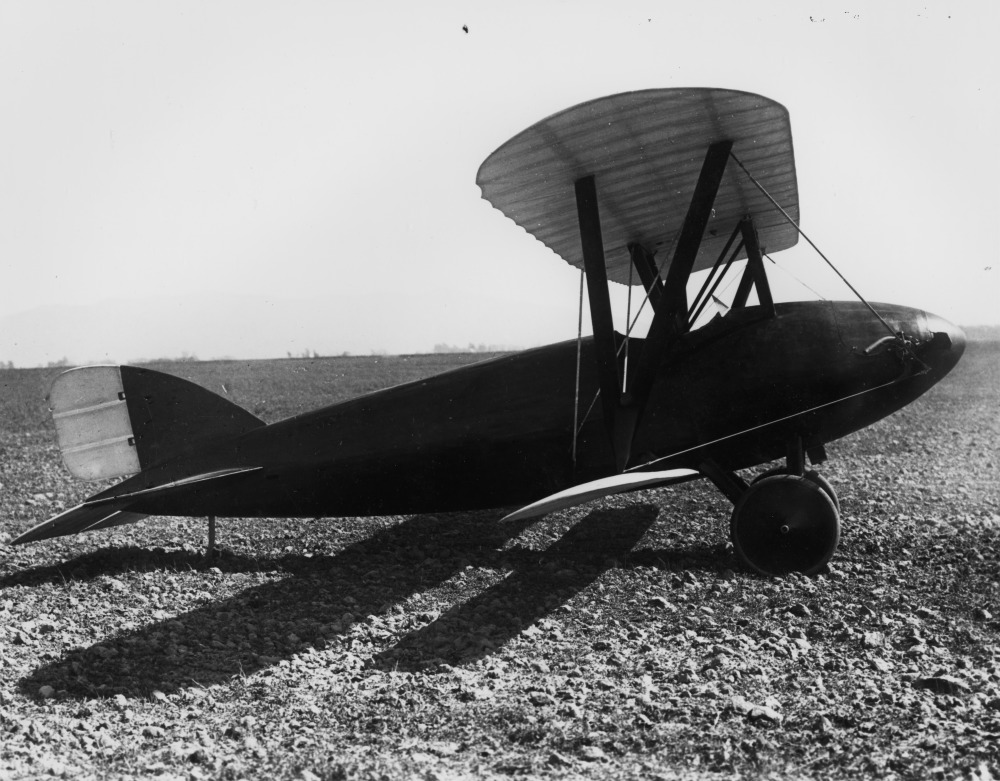

General information
- Type: Sport biplane
- National origin: United States of America
- Manufacturer: Loughead Aircraft Manufacturing Company
- Designer: Loughead brothers, John Northrop

History
- Manufactured: 1
- Introduction date: 1920 San Francisco Aeronautical Exposition
- First flight: 11 April 1920

The Loughead S-1 "Sport-1" was an early single seat biplane made by the Loughead brothers, the forerunner to Lockheed.

== Design and development ==
The S-1 was developed to produce aircraft with existing capacity and skill of Loughead workers after the end of World War I contracts. The aircraft specifications were to be STOL, affordable, as well as capable of being stored in a garage and towed by a car.

The S-1 was originally intended to be a two-seater, but was switched to a single place design to make production costs lower. The two cylinder engine was designed in-house by Anthony Stadlman. The fuselage was built using an all-wood, multi-layer monocoque laid up in concrete molds. The process would be later applied to the larger and more famous Lockheed Vega aircraft. The wings folded along the side of the aircraft for storage. Roll control was via a system that pivoted the entire lower wing surfaces. They also could be pivoted a full 90 degrees as a massive air brake.

== Operational history ==
Only one prototype was built and test flown in 1920 by Gilbert G. Budwig. The S-1 was not marketable against the flood of surplus World War I aircraft on the market at the time. The company was liquidated soon afterward in 1921 and reformed again with the new Lockheed Vega based on the S-1 in 1926.

The prototype does not exist, the engine is currently in private ownership.

== Specifications (S-1) ==
Data from Sport Aviation

General characteristics

- Capacity: 1
- Length: 21 ft (6.4 m)
- Wingspan: 28 ft (8.5 m)
- Gross weight: 790 lb (358 kg)
- Fuel capacity: 7 US gallons (26 L; 5.8 imp gal)
- Powerplant: 1 × Loughead XL-1 two cylinder water cooled horizontally-opposed piston engine, 25 hp (19 kW)

Performance

- Maximum speed: 65 kn (75 mph, 121 km/h)
- Cruise speed: 43 kn (50 mph, 80 km/h)
- Stall speed: 22 kn (25 mph, 40 km/h)

== Notes ==
- US Patent #1,425,113, 8, August 1922
