= Allan Lockheed =

American aviation engineer and industrialist (1889–1969)

- Lockheed in the 1960s
- Born: Allan Haines Loughead; January 20, 1889; Niles, California, U.S.
- Died: May 26, 1969 (aged 80); Tucson, Arizona, U.S.
- Occupations: Engineer, industrialist
- Known for: Lockheed Corporation
- Parent: Flora Haines Loughead (mother)
- Family: Malcolm Lockheed (brother)

Allan Haines Lockheed (né Allan Haines Loughead; January 20, 1889 – May 26, 1969) was an American aviation engineer and businessman. He formed the Alco Hydro-Aeroplane Company along with his brother, Malcolm Loughead, which became Lockheed Corporation.

Loughead changed his name during 1934 to Allan Lockheed, the phonetic spelling of his family name, to avoid spelling confusion. He went on to begin two other aircraft manufacturing companies in the 1930s. He focused on real estate between the 1940s to 1960s.

== Early life ==
Loughead was born in Niles, California, on 21 January 1889.

Flora Haines Loughead was a well-known novelist and journalist. The Loughead brothers attended elementary school only, but were mechanically inclined from an early age. He worked as a mechanic in San Francisco during the early 1900s. By 1909, he was driving race cars.

== Early experience with aviation ==
Loughead began his aviation experience with the Curtiss Model D as an employee for James E. Plew. Allan and Malcolm Loughead installed a 2-cylinder, 12 hp motor on the Montgomery glider with Victor as engineer. During 1910, he became a pilot.

The Curtiss pusher was powered by a 30 hp engine.

When Plew withdrew from aviation after two of his planes were wrecked and a student killed, Loughead became a flight instructor with the International Aeroplane Manufacturing Company in Chicago, and put on aerial exhibitions for 25% of the gate receipts. Later he said: "I was really rich the first week out. I made something like $850." During an exhibition at Hoopeston, Illinois, his rain-soaked airplane failed to climb enough and was entangled in telephone wires. At that point, he decided to build a better aircraft so he could collect all of the gate receipts.

== Alco Hydro-Aeroplane Company ==
Loughead returned to San Francisco in 1912 and went to work as an auto mechanic. There, he and his brother Malcolm spent their spare time building a three-place seaplane to operate from San Francisco Bay. They constantly ran out of money until they convinced Max Mamlock of the Alco Cab Company to invest $4,000 in the plane. Finally, after 18 months, their Model G was christened the ALCO NO. 1 in 1913, and Allan Loughead made a successful flight in it from the waters of the Golden Gate entrance to San Francisco Bay.

That first flight was on June 15, 1913. The flight reached an altitude of 300 feet and a speed of 60 miles per hour. Allan then returned to take Malcolm for a ride. The Model G made three flights that day.

Allan Lockheed recalled in 1942 that the Model G was built mostly with hand tools and called the aircraft "one of the first successful three place tractor seaplanes in the United States."

While the Model G, the first plane to bear the Loughead (Lockheed) name, was far ahead of its time, few would pay $10 to fly in it. Mamlock soon lost his enthusiasm for aviation and seized the plane. He told the Lougheads if they wanted it back, they would have to repay his $4,000. Consequently, in the hopes of striking it rich, the Loughead brothers spent two unsuccessful years prospecting in California's gold country.

With the financial aid of Alaskan pioneer Paul Meyer, Allan and Malcolm Loughead bought the Model G back in 1915 and opened a flying concession at the Panama–Pacific International Exposition in San Francisco. In five months, they took 600 paying passengers aloft and netted $4,000. Henry Ford was one person who turned down a ride, saying, "I would not take even a straightaway flight four feet above the bay in anybody's aeroplane for all the money in California."

In early 1916, the Loughead brothers moved the operation to Santa Barbara, where they were swamped by people wanting to make their first flight. In addition, they made charter flights to the off-shore islands, and local movie companies used the plane to take aerial footage.

== Loughead Aircraft Manufacturing Company ==
In 1916, the brothers founded Loughead Aircraft Manufacturing Company in Santa Barbara to build a 10-place, twin-engined F-1 flying boat for their aerial sightseeing business. They began construction in a rented garage, which attracted the attention of 20-year-old John K. "Jack" Northrop. Northrop was skilled in drafting and mathematics, and the Lougheads employed him in designing the F-1.

When the United States entered World War I in 1917, Allan Loughead went to Washington, D.C. to get a Navy contract to build the F-1 in quantity. The Navy informed Loughead that it would purchase only previously approved designs. Later, Loughead said of this visit, "Down there I lost all the patriotism I ever had." He did return with a contract to build two Curtiss flying boats and an agreement for the Navy to test the F-1.

When the F-1 was completed, Allan Loughead and a crew of three flew it from Santa Barbara to San Diego in April 1918, setting a record of 181 minutes for the 211-mile flight. After the Navy completed its tests, the F-1 was returned to Loughead Aircraft and was then converted into the F-lA land-plane. Loughead hoped to interest the Army in it as a long-range bomber or transport plane. The war ended before its conversion was completed.

The Lougheads attempted to demonstrate the long-range potential of the F-lA by making the first flight from Santa Barbara to Washington, D.C. Their crew included pilot Orvar Meyerhoffer, co-pilot Aaron R. Ferneau, and mechanic Leo G. Flint. They departed Santa Barbara on November 23. En route they encountered severe weather, which cleared when they crossed the Colorado River at Yuma, Arizona. Near Tacna, Arizona, an engine failed and Meyerhoffer made a rough landing. Flint worked on the engine while Meyerhoffer and Ferneau took a train to Yuma to have the broken tailskid repaired. The trio cleared a makeshift runway, took off, and landed at Gila Bend, Arizona for fuel. On the second takeoff attempt, the engine quit, and the plane crashed nose first into the ground. That ended the F-lA's transcontinental flight.

When Loughead Aircraft completed its two HS-2L flying boats for the Navy in early 1919, it then converted the damaged F-lA landplane back into the F-1 flying boat for its sightseeing flight operations. Among their most notable passengers were King Albert and Queen Elisabeth of Belgium, whom the Lougheads flew at the request of the US government. Albert and Elisabeth were so impressed with their flight to Santa Cruz Island that they presented Allan and Malcolm with the Belgian Order of the Golden Crown. Local movie studios paid $50 an hour for flight time in the F-1 and $50 an hour while on standby.

In 1919, Loughead Aircraft entered the small aircraft market with the single-seat S-1 Sport Biplane. Intended to be "the poor man's airplane", it featured an innovative molded plywood monocoque fuselage for which the Lougheads, Northrop and Tony Stadlman received a patent. Its foldable wings allowed storage in a garage, and the lower wings could be rotated to act as ailerons and airbrakes. Because no suitable engines were available, the company designed and built a 25-horsepower water-cooled engine for the S-1.

The S-1 was tested successfully at Redwood City, California, in 1919 by Gilbert Budwig and flew well. After the S-1 completed test flights, the pilot said it was the most flyable plane he had ever flown. The plane made hundreds of flights and proved to be a successful design.

At an aircraft show in San Francisco, thousands admired the S-1, but no one ordered the $2,500 plane. Allan Loughead realized that the government's sale of war surplus aircraft for as little as $300 had killed the market for new aircraft. As a result, Loughead Aircraft closed in 1920 and its assets were liquidated in 1921.

== Lockheed Hydraulic Brake Company ==
Malcolm Loughead formed the Lockheed Hydraulic Brake Company in 1919 to promote a revolutionary four-wheel hydraulic brake system that he had invented. Tired of his name being mispronounced "Log-head", Malcolm changed the spelling to match its pronunciation. Walter Chrysler introduced the Lockheed brake system on the first Chrysler car in 1924. Malcolm sold his business to Bendix in 1932.

== Real estate business ==
From 1920 to 1922, Allan Loughead was the Los Angeles sales manager for Lockheed brakes.

In the summer of 1922, Allan Loughead operated a ride concession at Catalina Island. Called "The Thrill of Avalon", it consisted of a touring car body mounted on two seaplane floats and powered by an aircraft engine driving a pusher propeller. The skimmer proved to be too rough and noisy to be popular and lasted only a year. Later, when asked if he made any profit on the venture, Loughead laughed and said, "No, we went broke, which was not a new experience!"

In 1922, Allan Loughead became a real estate salesman in the Hollywood area. He wrote in 1942 that the real estate business was "not particulary [sic] interesting, but from a financial standpoint [it was] very successful."

Whenever possible, Loughead and Jack Northrop would get together and discuss ideas about new aircraft. By then Northrop was an engineer with the Douglas Aircraft Company.

In 1926, Allan Loughead and Jack Northrop decided to build a high-speed monoplane with a capacity of four passengers and a pilot in a streamlined fuselage using their patented monocoque construction. Northrop created drawings of the plane at home. The plane was to be powered by the new Wright Whirlwind engine. The only disagreement arose over the wing. Northrop wanted to use a self-supporting cantilever design that eliminated wing struts. Loughead believed the public wouldn't want to fly in a plane without visible wing supports. In the end, Northrop won.

== Lockheed Aircraft Corporation ==
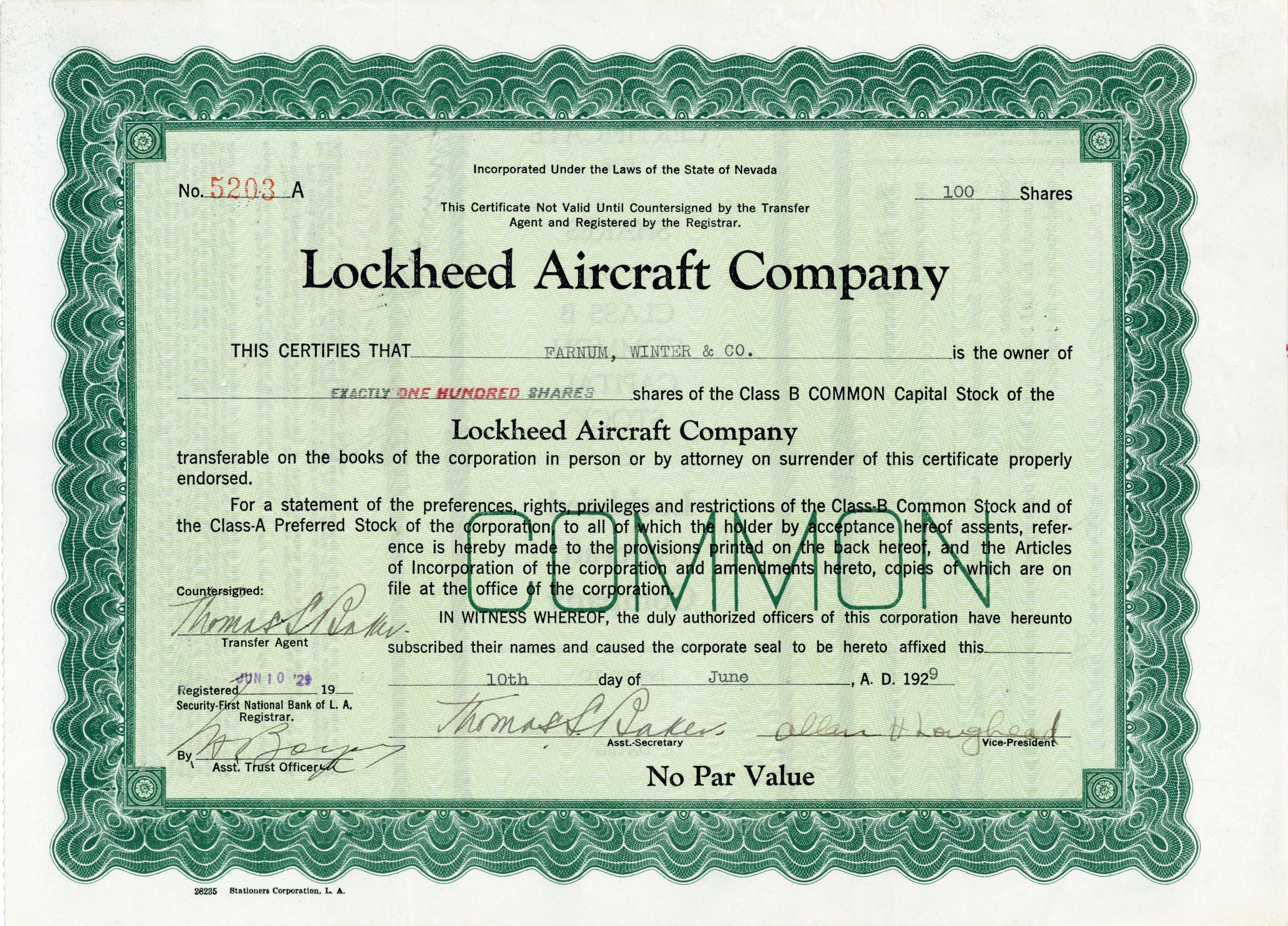
Stock certificate of the Lockheed Aircraft Company for 100 shares, issued June 10, 1929, signed in original by company founder Allan H. Loughead as Vice President

Loughead and Northrop set out to form an aircraft company. Loughead's accountant friend, Kenneth Jay, introduced them to Fred S. Keeler, a successful brick and ceramics manufacturer. After reviewing their proposal, he agreed to help finance the project. As a result, using $22,500 from Keeler and $2,500 from Loughead, the four formed the Lockheed Aircraft Corporation in December 1926, with Keeler as president, Loughead as vice president and general manager, Northrop as chief engineer and Stadlman as factory superintendent. They used the "Lockheed" spelling to associate themselves with Malcolm's successful brake company.

The company established operations in a garage in Hollywood in January 1927. While Loughead continued his real estate business, he arrived every afternoon to help on the plane. The first major task was to build a concrete mold, shaped like an elongated bath tub, for molding half of the laminated wood fuselage. Two halves were made and then fastened to a skeleton framework of wood to form the fuselage. Next came the construction of the plywood-covered cantilever wing, the tail surfaces, the landing gear and mounting the engine. When completed, the company had invested nearly $17,500 in the plane, which was named the Vega. The result was a successful high-speed monoplane with a range of 1,000 miles, a cruising speed of 185 miles per hour, and capacity of six people.

The timing of the Vega was propitious. In 1927, Charles Lindbergh's flight from New York to Paris renewed interest in aviation. Soon after, James D. Dole, president of the Hawaiian Pineapple Company, offered a prize of $25,000 ($372,000 in 2020) to the first person to fly from North America to Hawaii after August 12, 1927. As a result, George Hearst, publisher of the San Francisco Examiner, bought a Vega for $12,500 and entered it in the Dole Air Race under the name Golden Eagle. Later Loughead said, "The sales price represented a loss, but we were happy to absorb it. The prestige of selling the Vega to Hearst was tremendous." Hearst also ordered a Vega seaplane for a flight to Australia.

All the Lockheed personnel were present when the first Vega was trucked to a hayfield near Inglewood, California. Test pilot Eddie Bellande took it up on its first flight. Upon landing, he yelled, "Boys, she's a dandy, a real joy to fly!"

=== Dole Race ===
World War I flyer Jack Frost was chosen to pilot the Golden Eagle with Gordon Scott as his navigator. The plane was provided with many safety features and equipped for 30 days of survival at sea. At noon on August 16, the starter's flag dropped at Oakland's unfinished airport and the Travel Air Oklahoma departed first. Minutes later, the privately built El Encanto groundlooped off the runway. Then the Breese Pabco Pacific Flyer failed to get airborne. At 12:30 p.m. the Golden Eagle lifted off and headed out over the Golden Gate for Honolulu. It was followed by the Buhl Miss Doran, the Breese Aloha, the Travel Air Woolaroc, and the Swallow Dallas Spirit. The Miss Doran, Oklahoma and Dallas Spirit soon returned with difficulties. Only the Miss Doran was able to become airborne again, and by 2 p.m., Loughead knew the Lockheed Vega was the fastest plane in the race.

None of the planes carried radio transmitters - all Loughead could do was to await news from Hawaii. The airplanes were supposed to arrive about 1 p.m. the next day. The next morning, Jim Dole and the race committee gathered on Wheeler Field at Honolulu. The Travel Air Woolaroc landed after 26 hours and 16 minutes aloft, and Art Goebel and Bill Davis crawled out to claim the $25,000 first prize. Two hours later, the Breese Aloha landed, and Martin Jensen and Paul Schluter claimed the $10,000 second prize. It became apparent that the Golden Eagle and Miss Doran were down in the Pacific. Despite an extensive air and sea search, no trace of either plane was found.

=== Arctic exploration ===
Gloom fell over the Lockheed factory, even though a factory demonstrator Vega was underway. Arctic explorer Captain George Hubert Wilkins had seen the Golden Eagle from his San Francisco hotel window during a test flight. He was so impressed that he went to the Oakland airport to learn more about it. Then he drove to Hollywood and met with Loughead, Northrop, and others and pored over its drawings. He placed an order for the third Vega equipped for Arctic exploration. After flight tests in January 1928, by Eddie Bellande, he said, "She's a pippin!"

Wilkins selected Arctic flyer Carl Ben Eielson to pilot the Vega on a planned flight from Barrow, Alaska, the northernmost settlement in Alaska, over the Arctic region to the island of Spitsbergen near Norway. After Eielson tested the plane, it was shipped to Fairbanks, Alaska. Eielson and Wilkins then flew it to Barrow. From there, after waiting three weeks for good weather, they took off from a crude ice runway and headed for the island of Spitsbergen.

For the first 500 miles (800 km), the weather was clear. Then dense clouds forced frequent course changes. They made landfall at Grant Land in Canada's northern reaches. Then, as they edged around the northern tip of Greenland, they encountered more bad weather. Within 200 miles (320 km) of their goal, they encountered a raging blizzard. Fuel was dangerously low, but Eielson spun down through a hole in the clouds and landed safely on snow covered land.

Unable to see anything in the blizzard, the men curled up in the cabin. The blizzard blew for four days. On the fifth day the weather cleared, and they spent six hours clearing a makeshift runway in the snow. When they became airborne they saw the radio masts of Grønfjorden, Spitsbergen ahead. In less than 30 minutes, they landed there after spending 20.5 hours airborne and five days on the ground within sight of their goal.

Wilkin's flight across the Arctic was hailed as one of the greatest in aviation. Wilkins was knighted by King George V of the United Kingdom, while Eielson received the Distinguished Flying Cross and the Harmon Trophy from President Herbert Hoover. Before he returned to the US, Wilkins began planning an expedition to Antarctica and ordered a low-wing Lockheed Explorer seaplane. He soon changed his order to a high-wing Vega seaplane. After he and Eielson arrived in Antarctica in December 1928, they used the Vegas to make the first flights in history over the continent, and to explore much of its uncharted territory from the air. Thus the Vega became the first plane to discover new land, and Wilkins named many of its features after his friends and backers. He named the Lockheed Mountains after the builder of his plane.

=== Move to Burbank ===
The Wilkins expeditions to the Arctic and Antarctic brought Lockheed Aircraft a flood of orders, which required a move to new facilities in Burbank, California, in March 1928. Lockheed received an order for 20 Vegas worth $250,000 ($3.77 million in 2020), the largest commercial aircraft order to date. The nation's fledgling airlines soon recognized the potential of the Vega as an airmail and passenger plane. Also, Northrop designed the parasol wing Air Express for Western Air Express as an airmail and a passenger plane. The Vega, Explorer and Air Express, and the variants that stemmed from them, were used by the biggest names in aviation, Art Goebel, Bob Cantwell, Frank Hawks, Amelia Earhart, Wiley Post, Roscoe Turner, Jimmy Doolittle, and others, to set a number of distance, speed and endurance records. This led Allan Loughead to coin the famous phrase, "It Takes a Lockheed to Beat a Lockheed."

In 1928 the company sales exceeded one million dollars.

The Lockheed Vega remained the primary product of the Lockheed Corporation. The Vega was a high-wing, cantilever monoplane manufactured using the two-piece moulded-under-pressure streamlined plywood fuselage skin construction developed in Santa Barbara. The plane was manufactured in four-passenger and six-passenger variants. By April 1929, the company was producing five planes per week with less than 300 employees. The retail sales price of these planes averaged about $17,000 each.

=== Acquisition by Detroit Aircraft Corporation ===
In mid-1928, Jack Northrop left Lockheed Aircraft to start his own company. Gerald Vultee (later to found Vultee Aircraft) became the Lockheed chief engineer. Part of the reason Northrop left was that Lockheed's management refused to invest in developing new metal aircraft and chose to maximize revenue from its proven wood designs.

Meanwhile, the Detroit Aircraft Corporation, a holding company with assets of $28 million, began acquiring a portfolio of aviation companies. In July 1929, Fred E. Keeler, an investor who owned 51 percent of Lockheed, decided to sell the company assets to Detroit Aircraft Company. The acquisition was through an exchange of stock.

Unhappy with this situation, Allan Loughead resigned as president and general manager on June 3, 1929, and later sold his Detroit Aircraft stock for $23 a share. With the stock market crash in October 1929, Detroit Aircraft stock fell to 12.5 cents a share and by 1932 Lockheed Aircraft was bankrupt.

=== Receivership ===
A group of investors headed by brothers Robert Gross and Courtlandt S. Gross, and including Walter Varney bought the Lockheed company out of receivership in 1932. Allan Lockheed returned as a consultant but had no formal management role with his namesake company. The Lockheed Aircraft Company later became a major aerospace and defense company, and in 1995 merged with Martin Marietta to form Lockheed Martin.

== Later career ==
In 1930, Loughead formed the Lockheed Brothers Aircraft Corporation in Glendale, California, and developed the experimental Olympia Duo-four, a five-place high-wing monoplane with two engines mounted side by side in the wood monocoque fuselage nose. It had a plywood-covered wing and wheel pants. The fuselage was covered with a two-piece moulded-under-pressure plywood skin. He made numerous flights in this plane demonstrating its extremely safe single-engine performance. This fourth commercial aircraft venture by Loughead lasted until 1934.

In 1934, Loughead, tired of the many mispronunciations of his name, legally changed it from Loughead to Lockheed.

Lockheed spent the period from 1935 to 1936 as a consultant.

In 1937, Lockheed formed the Alcor Aircraft Corporation in San Francisco and developed the Alcor C-6-1, an 8-place, low-wing plane that also had excellent single-engine performance. Unfortunately, the prototype C-6-1 was lost over San Francisco Bay. During a 1938 test flight, the Alcor prototype went out of control. A pilot and a passenger bailed out, "leaving the plane to descend in slow circles until it hit the waters of the Golden Gate and sank, as related in the 1957 Lockheed history, "Of Men and Stars." The Alcor company folded in 1939.

"I guess Alcor was the final burnout for Dad," said his son, Allan Jr. "He got only enough money from the insurance to pay off the creditors and close the doors."

Afterwards, Lockheed continued to make design studies of aircraft, such as fighters and bombers, for war use.

In 1941, Lockheed became Vice President of the Berkey & Gay Furniture Company in Grand Rapids, Michigan, where he served as general manager of the Aviation Division and Director of Aircraft Engineering.

In August 1941, U.S. Secretary of Commerce Jesse H. Jones appointed Lockheed to the Cargo Plane Committee, which also included Andre Preister, William Bushnell Stout, Luther Harris, and J.W. Crowley. The committee was charged with drawing up basic design recommendations for a cargo plane for the Aviation Division of the Defense Supplies Corporation. The committee's work was completed and accepted in January 1942.

In October 1942, Lockheed became the general manager of the Aircraft Division of Grand Rapids Store Equipment Company, making parts for Navy fighters.

After the war, Allan Lockheed continued his career as a real estate salesman in California, while also occasionally serving as an aviation consultant.

In the mid-1950s, Lockheed Aircraft Corporation asked Allan Lockheed to return as a consultant, mainly to help on the "Of Men and Stars" history being prepared by Lockheed public relations writer Phil Juergens." Lockheed's son John Lockheed said that "Dad was delighted to come back to Lockheed." Allan Lockheed Jr., said, "It was a tremendous boost to his morale to be able to rejoin the company."

In 1961, Allan Lockheed moved to Tucson, Arizona, where he lived in semi-retirement. He continued as a consultant for the Lockheed Aircraft Corporation. Once, when someone asked Lockheed what he did in the early days of aviation, he answered, "I survived!"

== Death ==
Allan Lockheed died of liver cancer in Tucson on May 26, 1969, at the age of 80.

== Legacy ==
Lockheed was enshrined in the National Aviation Hall of Fame in Dayton, Ohio, in 1986. His daughter, Beth, was present, and his son John accepted the award on Lockheed's behalf.
