= Florence Huntley =

American journalist

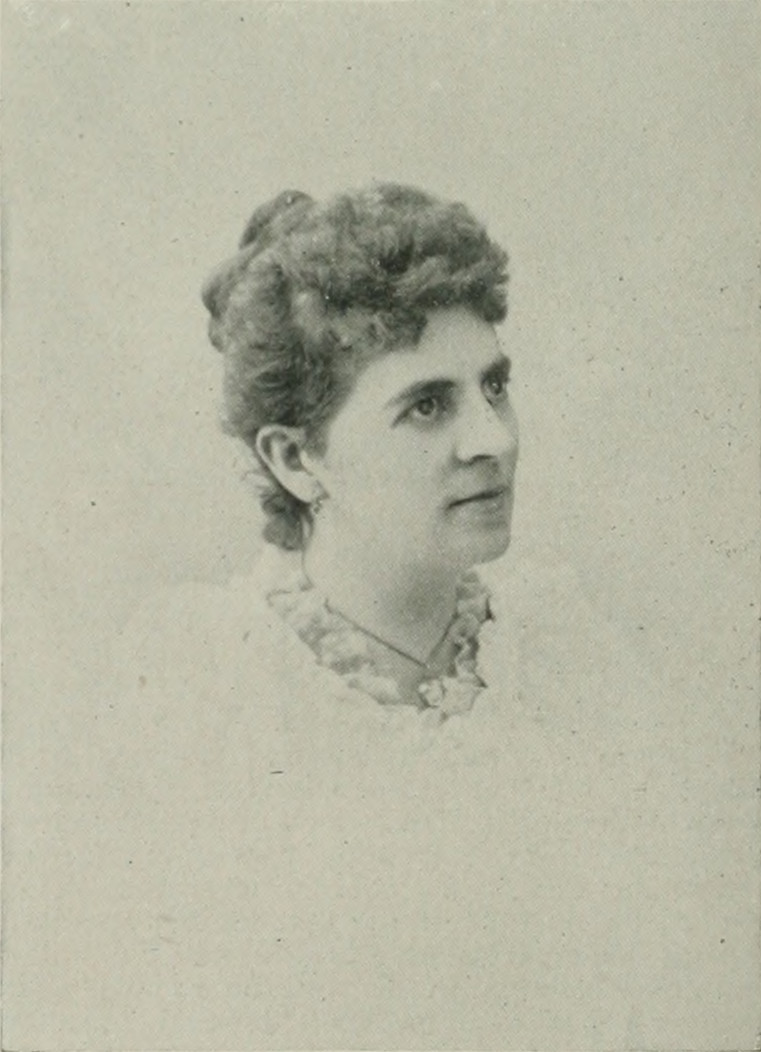
- Photo in A Woman of the Century
- Born: Florence Chance; 1855; Alliance, Ohio, U.S.
- Died: February 1, 1912 (aged 56–57); Oak Park, Illinois, U.S.
- Resting place: Oak Park Cemetery, Oak Park, Illinois
- Education: Methodist Female College (Ohio Wesleyan University)
- Occupations: journalist, editor, humorist, and occult author
- Spouse: Stanley Huntley John Emmett Richardson

Signature
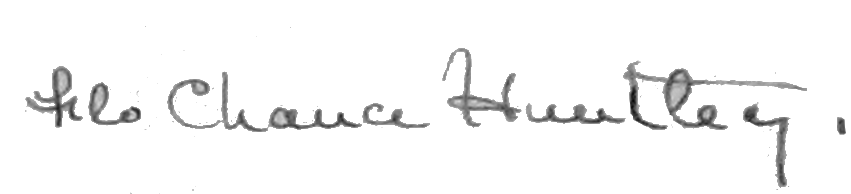

Florence Huntley (née, Chance; 1855 – February 1, 1912) was an American journalist, editor, humorist, and occult author of the long nineteenth century. Hailing from Ohio, she married the writer Stanley Huntley in 1879 and during this marriage, she worked with him on his Spoopendyke sketches. After his death in 1886, she became a journalist and editor, working for several publications, including the St. Paul Pioneer Press, Minneapolis Tribune, The Washington Post, and Iowa City Republican. After meeting John E. Richardson, whom she married decades later, she worked on the Harmonic Series, a system of science and philosophy intended to connect the demonstrated and recorded knowledge of ancient spiritual schools with the discovered and published facts of the modern physical school of science. She was the author of The Dream Child, in 1892; Harmonics of Evolution, 1897. She was the editor of The Great Psychological Crime, 1903; The Destructive Principle of Nature In Individual Life, 1903; The Great Work, the Constructive Principle of Individual Life, 1907. She wrote approximately 70,000 letters.

== Early life and education ==
Florence Chance was born in Alliance, Ohio, (or Fremont, Ohio), in 1855 or 1861. She was the daughter of Rev. Henry Chance, temperance reformer and a zealous member of the Methodist Episcopal Church, and Charlotte Trego Chance. Of three brothers older than Florence, one, Hon. Mahlon Chance, entered political life, and two were regular army officers, one being Capt. Josiah Chance, and the other, General Jesse C. Chance, retired.

After her course in the public schools, she was sent to Methodist Female College (merged into Ohio Wesleyan University, at Delaware, Ohio, with more the hope of correcting her religious views, which were regarded by her father as heretical, than for 'the educational advantages of that institution, but she graduated from there, retaining her heretical views, as before.

== Career ==
=== Spoopendyke ===
The climax of a young woman of free-thinking tendencies was her marriage to Stanley Huntley in 1879 in Bismarck, North Dakota. He was a wit and humorist, then editor of the Bismarck Tribune. They returned East in 1880. She suggested to her husband, who was a special writer on the Brooklyn Eagle, the sketches which made him famous, Mr. and Mrs. Spoopendyke being the characters. They were used, at her suggestion, in his special department under the title of "Salad." This department was written by Mr. Huntley on Fridays. Mrs. Huntley was often said to be the author of the "Spoopendyke" sketches, but she denied that she wrote but one of them; though she did publish two original Spoopendyke papers.

Early in 1882, the husband was compelled, by serious illness, to cease working for a number of months. Mrs. Huntley adopted the style employed by her husband, who was too ill to write or even to read a sketch, and the production went over the country as her husband's. While suggesting subjects to him, the work was done by him. Her husband being an invalid for two years before his death, Mrs. Huntley told of her own entrance into the literary field:

"The people who laughed over the humorous things he continued to write would have felt tears burning in their hearts, if they could have seen this frail, delicate, nervous man, racked with pain and burning with fever, sitting bravely at his desk writing jokes to pay our board bills. Now and then, when I could not bear to see him working thus, I prevailed on him to let me do it for him. In this way I wrote considerable for the 'Salad' column, but it was always supposed at the office that I had acted as his amanuensis. One, when driven by necessity, he agreed, against his inclination, to write a serial story for a New York young folks' paper. Three weeks after the beginning of ' Daddy Hoppler,' Mr. Huntley broke down completely and was ordered to sea by the physician. An increasing board bill and an unfinished contract stared us in the face and nerved me to the rashness of writing the next installment, for which I received twenty dollars. This encouraged me. At the end of five weeks Mr. Huntley returned, considerably improved, and found me with bills all paid and a new serial under way, and the gifted editor apparently none the wiser."

=== Journalist ===
With the death of Mr. Huntley, in 1885, Mrs. Huntley's independent literary life began, first as a political news writer from Dakota Territory to the Saint Paul, Minnesota and Minneapolis dailies, next as editor and humorous paragrapher on the (now Minneapolis Star-Tribune, which was resigned for a similar position on The Washington Post in 1890, where remained for a year, having charge of a woman's page and regular editorial and humorous paragraphs. This, in turn, was abandoned for independent work, which included a Congressional news bureau for The Hutchinson News in Hutchinson, Kansas; short stories for the National Tribune at Washington, D.C.; Capitol gossip for New York City and Chicago papers; and tariff papers for The Economist. She was the editor of the Iowa City Republican in 1901.

=== The Great School of Natural Science ===
In 1887, Huntley became the first instructed student of John Emmett Richardson (pen name, TK). From 1894, the "Work" commanded her undivided time and effort. The Dream Child, the first result of that interest, was written in 1889, and published in Boston, 1892. The books stands for the earlier, more poetic, and less exact treatment of the "Great Law" than her later writings.

Huntley then engaged on a series of writings on the system of science and philosophy intended to connect the demonstrated and recorded knowledge of ancient spiritual schools with the discovered and published facts of the modern physical school of science. These books included Harmonics of Evolution, The Great Psychological Crime, The Destructive Principle of Nature in Individual Life, The Constructive Principle of Individual Life, and others, being a series of publications of the Indo-American Book Co., of Chicago. The publications and her editorial management were the result of her researches in the realm of the occult philosophy, which she termed The Great School of Natural Science, and which researches caused her to abandon her early materialistic life, and to adopt a belief in life after physical death, which she held that her philosophy demonstrated scientifically. Huntley's series of writings on the system of science and philosophy was the result of her researches in the realm of the occult philosophy, which she termed the School of Natural Science, and which research caused her to abandon her early materialism, and to adopt a belief in life after physical death, which she held that her philosophy demonstrated scientifically.

== The Dream Child ==
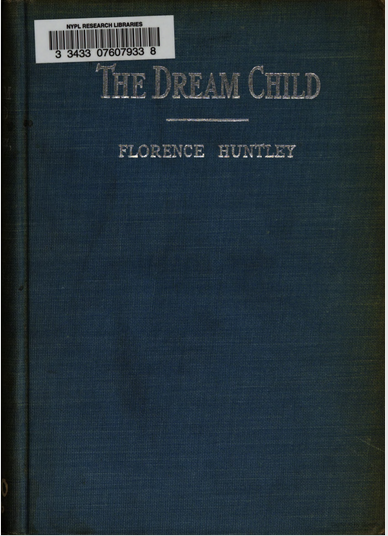
The Dream Child

Huntley's The Dream Child, a study of occult phenomena, was published in 1892 by the Arena Publishing Company, Boston. The story was written to especially set forth the philosophic truth of universal brotherhood and endless progression. After years of study and investigation, Huntley sought answers to the two age-long problems "What is Truth?" and "If a man die shall he live again?" The philosophy described in The Dream Child was the view of Huntley, with the profound belief that the philosophy enunciated is the Truth. According to the Cleveland Daily Leader, "Florence Huntley has taken a fancy to depict the life to come. In this little book, nearly perfect but for a lack of the requisite imagination to firmly place before the reader the heavens and what they hold, a very daring project, a mother, after losing her daughter, goes into a mysterious trance-like condition, in which she sees and communications with the child in heaven. This continues for a good many years, until the child grows to girlhood, when a change in her surroundings makes it necessary for them to separate."

The novel opens by a conversation between two eminent physicians in an insane asylum. A beautiful woman had attracted the attention of the visiting physician. The strange story of her life is given in succeeding chapters, carrying the reader from story to philosophy, from pure description to metaphysical speculation without any break in continuity of thought. The story is not startling, and it has few strong dramatic passages. By stages, the reader is carried from the world of the physical into the realm of dreams. At one moment, he is with Mr. and Mrs. Varien; the next, he finds himself peering into the beyond, gazing through the entranced vision of Mrs. Varien on the daily life of the little child which died when only three years old. The life story of Mrs. Varien is set as an odd tale. During the day, she is the same as other people, while at night, for 15 years, she is entranced, and her soul dwells with her child. In this other world, many life mysteries are explained. Many passages, especially the utterances of the mystic master, resemble prose poems. The chapters which aid in forming a conception of the character of the work include: "Doctors Agree," "She Dreamed a Dream," "The Dream World," "The Beginning of the End," "Science Fails," "The Watch," "The Voice of the Master," "A Star Was Shining," "A Strange Quest," "The Gates Are Passed," "A Successful Experiment," "Such is the Law," "Whom God Hath Joined," "For all Eternity," "An Innumerable Company."

== Personal life ==
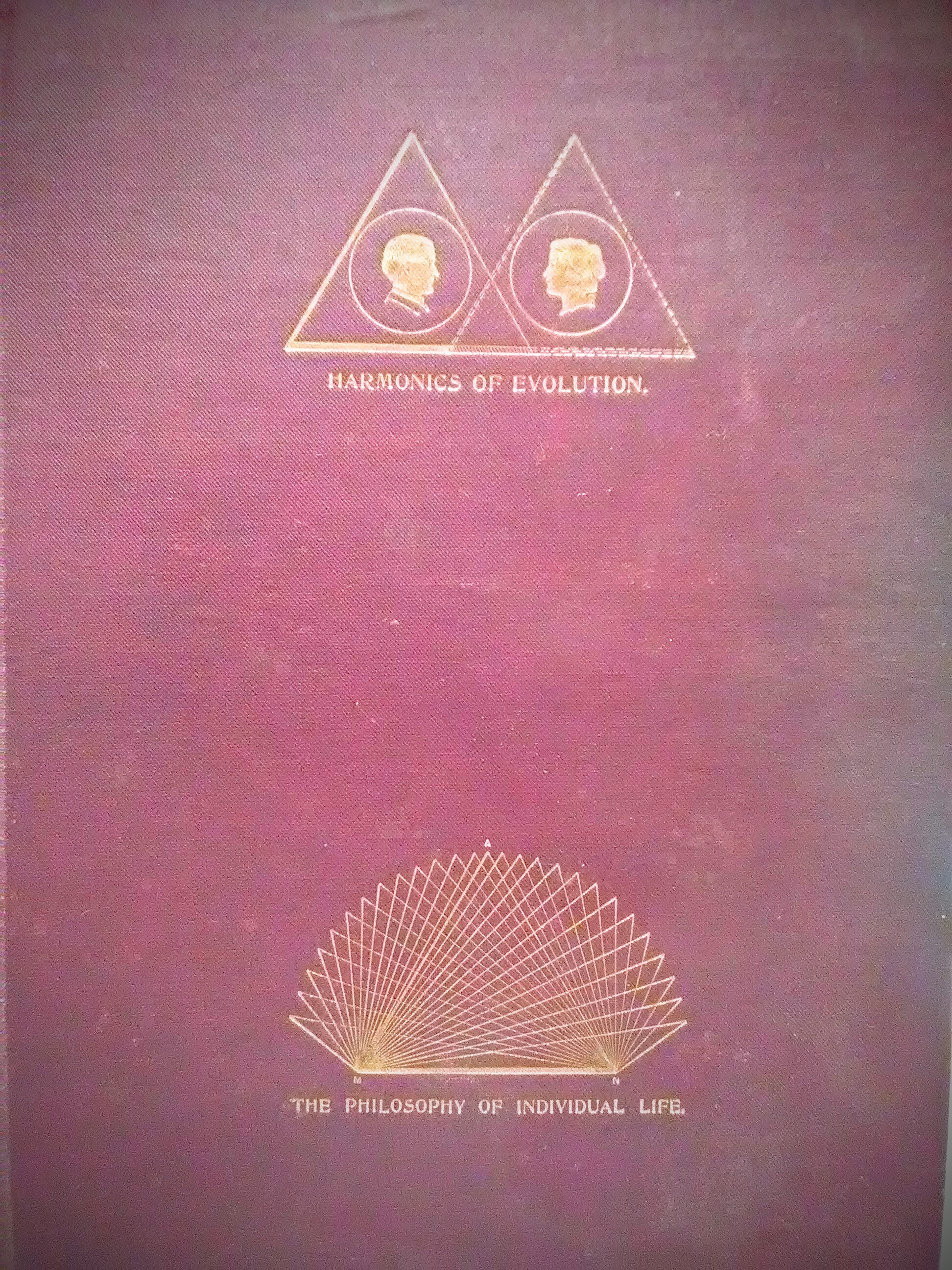
Harmonics of Evolution by Florence Huntley, 1897

Huntley was the brains behind Richardson's entire literary success—such as it was. She was an educated, trained, talented, successful newspaper woman; an altruist, a philosopher, a thinker, and a genius for dissecting and analyzing intricate psychological problems. Huntley edited everything of any merit that TK ever wrote. He produced nothing after "The Great Work," in 1906. Huntley and Richardson married on January 30, 1910, 23 years after their first meeting. For 18 years before the marriage, she had lived with an intense devotion to what she sincerely believed to be a great work for humanity.[Found later to be false see PDf 'For the Record']-> [But a short time before her death, she became aware of TK's real nature, the awful consequences of his destructive influences, together with her own part in carrying them out.] With this recognition, for several days, she wept, and finally on January 28, 1912, she began to experience a severe headache, a few hours later lapsing into unconsciousness which lasted nearly four days.

She died at home in Oak Park, Illinois, on February 1, 1912.

== Selected works ==
- The Dream Child, 1892
- Harmonic series, 1897–1915
- Harmonics of Evolution. The philosophy of individual life, based upon natural science, as taught by modern masters of the law ... Third edition, 1903
- The great psychological crime : the destructive principle of nature in individual life (1906)
- The great work : the constructive principle of nature in individual life, 1906 (with J. E. Richardson)
- Harmonics of evolution : the philosophy of individual life, based upon natural science, as taught by modern masters of the law (1915)
- Who answers prayer?, (1915)
- The Gay Gnani of Gingalee : or, Discords of Devolution A Tragical Entanglement of Modern Mysticism and Modern Science
