= Flora Haines Loughead =

American writer, farmer, and miner

Flora Loughead
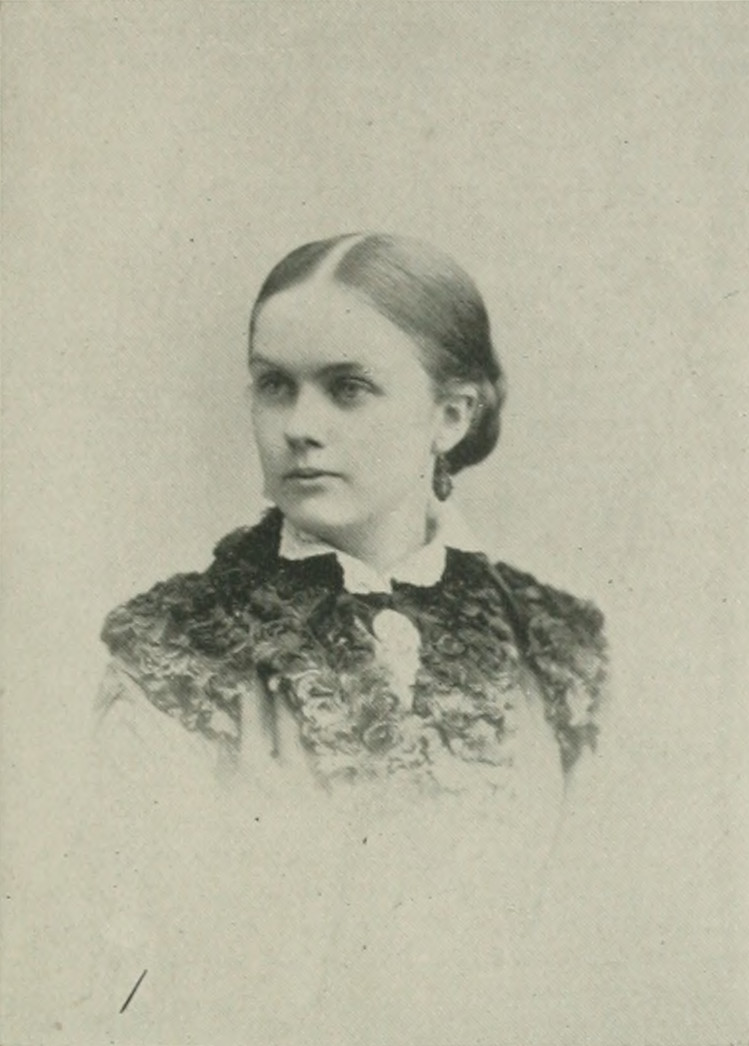
- Flora Haines Loughead in her 20s
- Born: Flora Haines; July 12, 1855; Milwaukee, Wisconsin, U.S.
- Died: January 27, 1943 (aged 87); Alameda County, California, U.S.
- Resting place: Mountain View Cemetery, Oakland, California, U.S.
- Education: Lincoln College
- Occupations: writer, farmer, mine owner
- Spouse(s): Charles E. Apponyi; John Loughead; David A. Gutierrez

Flora Haines Loughead (later, Flora Gutierrez; 1855–1943) was an American writer, farmer, and miner from Wisconsin. She became the "Opal Queen" of Virgin Valley. Flora's son Allan was the founder of American aerospace company the Lockheed Corporation.

== Early years and education ==
Flora Haines was born in Milwaukee, Wisconsin, in 1855 to parents who were natives of Maine. She attended school in Columbus, Wisconsin, and in Lincoln, Illinois, graduating from Lincoln College in June, 1872, with the degree of A. B.

When Haines was fifteen years old, and still a schoolgirl, she secretly wrote a story and sent it to The Aldine. The editor, Richard Henry Stoddard, returned the manuscript to her, suggesting that she forward it the Harper and Appleton periodicals, as the Aldine had accepted enough manuscripts for two or three years. Her manuscript and the letter from Stoddard went to the bottom of her trunk and were hidden there for years.

== Career ==
=== Writer ===
Her newspaper work began in 1873 on the Chicago Inter Ocean. In 1874 and 1875, she was on several of the Denver newspapers. While there, she became acquainted with Helen Hunt Jackson, who was afterwards one of her most intimate friends. During Mrs. Jackson's fatal illness, Loughead was in daily attendance to the end.

With her first marriage, she moved to San Francisco where she had three children. Her first book was called Libraries of California and it was a guide to the libraries of the state in 1878. It went out of print and was marked "rare" in catalogues. Between 1878 and 1882, and again from 1884 to 1886, she supported herself by writing for the San Francisco dailies. She published a number of excellent short stories in the Ingleside, the San Franciscan, "The Argonaut", Drake's Magazine, the Chicago Current, and the Overland Monthly. She began to write stories in earnest in 1883.

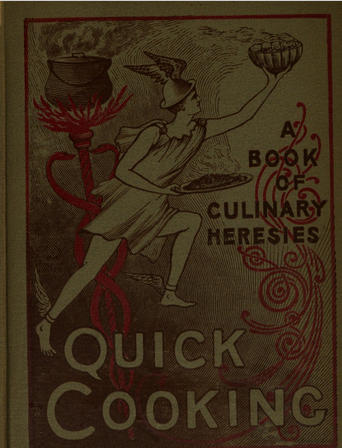
Quick Cooking

In 1886, she married again to John Loughead (pronounced "Lockheed"). John adopted the children from her first marriage. Two of those children, May and Victor, grew to be adults. The same year, she published Hand-book of Natural Science. She then turned her hand to fiction with The Man Who was Guilty, which initially had local reputation, before being taken up by a Boston house in 1886. In the same year, she published The Black Curtain. In 1889, she published a housekeeper's book on Quick Cooking: A Book of Culinary Heresies for the Busy Wives and Mothers of the Land. By this time, she was bringing up two more children, Malcolm (born 1886) and Allan (born 1889).

While living in Santa Barbara, California in the early 1890s, she wrote for the syndicates, as well as occasional correspondence in the New York Post. She edited a volume of "Hebrew Folk-Lore Tales" and wrote a California story, "The Abandoned Claim," published in 1891. "The Abandoned Claim" was quite unlike the noteworthy novel of "The Man who was Guilty." It was a simple and winning story of the five years' experiment of two brothers and a sister in developing an abandoned claim in California. The account of their labors, successes, and occasional reverses, was interesting and inspiring. A romantic element was added in the mystery which enveloped the career of a man who befriended them, and in some of their own experiences. "The man from Nowhere" (San Francisco, C. A. Murdock & Co., 1891) was the first of a series of short stories by Loughead, issued every month, in uniform style and averaging about the same length. Many of these stories had been previously printed. The inaugural issue was a story of an inventor who, when just upon the brink of success, was injured in the head by the bursting of an engine, then spending 16 years in an insane asylum.

=== Mining ===
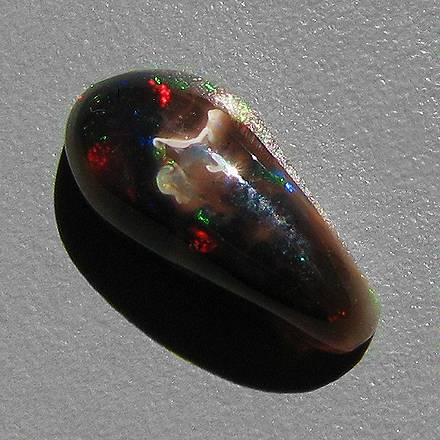
Nevada's Virgin Valley is a source for precious black opal gemstones and replacing woods

Her next career started in 1915 when she was sent to investigate the discovery of opals in Virgin Valley, Nevada, 400 miles (640 km) from San Francisco. She was reporting for the San Francisco Chronicle but she decided to buy 15 claims years after homesteading on Sagebrugh Creek at the Green Fire Mine (Sinkakis- Gemstones of North America). In 1916, she gained financial backing from Mrs Gardiner Hammond and proceeded to mine at the location of the future Rainbow Ridge Mine. Loughead moved to Cedarville where she was school teacher and raised her sons around people. She mined for opals for the rest of her life until her son moved her out of her house on Sagebrush Creek Rd. She became known as the "Opal Queen" owning the Rainbow, Stonetree and Bonanza mines and the "Giant Tree" Opal Claim later renamed the Stone Tree. She sold the latter in about 1918 and concentrated on the Rainbow and Bonanza mines.

== Personal life ==
Her first son Victor Loughead was a pioneer airman and wrote two books on flying. Allan and Malcolm were both involved in making aircraft and Allan particularly was involved with creating what would become the Lockheed Corporation. Flora married again when she was 53 (circa 1908) to a Mr. Gutierrez.

Loughead died in 1943 and is buried at Mountain View Cemetery in Oakland, California.

== Selected works ==
- The Loan of a Name
- The Story of the Pozzuolana House
- A Soldier under Garibaldi
- In the Garden of Eden
- The Son of a Convict
- Scientific Reports on Spiritualistic and Kindred Phenomena
- The Animated Chimney
- Sealskin Annie
- In the Shadow of The Live-Oak
- Counsel Must Hang Too
- A Strange Voyage
- The House on the Hill
- Before the Black Cap Went On
- Miss Hetty's Carpet
- Volunteer Joe
- John Mitchell's Indictment
- Brander's Wife, A Christmas Story
- The Natural sciences : a hand-book prepared for the use of Pacific Coast students : containing simple directions, contributed by leading scientists, to collectors and preservers of specimens, 1886
- Quick cooking : a book of culinary heresies for the busy wives and mothers of the land, 1887
- The Gold dust series, 1891-
- A keramic study; a chapter in the history of half a dozen dinner plates, 1895
- The black curtain, 1898
- Life, Diary, and Letters of Oscar Lovell Shafter, Associate Justice, Supreme Court of California ... Edited ... by Flora Haines Loughead. [With portraits.]., 1915
- The abandoned claim, 1919
- Dictionary of given names, 1934
