= Malcolm Lockheed =

American aviation engineer (1887–1958)

- Born: Malcolm Loughead; November 11, 1887; Niles, California, U.S.
- Died: August 12, 1958 (aged 71); San Andreas, California, U.S.
- Resting place: Protestant Cemetery (8592 Center Street), Mokelumne Hill, California
- Occupation: Engineer
- Known for: Lockheed Corporation
- Parent: Flora Haines Loughead (mother)
- Family: Allan Lockheed (brother)

Order of the Crown (Belgium)
- Date: 1919
- Country: Belgium
- Presented by: Albert I of Belgium
- Website: Official website

Precedence
- Next (higher): Order of Leopold (Belgium)
- Next (lower): Order of Leopold II

Malcolm Lockheed (né Malcolm Loughead; November 11, 1887 – August 12, 1958) was an American aviation engineer and inventor. He invented the hydraulic brake and, with his brother Allan Lockheed, produced the Model G, the first successful tractor seaplane. In 1926 the brothers also founded the Lockheed Aircraft Company, which went on in 1995 to become Lockheed Martin.

== Early life ==
Malcolm Loughead was born in 1887 to Flora Haines and John Loughead in Niles, California. He had a half-brother Victor, a sister Hope and a brother Allan. Malcolm and his brothers enjoyed playing with kites in Santa Barbara, California, where Flora had moved with her children after separating from John. After she moved for a second time to a fruit ranch near Alma, California, the boys met John J. Montgomery, who showed them his experiments in aerodynamics. Flora taught the children how to read, but they did not receive formal schooling past the elementary level.

== Career ==
In 1904 Loughead obtained a job as a mechanic for the White Steam Car Company in San Francisco, where his brother Allan joined him in 1906.

In 1912 Malcolm and Allan, with the financial support of the Alco Taxicab Company and its owner Max Mamlock, founded the Alco Hydro-Aeroplane Company. Over the next eighteen months the brothers worked on creating the Model G seaplane, which was finished in June 1913 and became the "first successful tractor seaplane". It was also the only aircraft the company ever produced. They gave people rides in the Model G during the Panama-Pacific Exposition, a fair held in 1915 that celebrated the "completion of the Panama Canal and San Francisco's successful recovery from the disastrous 1906 earthquake". The Alco Hydro-Aeroplane Company shut down in 1916, after the Exposition had concluded.

Later in 1916 the brothers founded the Loughead Aircraft Manufacturing Company in Santa Barbara. This company shuttered in 1921.

Malcolm Loughead's 1917 patent application for his hydraulic braking system

Loughead modified the mechanical brakes of his time, which used a rod to apply force to the brakes, to use a hydraulic system instead. He claimed in his patent application that the force the rod applied was uneven and tended to shift between the wheels whenever an automobile moved. In his design a plunger used fluid to apply self-balancing force hydraulic pressure evenly to the brakes, so that the force could not shift. He patented his new design in 1917. These Lockheed hydraulic brakes were adopted by Duesenberg for their 1921 Model A. Loughead continued to revise the braking system and applied for 21 more patents for it, one of which was filed in Canada, between the years 1917 and 1924.

In 1919, Malcolm and Allan were awarded the Order of the Golden Crown by King Albert of Belgium.

In 1922 Loughead, who had recently moved to Detroit, Michigan, filed for a patent for the flexible hose that streamed fluid into the hydraulic brake's plunger. It was reinforced with an incompressible tube inside of it so that changes in pressure would not cause it to expand outward and thereby impede the brake's operation.

Because people kept mispronouncing Loughead as "log-head", Malcolm and Allan Loughead began to respell their surname as "Lockheed" and established the Lockheed Aircraft Company in 1926 under the new spelling.

Gold mining drew Lockheed to Mokelumne Hill, California, in 1930; however, the profits from his investment disappeared in 1942 after the US government banned mining that did not contribute to the nation's war effort during World War II.

== Personal life ==
Lockheed was married (1928) to Tilda Elvina Flom (1900-1979). In his later years he ran a jewelry shop, where he made custom jewelry, in Mokelumne Hill. He died at the Mark Twain Hospital in San Andreas, California, on August 12, 1958, at the age of 71. His body was interred in the Protestant Cemetery in Mokelumne Hill.

== Works cited ==
- Parker, Dana T. (2013). Building Victory: Aircraft Manufacturing in the Los Angeles Area in World War II. ISBN 9780989790604.
- Borth, Christy (1945). Masters of Mass Production. Indianapolis, IN: Bobbs-Merrill Co.
- Yenne, Bill (1987). Lockheed. [New York] : Crescent Books : distributed by Crown Publishers. ISBN 978-0-517-60471-7.
- Abbott, Malcolm J.; Bamforth, Jill (2020). The early development of the aviation industry: entrepreneurs of the sky (First issued in paperback ed.). Routledge, Taylor & Francis Group. ISBN 978-0-367-72960-8.
- Biddle, Wayne (1991). Barons of the sky. New York : Simon & Schuster. ISBN 978-0-671-66726-9.
- Wagner Electric Corp. v. Hydraulic Brake Co. (1934). Wagner Electric Corp. v. Hydraulic Brake Co., 269 MICH 560 (1934): Record.
