= Lockheed Model 14 Super Electra =

1930s American family of airliners

Model 14 Super Electra
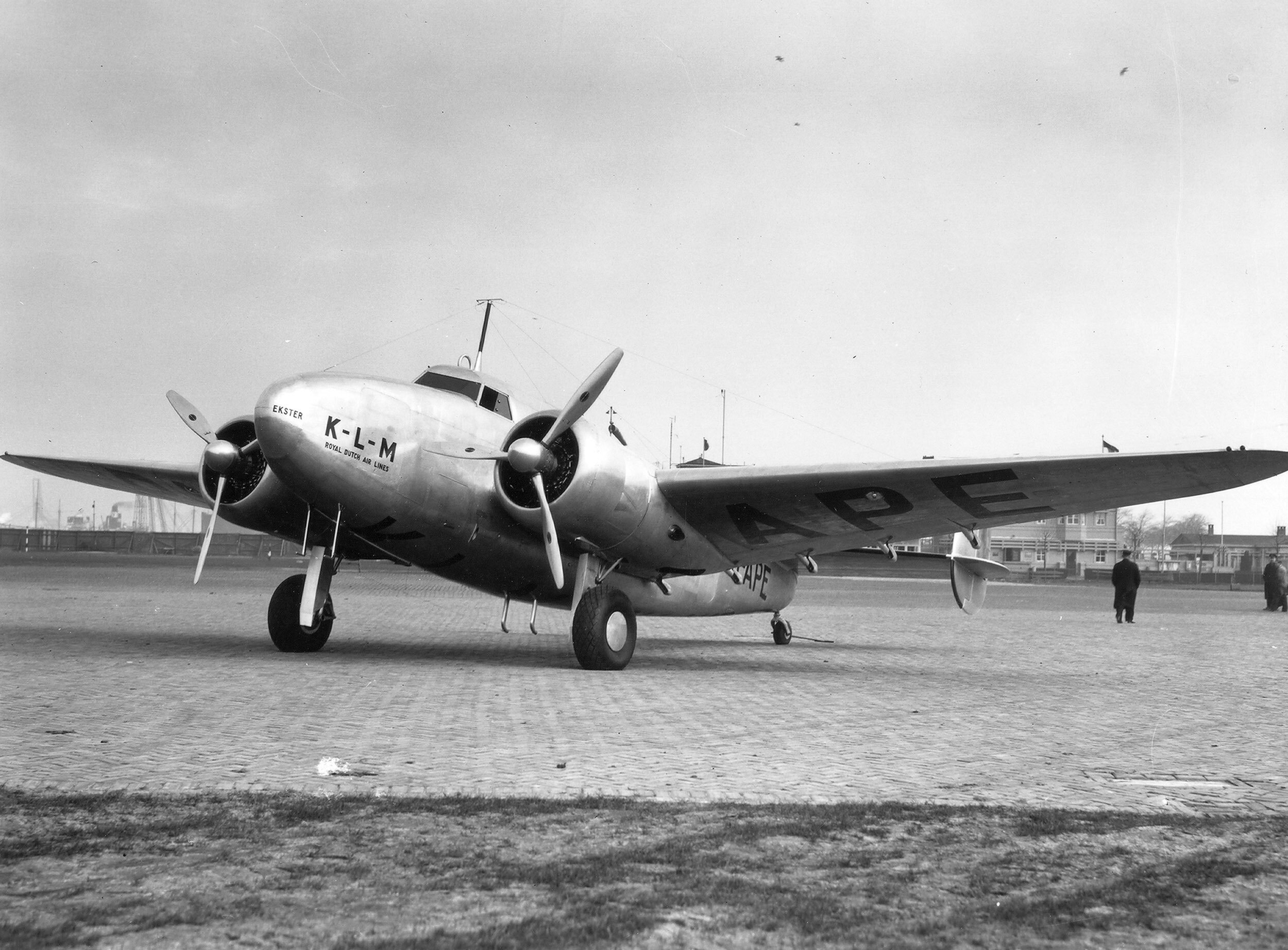
- KLM Lockheed 14

General information
- Type: Civil passenger and cargo transport
- Manufacturer: Lockheed Corporation
- Primary user: Airlines
- Number built: 354

History
- Introduction date: October 1937
- First flight: July 29, 1937
- Developed from: Lockheed Model 10 Electra
- Variants: Kawasaki Ki-56; Lockheed Hudson
- Developed into: Lockheed Model 18 Lodestar

The Lockheed Model 14 Super Electra was an American civil passenger and cargo aircraft built by the Lockheed Aircraft Corporation during the late 1930s. An outgrowth of the earlier Model 10 Electra, the Model 14 was also developed into larger, more capable civil and military versions.

== Design and development ==
The design, developed by a team led by Don Palmer, was a scaled-up version of the original Model 10 Electra, with passenger seating increased from 10 to 14. It was intended to compete commercially with the contemporary Douglas DC-2 and the Boeing 247. The first Model 14 flew on July 29, 1937, piloted by Marshall Headle. Early 14's used the Pratt & Whitney R-1690 Hornet engine; later the Wright R-1820 Cyclone 9 was offered as an option.

Lockheed built a total of 114 Model 14s; another 119 were built under license in Japan by the Tachikawa Aircraft Company under the designation Tachikawa Type LO Transport Aircraft Thelma. Another 121 were built by Kawasaki Aircraft Company under the designation Kawasaki Type 1 cargo transporter. The type 1's cargo fuselage was lengthened by 1.4 m (4 ft 7 in), enabling the fitting of larger cargo doors.

In Japan during the late 1930s and early 1940s, in common with most large economies of the time, research was being conducted into pressurised cabins for high-altitude flight. In similar fashion to the Lockheed XC-35, in the United States, Tachikawa incorporated a pressurised cabin into new forward and centre fuselage sections for one of the locally built Lockheed Type LO Transport Aircraft. The resulting research aircraft was given the long designation Tachikawa-Lockheed Type-B high altitude research aircraft and the company designation Tachikawa SS-1. The first conversion was completed in May 1943, re-engined with 2x 810 kW (1,080 hp) Mitsubishi Ha-102 14-cylinder radial engines. The two conversions carried out a brief flight testing programme.

== Operational history ==
The Model 14 entered commercial service with Northwest Airlines in the US in October 1937. Aircraft were exported for use by Aer Lingus of Ireland, British Airways and KLM of the Netherlands. The Model 14 was the basis for development of the Lockheed Hudson maritime reconnaissance and light bomber aircraft operated by the Royal Air Force, USAAF, United States Navy and many others during World War II.

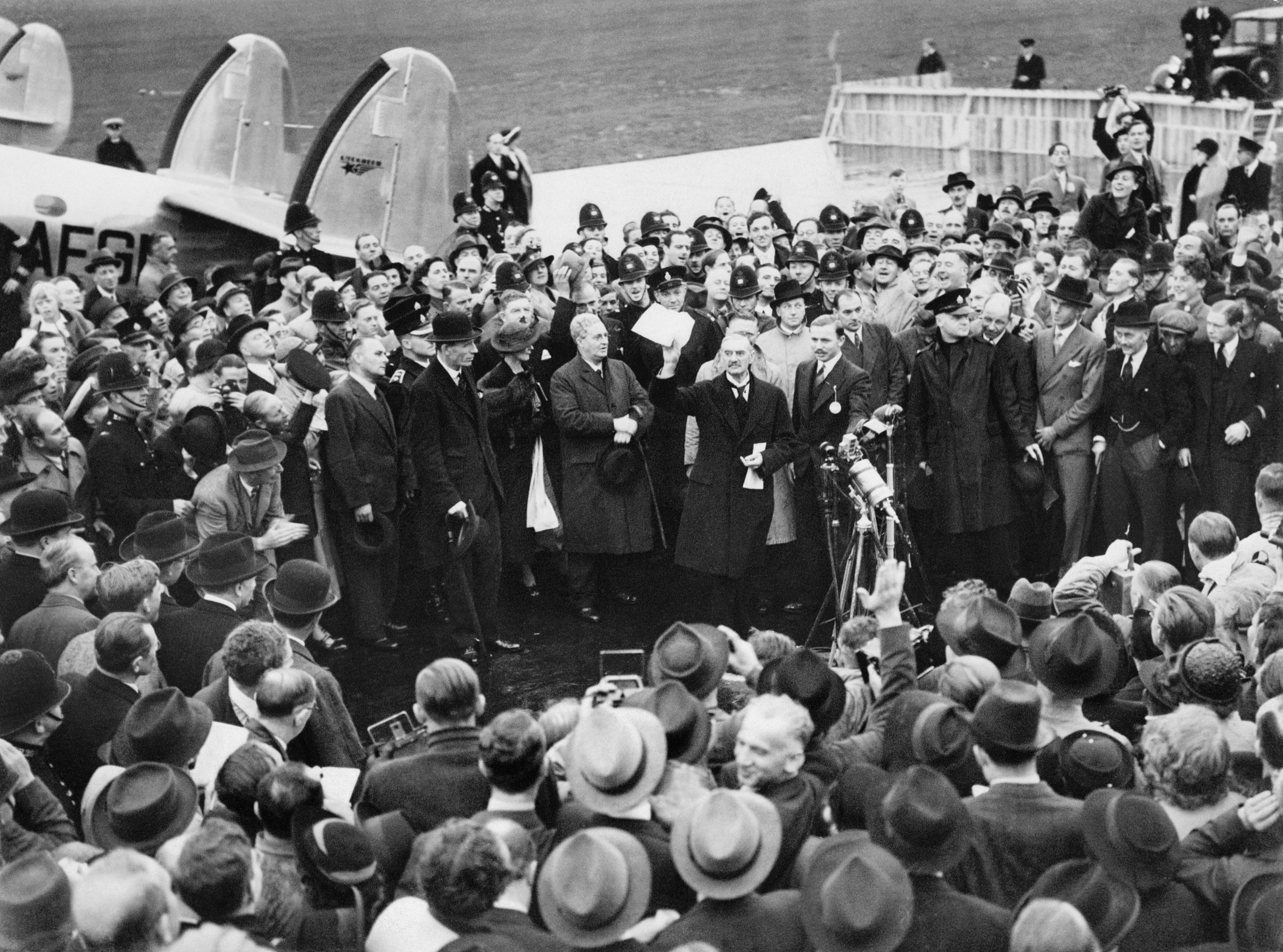
UK prime minister Chamberlain beside G-AFGN at Heston Aerodrome, 1938

In 1938, British prime minister Neville Chamberlain, after signing the Munich Agreement, returned to London Heston Airport on board a British Airways Lockheed 14, and was famously photographed beside the aircraft (registration G-AFGN), showing to the crowd the signed document, which he would later that day describe as bringing "peace for our time".

=== Record-breaking flights ===
In May 1938, a team of aviators of the Polish airline LOT, made up of Wacław Makowski, director of LOT and first pilot, Zbigniew Wysiekierski, second pilot, Szymon Piskorz, mechanic and radionavigator, Alfons Rzeczewski, radio-navigator and Jerzy Krassowski, assistant, accomplished an experimental flight from the United States to Poland. This flight was carried out on board one of the aircraft bought by LOT, manufactured by Lockheed in California, a Lockheed Model 14H Super Electra (of which the Polish registration was SP-LMK.). The crew took off from Burbank (Los Angeles) where these aircraft were manufactured, and after a tour of South America, flew the Atlantic from Brazil to West Africa en route to Warsaw. A poster celebrating the flight can be seen in a US Library of Congress/Matson Archive photo of the LOT/Imperial Airways Sales office in Jerusalem about 1939.

The distance covered was of 15,441 mi (24,850 km; 13,418 nmi). They flew via the cities of Mazatlan, Mexico City, Guatemala, and Panama, then via the South American cities of Lima, Peru; Santiago, Chile; Buenos Aires, Argentina; and Rio de Janeiro and Natal in Brazil. They flew across the South Atlantic to Dakar, Senegal, in Africa and then to Casablanca, Tunis, and then on to Rome, Italy. The final leg of the flight brought them to Warsaw, Poland. The flying time was 85 hours between 13 May and 5 June. The overflight of the Atlantic - from Natal to Dakar - lasted 11 hours and 10 minutes (1,908 mi/3,070 km). This feat by Polish aviators marked the history of air communication on a world level. (Prior to this flight airliners were delivered across the Atlantic as deck cargo on ships).

Howard Hughes flew a Super Electra (NX18973) on a global circumnavigation flight. With four crewmates (Harry Connor, copilot; Tom Thurlow, navigator; Richard Stoddart, engineer; and Ed Lund, mechanic), the Lockheed 14 took off from Floyd Bennett Field in New York on July 10, 1938. The flight, which circled the narrower northern latitudes, passed through Paris, Moscow, Omsk, Yakutsk, Fairbanks, Alaska and Minneapolis before returning to New York. The total distance flown was 14,672 mi (23,612 km) and total time was 3 days, 19 hours, 17 minutes.

== Variants ==
Data from:Lockheed Aircraft since 1913

Model 14
The basic airliner version of the Super Electra, variants with cabin arrangement changes, engine types etc. denoted by an alpha-numeric suffix.
Model 14H
20 aircraft powered by 2x 875 hp (652 kW) Pratt & Whitney R-1690-S1E-G Hornet engines
Model 14H-2
32 aircraft powered by 2x 875 hp (652 kW) R-1690-S1E2-G engines, 12 of which were re-engined with 1,200 hp (890 kW) Pratt & Whitney R-1830-S1C3-G Twin Wasp engines to become 14-08s.
Model C-14H-1
A single 14-H (c/n 1401) converted with a bulged cabin roof and large freight door for carriage of bulky loads, later re-converted to 14-H for airline use in Brazil and Nicaragua.
Model 14-08
12 14H-2s re-engined with 1,200 hp (890 kW) R-1830-S1C3-G engines by Trans-Canada Air Lines (TCA)
Model 14-WF62
An exclusively export version powered by 2x 900 hp (670 kW) Wright SGR-1820-F62 Cyclone engines for British Airways (8), KLM (11) and Aer Lingus (2).
Model 14-WG3B
Another export version, a.k.a. 14-G3B, powered by 2x 900 hp (670 kW) GR-1820-G2B engines. With the exception of four aircraft delivered to Romania, all WG3Bs were delivered to Japan, either to Tachikawa Hikoki K.K. for re-sale or direct to the operator Nihon Hikoki K.K. (Greater Japan Airways Co. Ltd).
Model 14-N
Two aircraft were completed as personal transports as 14-Ns, powered by 2x 1,100 hp (820 kW) GR-1820-G105 engines.
Model 14-N2
One aircraft built for Howard Hughes, for a round-the-world flight, powered by 2x 1,100 hp (820 kW) GR-1820-G102 and fitted with auxiliary tanks in the cabin as well as, survival equipment, navigation equipment and communication equipment.
Model 14-N3
One aircraft with 2x 1,100 hp (820 kW) GR-1820-G105A engines
Lockheed Type LO Transport Aircraft
Long designation given to 30 Model 14-WG3B aircraft delivered by Lockheed for use by Nihon Koku K.K. (Greater Japan Airways Co. Ltd). Given the allied reporting name Toby.
C-111
Three civil Model 14s impressed in Australia. FY1944 serials assigned after the fact
XR4O-1
One L-14 (USN 1441, mfr. serial 1482) used as USN executive transport
Tachikawa Type LO Transport Aircraft
Japanese licence production of the Model 14-38 by the Tachikawa Aircraft Company Ltd (立川飛行機株式会社 Tachikawa Hikōki K.K.?) powered by 2x 900 hp (670 kW) Mitsubishi Ha-26-I 14 cylinder radial engines. The 119 production aircraft were given the allied reporting name Thelma.
Kawasaki Army Type 1 Freight Transport
Long designation of the Ki-56
Kawasaki Ki-56
Freight transport aircraft redesigned by Takei Doi at Kawasaki Kokuki Kogoyo K.K. (Kawasaki Aircraft Company), from the Type LO. Careful attention to weight reduction, a 1.5 m (4 ft 11 in) increase in rear fuselage length and power from 2x 950 hp (710 kW) Nakajima Ha-25 14-cylinder radial engines improved performance and handling. The 121 production aircraft were given the Allied reporting name Thalia.

== Operators ==
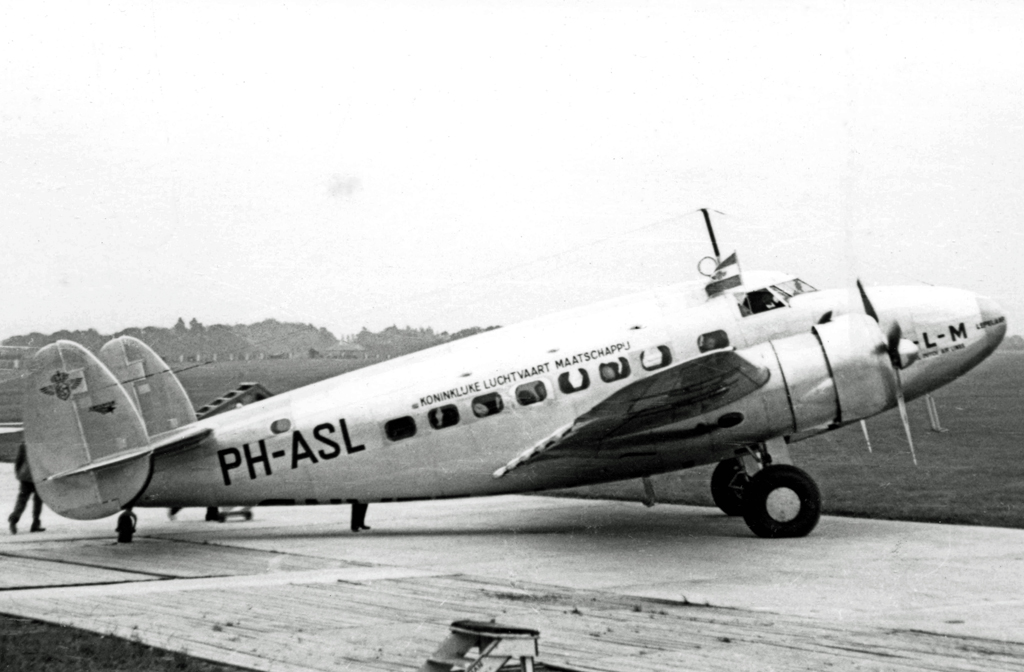
KLM operated two Lockheed 14s within Europe during 1938/39

=== Civilian ===
Australia

- Guinea Airways
- Qantas Empire Airways

Belgium

- SABENA (in Africa)
- John Mahieu Aviation (postwar)

Brazil

- Aerovias Brasil
- Linhas Aéreas Paulistas – LAP

Canada

- Trans-Canada Air Lines 16 Lockheed Super Electra 14H2, 12 modified to model 14-08 standard
- Canadian Pacific Air Lines

Dutch East Indies

- KNILM (Royal Dutch Indies Airways)

France

- Air Afrique (the prewar airline, unrelated to the postwar airline of the same name)
- Air France

Honduras

- TACA Airways System

Ireland

- Aer Lingus Teoranta

Japan

- Japan Air Transport (Nihon Kōkū Yusō KK)
- Imperial Japanese Airways (Dai Nippon Kōkū KK), which Japan Air Transport was merged into.

Manchukuo

- Manchuria Aviation Company operated an unknown number of Tachikawa Type LO aircraft.

Netherlands

- KLM (mostly for KLM's West Indian Section in the Caribbean)

Poland

- LOT Polish Airlines operated 10 aircraft between May 1938 and September 1939. Two aircraft (SP-BNG and SP-BNJ) crashed. When WWII started four aircraft (SP-BNH, SP-BPK, SP-BNE and SP-BPL) were evacuated to Romania and finally took over by LARES. One aircraft (SP-BPN) was interned in Estonia and three (SP-BNF, SP-BPM and SP-LMK) were evacuated to the United Kingdom. Two of them were taken over by BOAC in mid-1940.

Portugal

- DETA Mozambique Airways (serving Portugal's colony of Mozambique)

Romania

- LARES (Liniile Aeriene Române Exploatate cu Statul)

Trinidad and Tobago

- British West Indian Airways

United Kingdom

- British Airways Ltd. (not to be confused with the modern airline of the same name)
- BOAC (British Overseas Airways Corporation), which British Airways Ltd. was merged into.

United States

- Northwest Airlines
- Continental Air Lines
- Santa Maria Airlines

Venezuela

- Línea Aeropostal Venezolana (LAV)

=== Military ===
Canada

- Royal Canadian Air Force

Estonia

- Estonian Air Force operated one aircraft, ex-Polish SP-BPN interned on 4 September 1939. This Super Electra was used for VIP flights between 1939 and 1940.

Japan

- Imperial Japanese Army

South Africa

- South African Air Force

Soviet Union

- Soviet Air Force took over single ex-Polish Super Electra (ex SP-BPN) after seizing Estonia in 1940. Aircraft was crashed during takeoff from Riga to Moscow in October 1940. Wreck was still present on the airfield during German invasion in 1941.

United Kingdom

- Royal Air Force

United States

- United States Army Air Forces
- United States Navy

== Accidents and incidents ==
- On January 10, 1938, Northwest Airlines Flight 2, an L14H, crashed near Bozeman, Montana, due to structural failure caused by a design defect, killing all 10 passengers and crew on board.
- On May 16, 1938, a Northwest Airlines L14H2 (NC17394) struck Stroh Peak (near Saugus, California) while on a delivery flight, killing all nine on board.
- On July 8, 1938, Northwest Airlines Flight 4, an L14H (NC17383), stalled and crashed on takeoff from Billings Municipal Airport, killing one of 10 on board.
- On July 22, 1938, a LOT Polish Airlines L14H (SP-BNG) crashed near Stulpicani, Romania, killing all 14 on board; the cause was unknown, but the aircraft may have been struck by lightning.
- On November 18, 1938, a Trans-Canada Air Lines L14H2 (CF-TCL) crashed shortly after takeoff from Regina Airport, killing both pilots.
- On November 22, 1938, a British Airways Ltd. L14-WF62 (G-AFGO) crashed at Walton Bay, Somerset while on a test flight, killing both pilots Commander E. G. Robinson and Commander Robert P. J. Leborgne.
- On December 9, 1938, a KLM L14-WF62 (PH-APE, Ekster) crashed on takeoff from Schiphol Municipal Airport due to engine failure while on a training flight, killing all four on board.
- On January 13, 1939, Northwest Airlines Flight 1, an L14H, crashed on takeoff from Miles City Municipal Airport following a cockpit fire, killing all four on board.
- On January 18, 1939, a Guinea Airways L14H (VH-ABI, Koranga) crashed on takeoff from Tindal Airport following a loss of altitude, killing all four on board.
- On May 17, 1939, an Imperial Japanese Airways L14-WG3B (J-BCOZ) crashed on takeoff from Fukuoka Airport after the aircraft struck a fence, killing six of 11 on board.
- On December 21, 1939, a British Airways, Ltd. L14-WF62 (G-AFYU) ditched in the Mediterranean 300 mi off Alexandria, Egypt killing five of 11 on board.
- On January 22, 1940, a KNILM L14-WF62 (PK-AFO) crashed off Ngurah Rai Bali International Airport after losing altitude on takeoff, killing eight of nine on board.
- On April 22, 1940, a BOAC L14-WF62 (G-AFKD, Loch Invar) crashed near Loch Lomond, Scotland while being ferried from Perth International Airport to Heston Airport, killing all three crew on board.
- On November 10, 1940, RAF L14N2 AX688 stalled and crashed shortly after takeoff from Nairobi during bad weather, killing all on board.
- On February 6, 1941, a Trans-Canada Air Lines L14H2 (CF-TCP) crashed into trees while on approach to Armstrong Airport, killing all 12 passengers and crew on board.
- On February 20, 1941, Royal Air Force Hudson III T9449 suffered a double engine failure and crashed near Musgrave Harbour, Newfoundland. The pilot Captain Joseph Mackey survived, but the two other crew and the sole passenger, Canadian doctor, and Nobel Laureate, Sir Frederick Banting, died.
- On December 18, 1941, an Aeroflot L14H (CCCP-L3453) stalled and crashed near Khodynka Field following engine failure during a test flight, killing two of three on board.
- On August 22, 1942, a KLM West Indies Service L14-WF62 (PJ-AIP) crashed shortly after takeoff from Piarco Airport, killing all 13 on board.
- On December 20, 1942, a Canadian Pacific Air Lines L14H2 (CF-TPD) crashed into Mount William Knight, killing all 13 passengers and crew on board; the wreckage was found in August 1943.
- On January 13, 1943, an Air France L14H2 (F-ARRF) crashed at Aguelhok, Mali due to engine failure, killing all three crew on board.
- On May 19, 1943 RAF Hudson IIIA FH168 (c/n 414-6458) Crashed in attempted forced landing 7 miles south of RAF St Eval, England, as a result of engine failure. Two of the crew were killed, including, Air Commodore Sir Nigel Norman who was thrown from the aircraft and broke his neck. He was on his way to the Middle East for an airborne forces planning conference. Also killed in the crash was P/O (Obs) Arthur Rotenberg, J/16615 buried in St Columb Major Cemetery
- On August 26, 1943, a British West Indian Airways L14H (VP-TAH) burned out at Piarco Airport during refueling.
- On April 22, 1946, a TACA de Nicaragua B14S (AN-ACC) crashed on takeoff from La Libertad Airstrip, killing 18 of 21 on board in the deadliest accident involving the Super Electra.
- On October 29, 1948, an R.A Brand & Co. Ltd. L14-08 (G-AKPD) crashed off Elba, killing all four passengers and crew on board; the wreckage was found in March 1954 during the search for BOAC Flight 781.
- On July 14, 1951, an Airtaco L14H (SE-BTN) crashed on takeoff from Stockholm due to double engine failure caused by fuel starvation, killing four of six on board.
- On June 16, 1955, a TAPSA L14H2 (OB-QAG-338) crashed on takeoff from Tarapoto Airport due to loss of control after the cargo shifted, killing all three on board.

== Specifications (Model 14-WF62 Super Electra) ==
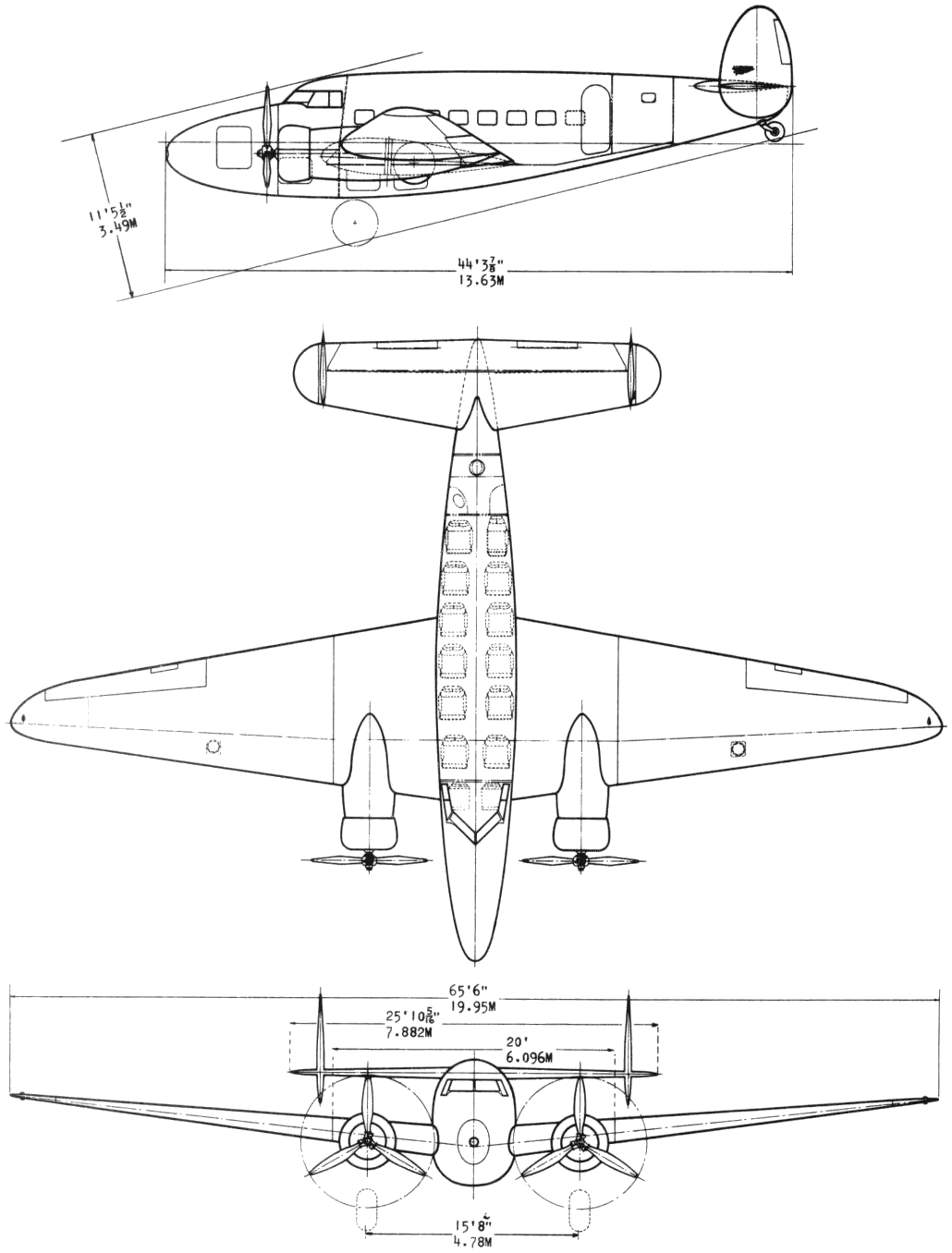
3-view drawing of the Lockheed Model 14 Super Electra

Data from Lockheed Aircraft since 1913.

General characteristics

- Crew: two
- Capacity: 12-14 passengers
- Length: 44 ft 4 in (13.51 m)
- Wingspan: 65 ft 6 in (19.96 m)
- Height: 11 ft 5 in (3.48 m)
- Wing area: 551.0 sq ft (51.19 m^{2})
- Empty weight: 10,750 lb (4,876 kg)
- Gross weight: 15,650 lb (7,099 kg)
- Max takeoff weight: 17,500 lb (7,938 kg)
- Fuel capacity: 644 US gallons (2,440 L; 536 imp gal)
- Powerplant: 2 × Wright SGR-1820-F62 Cyclone 9-cyl. air-cooled radial piston engines, 900 hp (670 kW) each

Performance

- Maximum speed: 250 mph (400 km/h, 220 kn) at 5,800 ft (1,800 m)
- Cruise speed: 215 mph (346 km/h, 187 kn)
- Range: 850 mi (1,370 km, 740 nmi) at max weight 17,500 lb (7,900 kg)
- Ferry range: 2,125 mi (3,420 km, 1,847 nmi)
- Service ceiling: 24,500 ft (7,500 m)
- Rate of climb: 1,520 ft/min (7.7 m/s)
- Wing loading: 28.4 lb/sq ft (138.7 kg/m^{2})
- Power/mass: 0.115 hp/lb (0.256 kW/kg)

== See also ==
- Lockheed L-188 Electra, an unrelated Lockheed airliner later bearing the same name

Related development

- Kawasaki Ki-56
- Lockheed Model 10 Electra
- Lockheed Model 12 Electra Junior
- Lockheed Model 18 Lodestar
- Lockheed Hudson

Related lists

- List of aircraft of World War II
- List of military aircraft of the United States
- List of United States Navy aircraft designations (pre-1962)
- List of Lockheed aircraft
