= Lockheed Model 10 Electra =

Twin-engined light airliner

Model 10 Electra
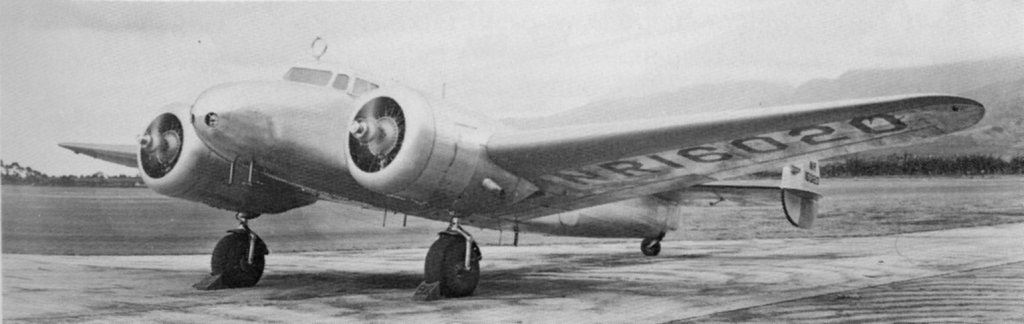
- Amelia Earhart and Fred Noonan's modified Electra 10E

General information
- Type: Light airliner
- Manufacturer: Lockheed
- Designer: Hall Hibbard
- Number built: 149

History
- Introduction date: 1935
- First flight: February 23, 1934
- Variant: Lockheed XC-35
- Developed into: Lockheed Model 12 Electra Junior; Lockheed Model 14 Super Electra

The Lockheed Model 10 Electra is an American twin-engined, all-metal monoplane airliner developed by the Lockheed Aircraft Corporation, which was produced primarily in the 1930s to compete with the Boeing 247 and Douglas DC-2. The type gained considerable fame after being flown by Amelia Earhart and Fred Noonan on their ill-fated around-the-world expedition in 1937.

== Design and development ==
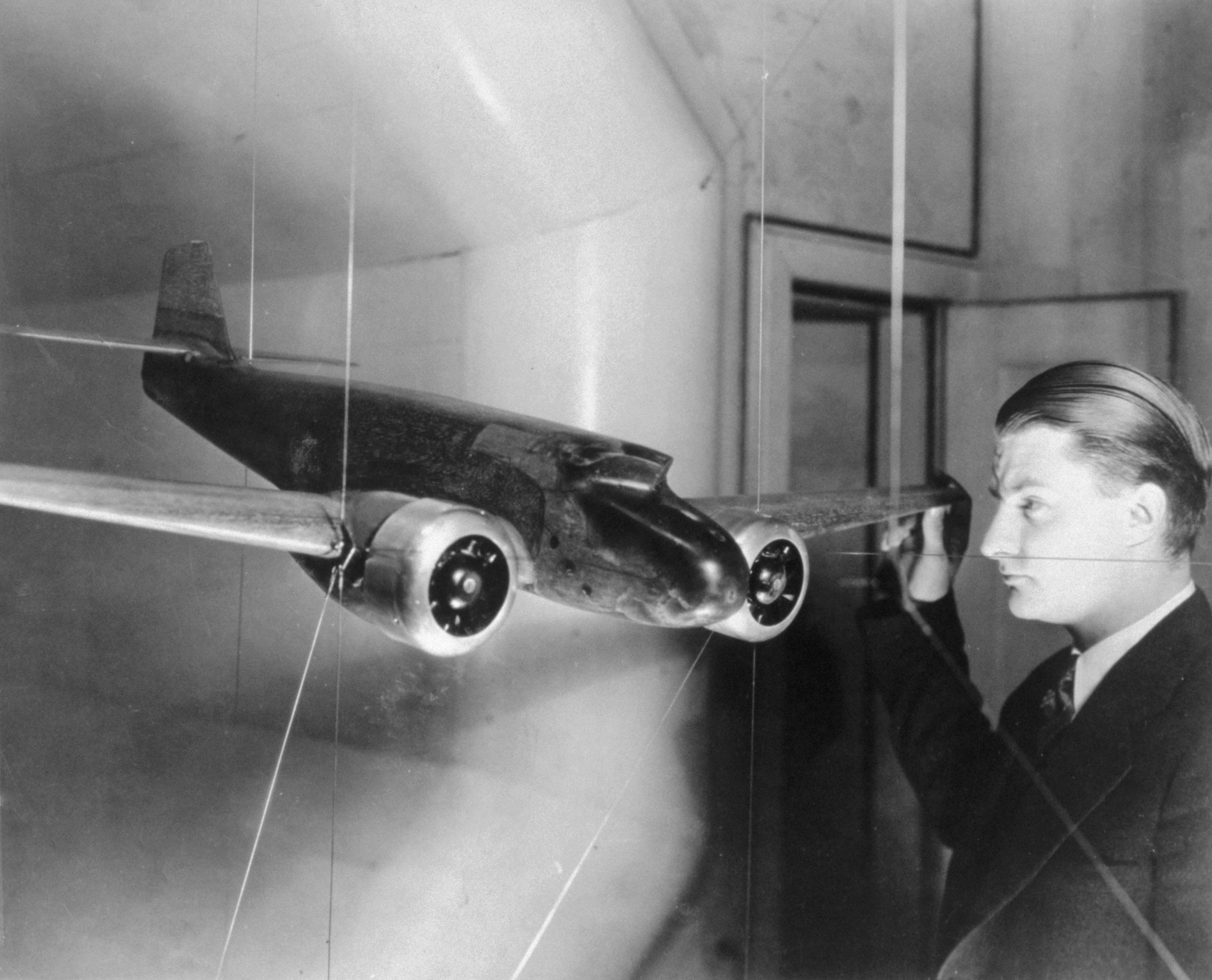
Clarence "Kelly" Johnson is testing an Electra model with single vertical tail and forward-sloping windshield in the University of Michigan's wind tunnel.

Some of Lockheed's wooden designs, such as the Orion, had been built by Detroit Aircraft Corporation with metal fuselages. However, the Electra was Lockheed's first all-metal and twin-engined design by Lloyd Stearman and Hall Hibbard. The name Electra came from a star in the Pleiades. The prototype made its first flight on February 23, 1934, with Marshall Headle at the controls.

Wind-tunnel work on the Electra was undertaken at the University of Michigan. Much of the work was performed by a student assistant, Kelly Johnson. He suggested two changes be made to the design: changing the single tail to double tails (later a Lockheed trademark), and deleting oversized wing fillets. Both of these suggestions were incorporated into production aircraft. Upon receiving his master's degree, Johnson joined Lockheed as a regular employee, ultimately leading the Skunk Works in developing advanced aircraft such as the Lockheed SR-71 Blackbird.

The Lockheed Electra was one of the first commercial passenger aircraft with retractable landing gear to come equipped with mudguards as standard equipment, although aircraft with fixed landing gear commonly had mudguards much earlier than this.

== Operational history ==
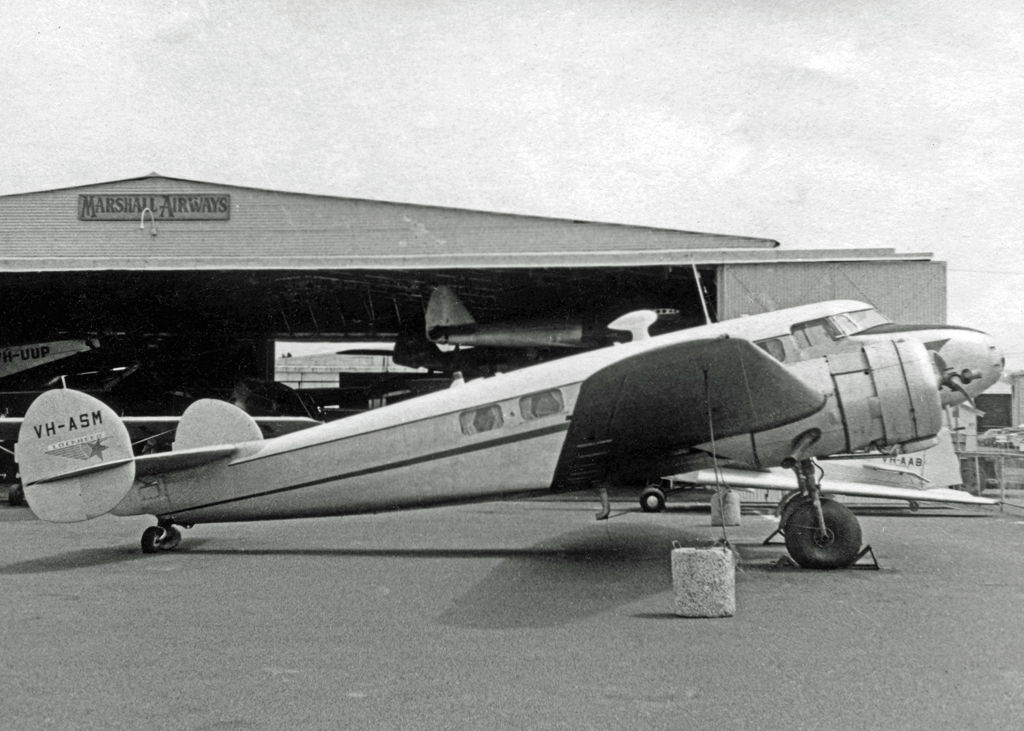
Marshall Airways (Australia) Lockheed 10B in 1970, originally delivered to Ansett Airways in 1937

After October 1934, when the US government restricted single-engined aircraft for use in carrying paying passengers, Lockheed was ready with its new Model 10 Electra. In addition to deliveries to US-based airlines, several European operators added Electras to their prewar fleets. In Latin America, the first airline to use Electras was Cubana de Aviación, starting in 1935, for its domestic routes.

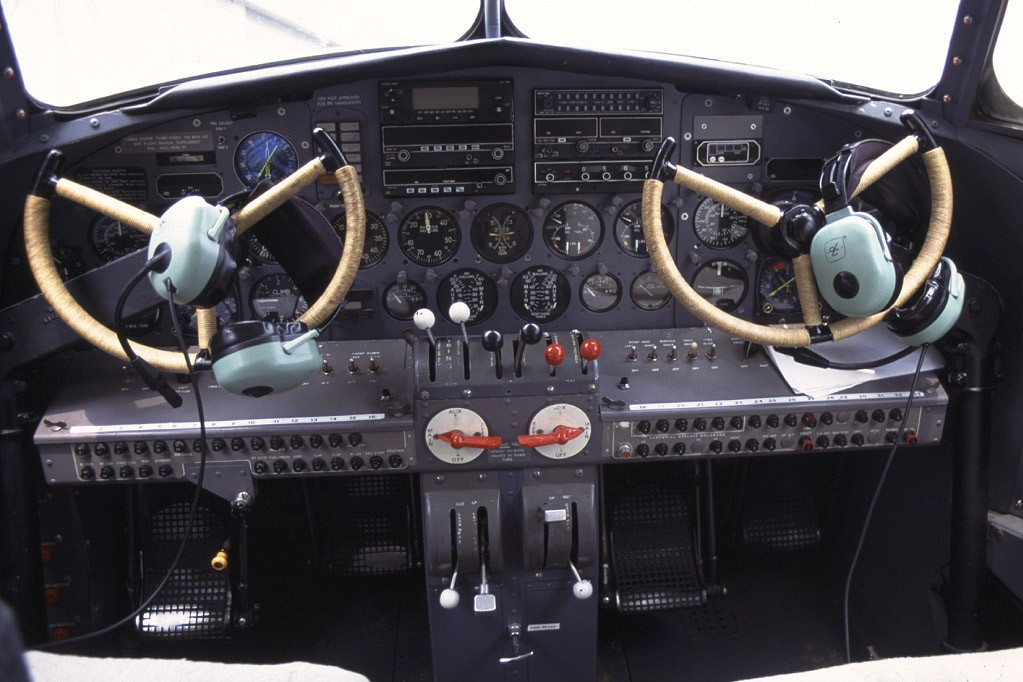
Flight deck of a Model 10A, which has been updated with a more modern instrument panel

Besides airline orders, a number of non-commercial civil operators also purchased the new Model 10. In May 1937, H. T. "Dick" Merrill and J. S. Lambie accomplished a round-trip crossing of the Atlantic Ocean. The feat was claimed to be the first round-trip commercial crossing of that ocean by an aircraft. It won them the Harmon Trophy. On the eastbound trip, they carried newsreels of the crash of the Hindenburg, and on the return trip from the United Kingdom, they brought photographs of the coronation of King George VI. Bata Shoes operated the Model 10 to ferry its executives between their European factories.

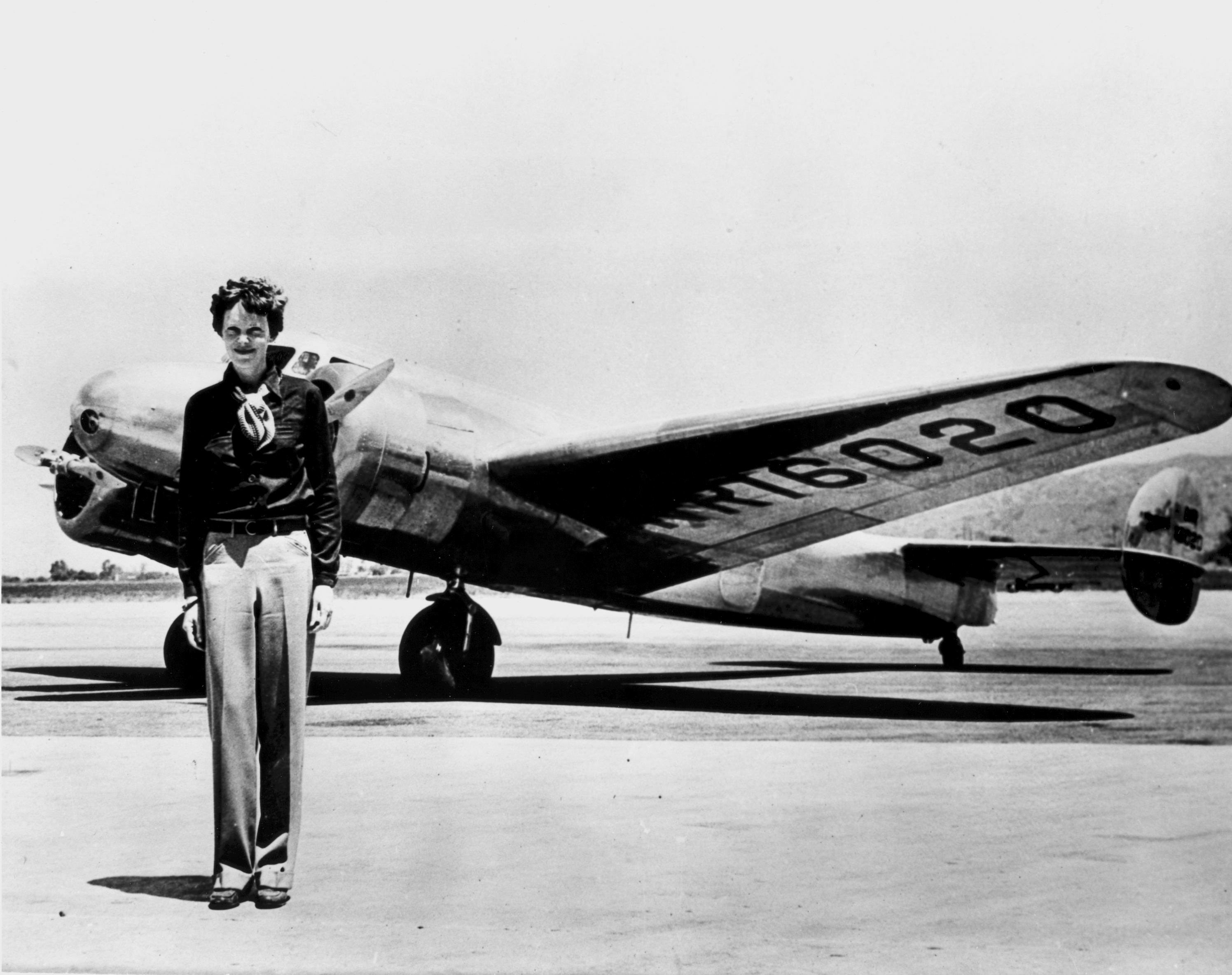
Earhart and her customized Lockheed Electra

Probably the most famous use of the Electra was the modified Model 10E flown by Amelia Earhart and Fred Noonan. In July 1937, they disappeared over the central Pacific Ocean during an attempted round-the-world flight.

Many Electras and their design descendants (the Model 12 Electra Junior and Model 14 Super Electra) were pressed into military service during World War II, for instance the USAAF's C-36. Many smaller airlines and charter services continued to operate Electras into the 1970s.

Electras were popular as private planes for royalty in Asia and Europe. In India, the Maharaja of Jammu and Kashmir and the Maharaja of Jodhpur both purchased them for their personal use in 1937.

== Variants ==
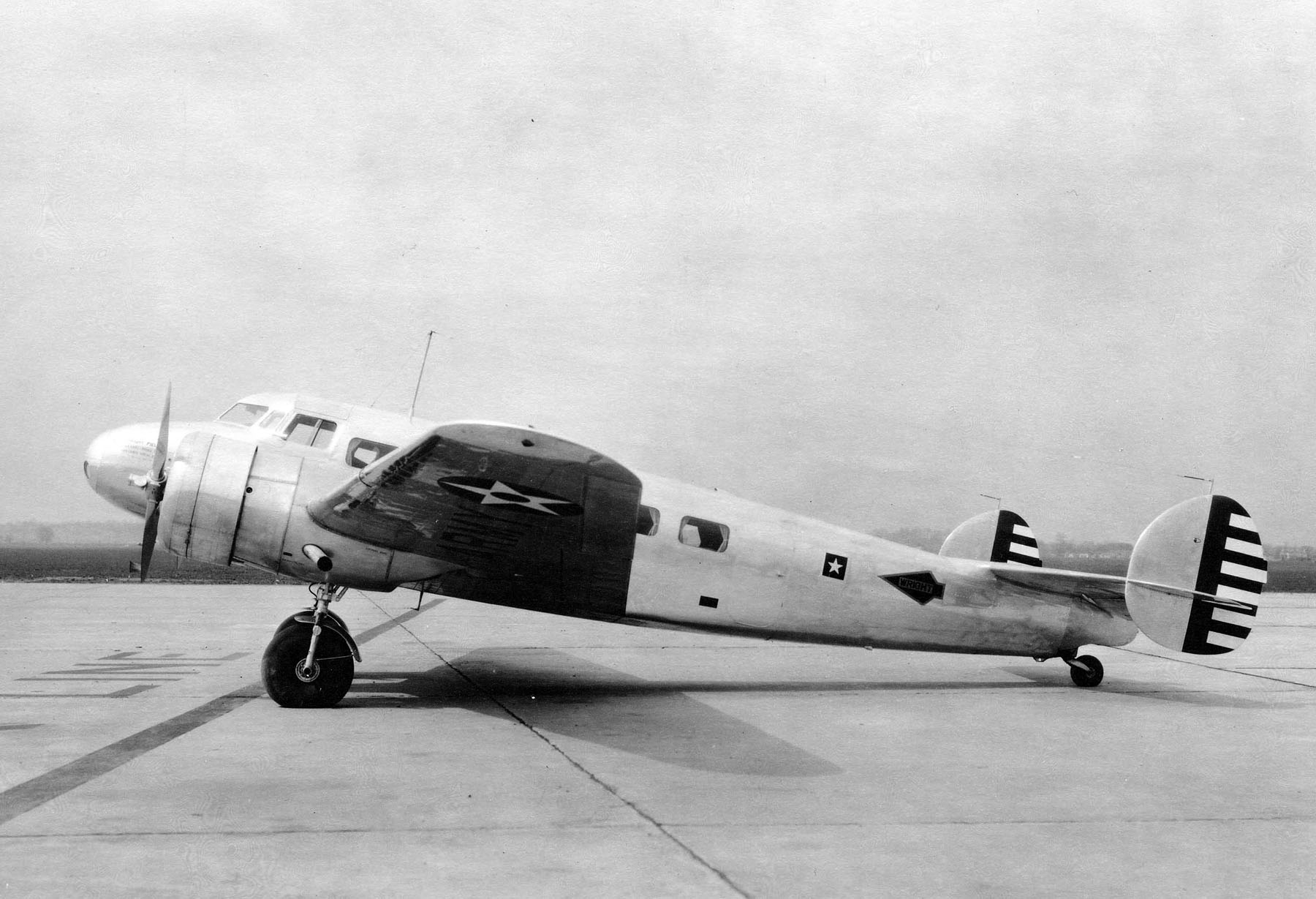
Lockheed Y1C-36

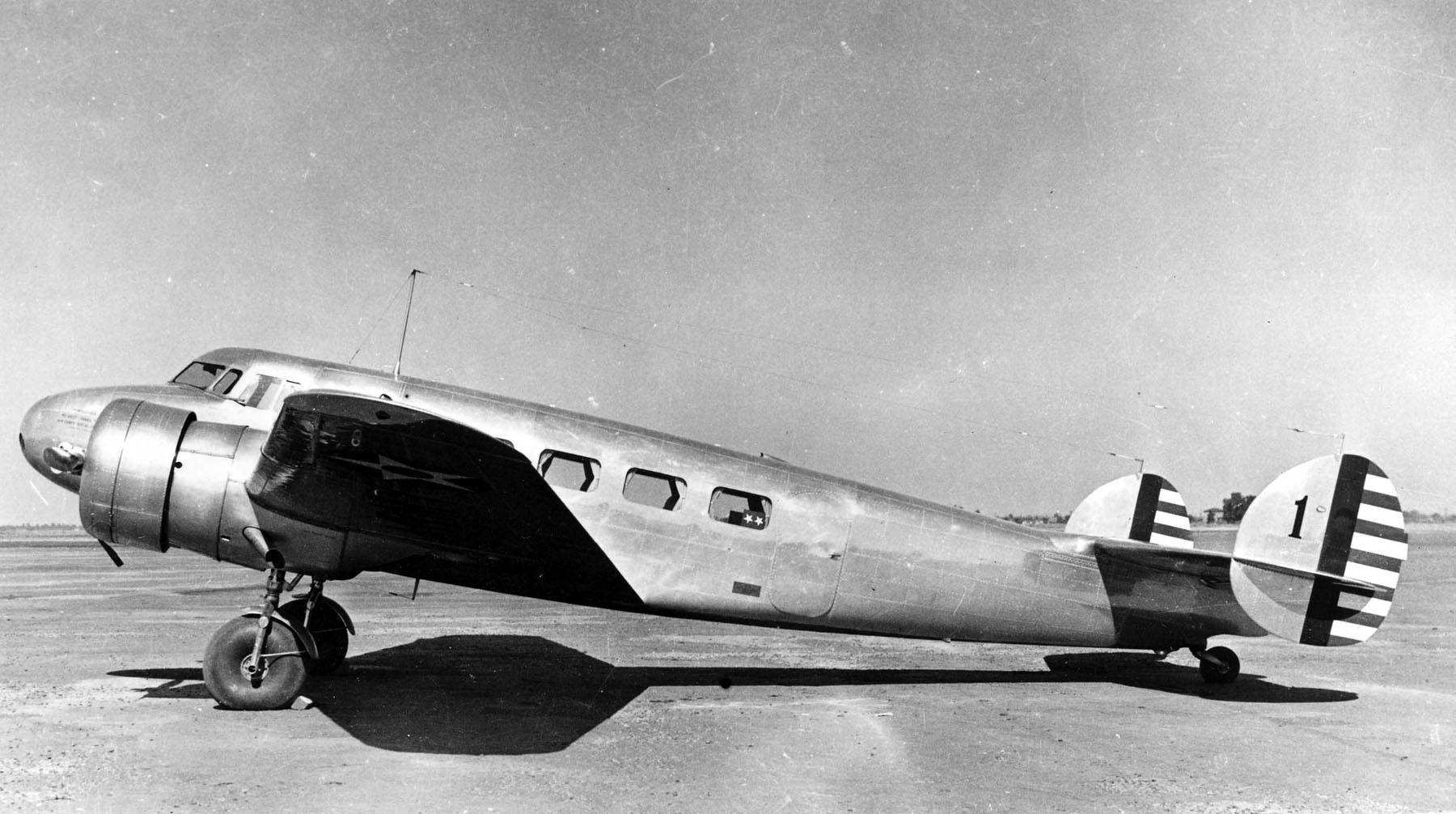
Lockheed Y1C-37

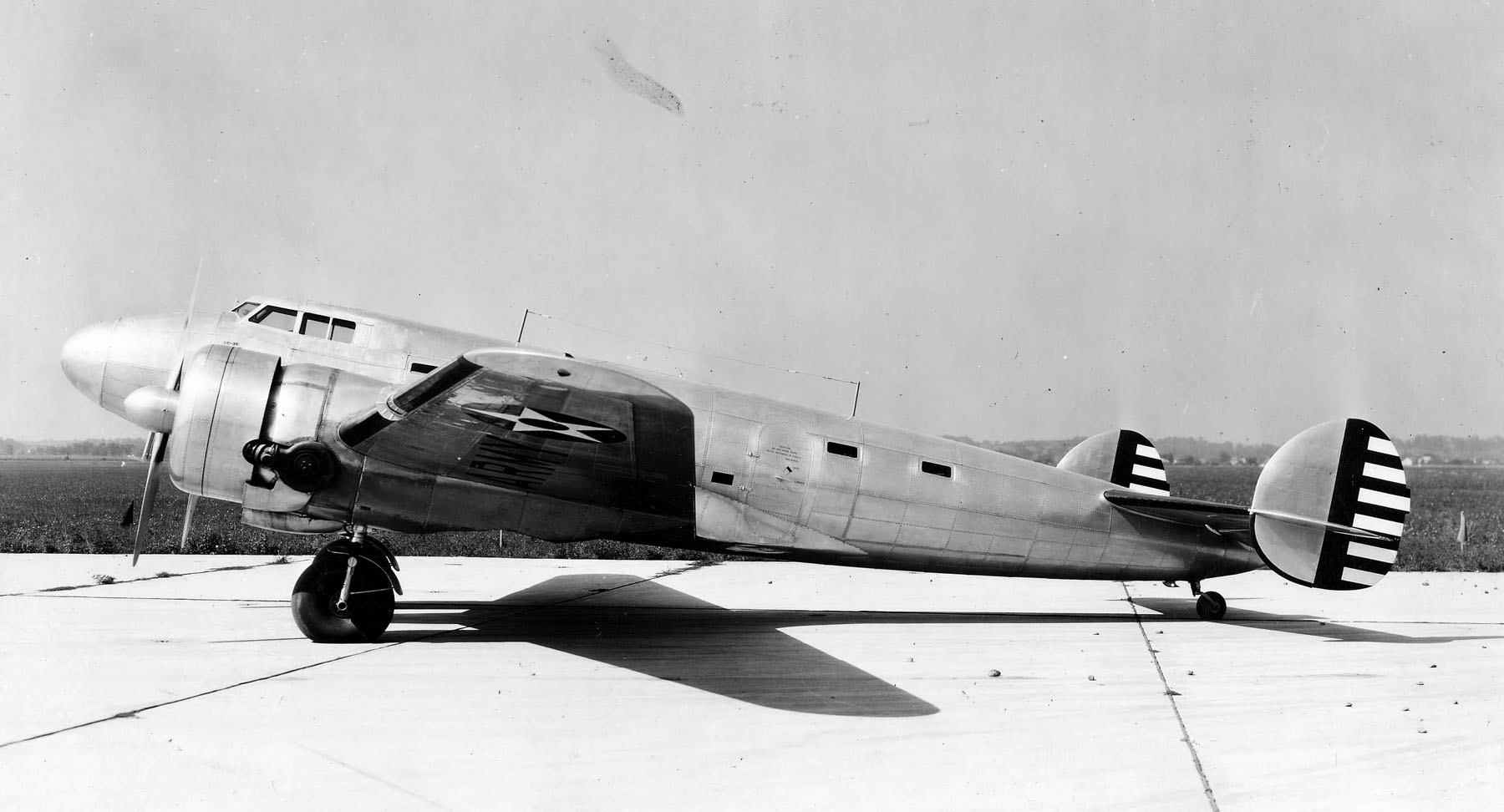
Lockheed XC-35

The Electra was produced in several variants, for both civilian and military customers. Lockheed built a total of 149 Electras.

Electra 10-A
Powered by two Pratt & Whitney R-985 Wasp Junior SB, 450 hp (336 kW) each; 101 produced.
- Three built for the U.S. Army Air Corps as Y1C-36, redesignated as C-36 in 1938 and as UC-36 in 1943.
- Fifteen impressed by the U.S. Army Air Forces as C-36A, redesignated as UC-36A in 1943.
- One built as XR2O-1 for the U.S. Secretary of the Navy.
- One built as Y1C-37 for the Chief of the National Guard Bureau, redesignated as C-37 in 1938 and as UC-37 in 1943.
Electra 10-B
Powered by Wright R-975-E3 Whirlwind, 440 hp (328 kW) each; 18 produced
- Seven impressed by the U.S. Army Air Forces as C-36C, redesignated as UC-36C in 1943.
- One built as XR3O-1 for the U.S. Coast Guard for use by the Secretary of the Treasury.
Electra 10-C
Powered by Pratt & Whitney R-1340 Wasp SC1, 450 hp (336 kW) each; eight produced for Pan American Airways.
Electra 10-D
Proposed military transport version; none built.
Electra 10-E
Powered by Pratt & Whitney R-1340 Wasp S3H1, 600 hp (447 kW) each; 15 produced. The version used by Amelia Earhart.
- Five impressed by the U.S. Army Air Forces as C-36B, redesignated as UC-36B in 1943.
XC-35

Experimental pressurized research model powered by turbocharged Pratt & Whitney XR-1340-43, 550 hp (410 kW) each. The one production model was tested for the War Department by Lieutenant Benjamin S. Kelsey. For this work, the Army Air Corps was awarded the 1937 Collier Trophy.
Lockheed KXL1
A single Lockheed Model 10 Electra supplied to the Imperial Japanese Navy Air Service for evaluation.

== Operators ==
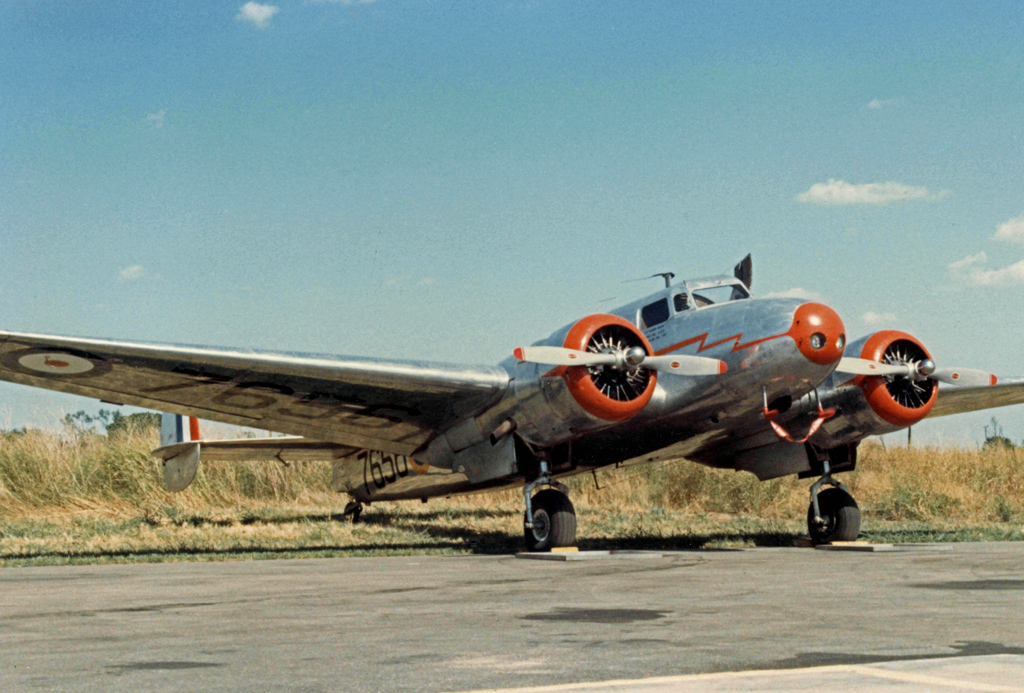
Lockheed 10A restored in wartime RCAF markings

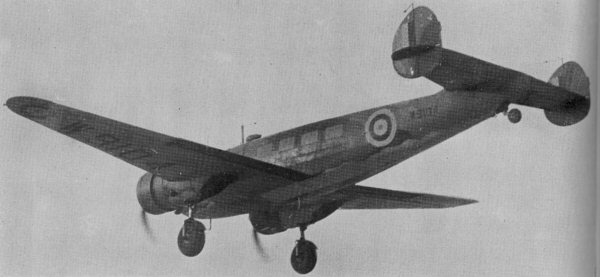
Lockheed Electra 10A in Royal Air Force service

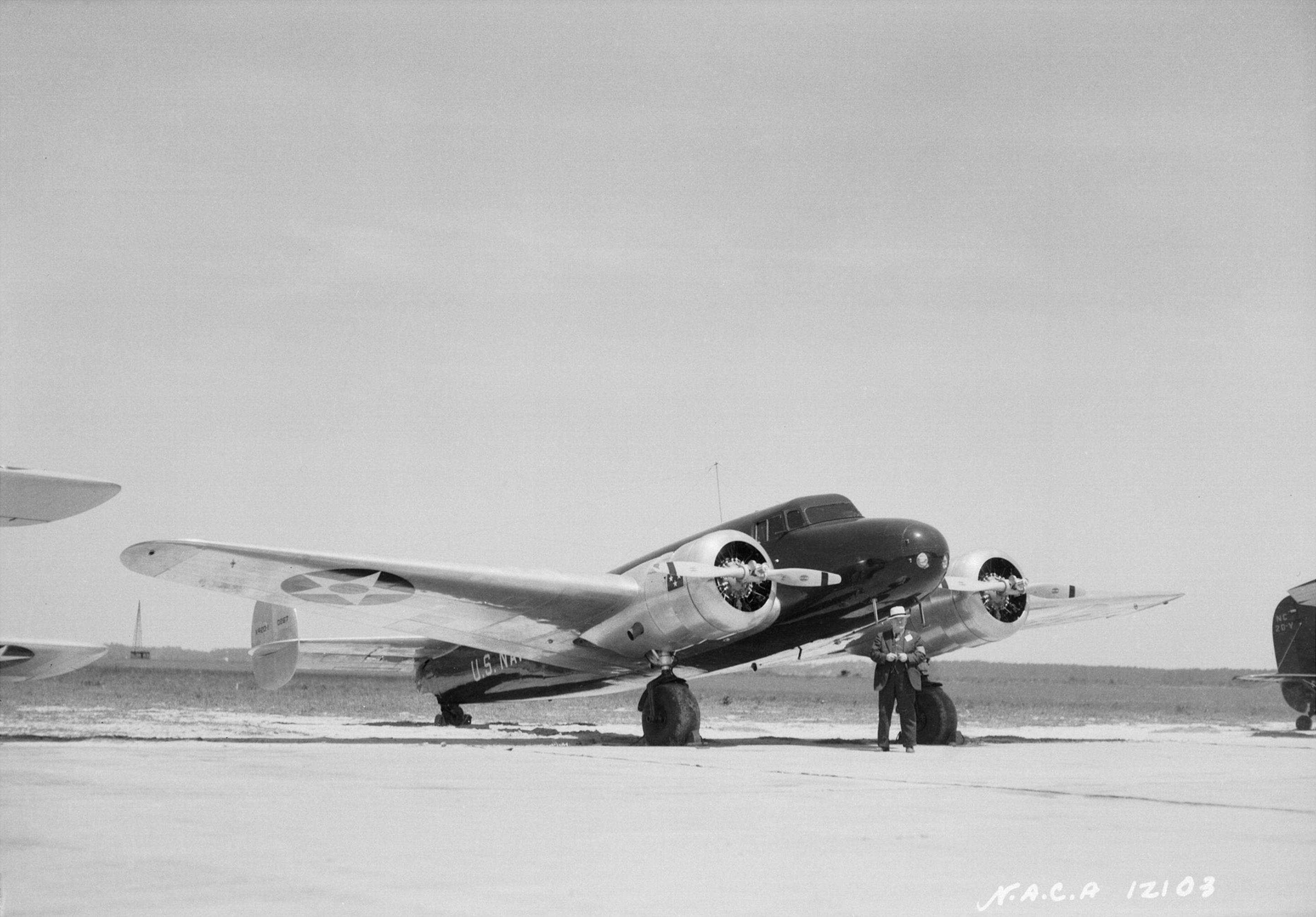
U.S. Navy XR2O-1

=== Civil operators ===
Australia

- Ansett Airways
- Guinea Airways, an Australian airline serving New Guinea.
- MacRobertson-Miller Aviation
- Marshall Airways
- Qantas Empire Airways

Brazil

- Aeronorte
- Cruzeiro do Sul
- Panair do Brasil
- VARIG

Canada

- Canadian Airways
- Trans-Canada Air Lines

Chile

- LAN Chile

Cuba

- Compañia Cubana de Aviación

Czechoslovakia

- Baťa Shoes Corporation

Mexico

- Compañía Mexicana de Aviación

Netherlands

- KLM West Indies Section

New Zealand

- Union Airways of New Zealand
- National Airways Corporation
- Trans-Island Airways

Panama

- TASA-Turismo Aereo S.A. operated one aircraft between Panama City (Paitilla) and Chitre circa 1957–1963.

Poland

- LOT Polish Airlines operated ten aircraft between 1936 and 1939.

Romania

- LARES

United Kingdom

- British Airways Ltd. (not to be confused with the present-day British Airways)

United States

- Braniff Airways
- Chicago and Southern Air Lines
- Continental Air Lines
- Delta Air Lines
- Eastern Air Lines
- Mid-Continent Airlines (formerly Hanford Airlines)
- Midwest Airways
- National Airlines
- Northeast Airlines (formerly Boston-Maine/Central Vermont Airways)
- Northwest Airlines
- Pacific Alaska Airways, which became the Alaska division of Pan American Airways
- Provincetown-Boston Airlines
- Wisconsin Central Airlines

Venezuela

- Aerotecnica S.A. ATSA
- Línea Aeropostal Venezolana

Yugoslavia

- Aeroput

=== Military operators ===
Argentina

- Argentine Air Force

Brazil

- Brazilian Air Force

Canada

- Royal Canadian Air Force

Honduras

- Honduran Air Force

Nicaragua

- Nicaragua Air Force pre 1979

Spain

- Spanish Republican Air Force

Japan

- Imperial Japanese Navy Air Service

United Kingdom

- Royal Air Force

United States

- United States Army Air Corps/Army Air Forces
- United States Navy
- United States Coast Guard

Venezuela

- Venezuelan Air Force

== Surviving aircraft ==
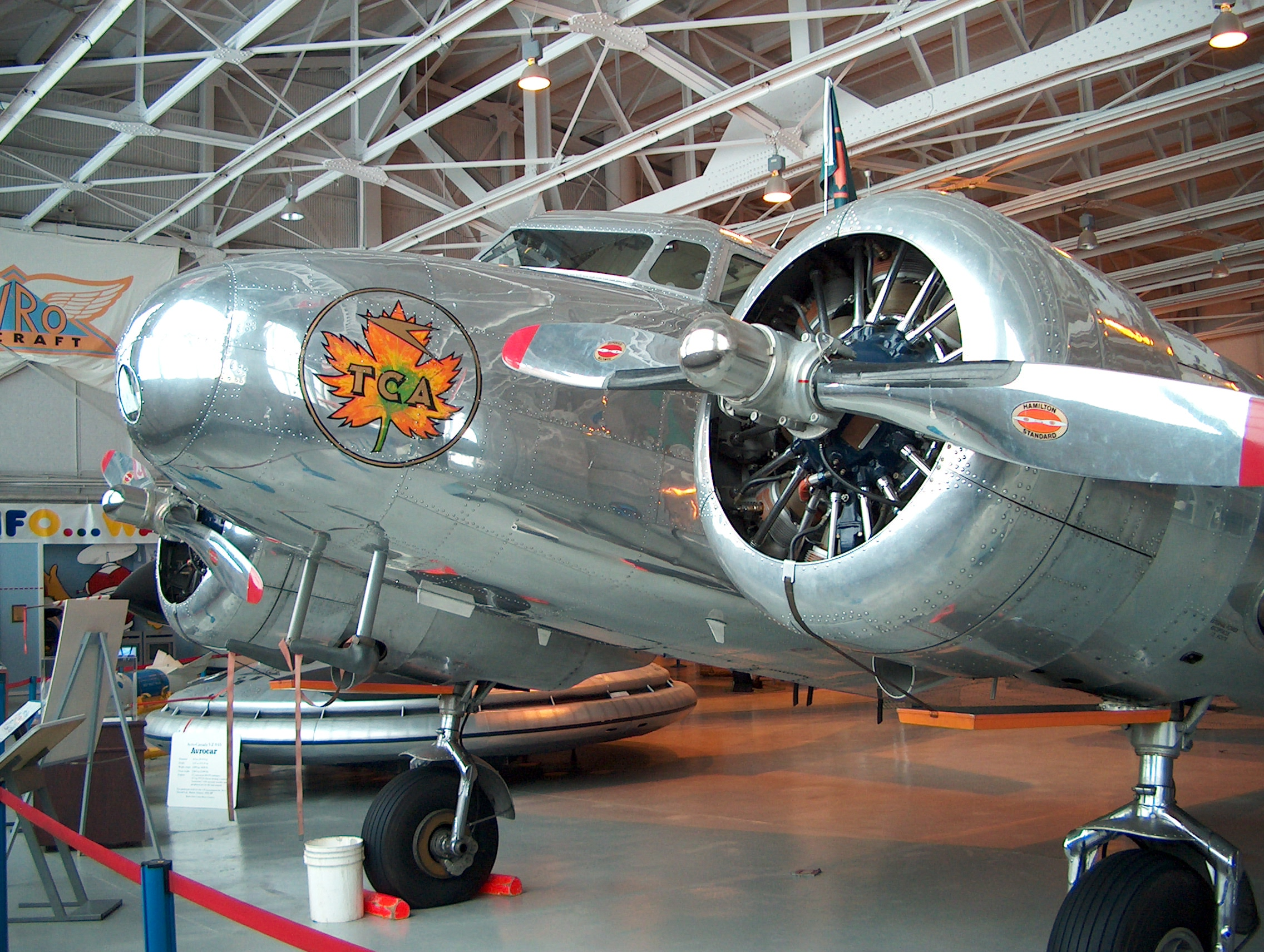
Electra 10A "CF-TCC" in Trans-Canada Air Lines livery at the Western Canada Aviation Museum

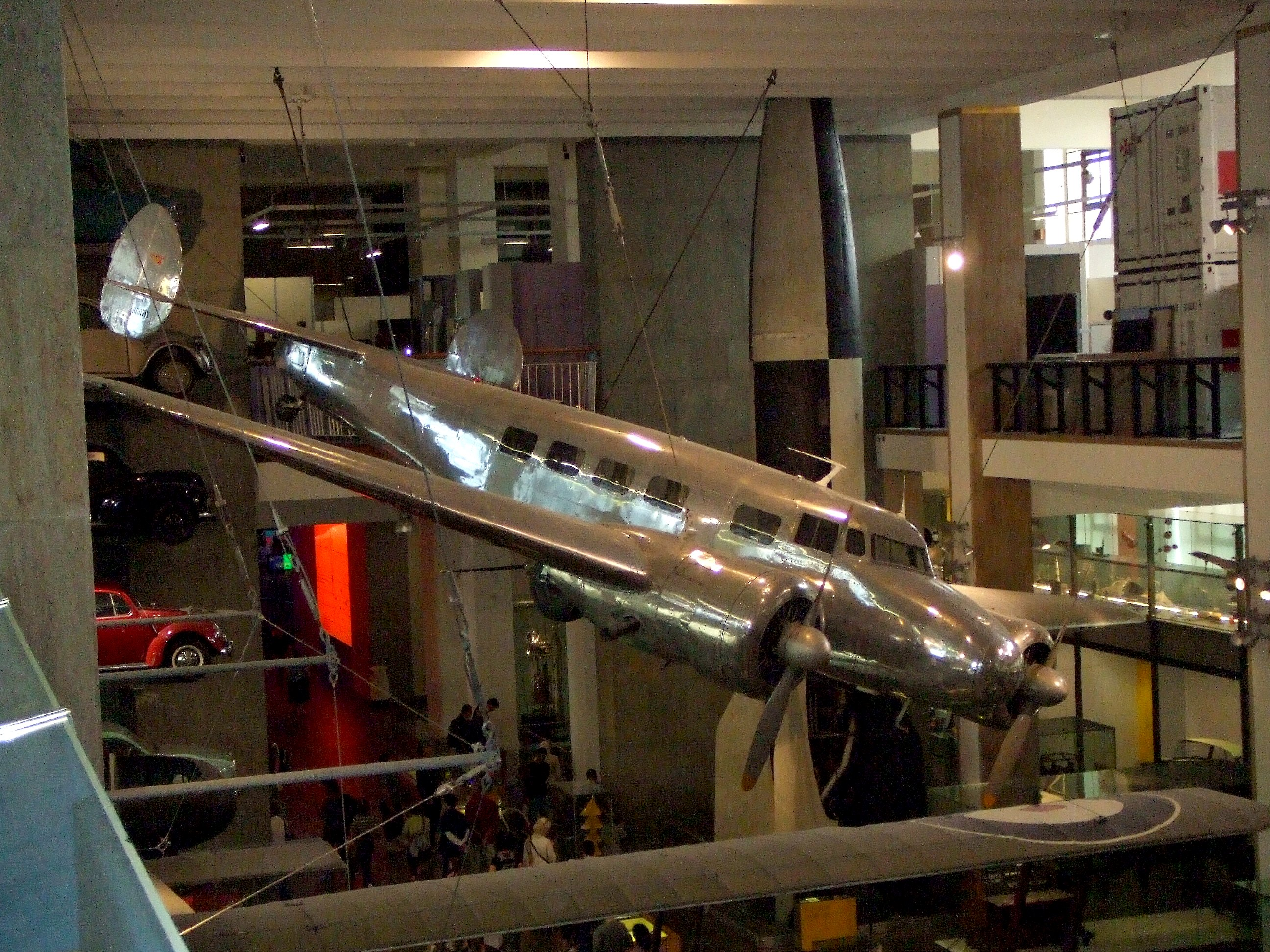
Lockheed Electra at the Science Museum (London)

- 1011 – Electra 10A on static display at the Pima Air and Space Museum in Tucson, Arizona.
- 1015 – Electra 10E on static display at the Museum of Flight in Seattle, Washington.
- 1026 – Electra 10A on display at the Oakland Aviation Museum in Oakland, California.
- 1037 – Electra 10A on static display at the Science Museum in London.
- 1042 Muriel – Electra 10E on static display at the Amelia Earhart Hangar Museum at Amelia Earhart Airport in Atchison, Kansas. Delivered to Atchison in August 2016, it was previously owned by Grace McGuire, who had planned on using it to recreate Amelia Earhart's around-the-world flight.
- 1052 – Electra 10A on static display at the New England Air Museum in Windsor Locks, Connecticut. Originally an XR2O-1 used for transporting high ranking staff by the U.S. Navy, it is now painted in Northwest Airlines colors. At one point it was intended to use this machine for a recreation of the Earhart flight but it was not carried out.
- 1091 – Electra 10A airworthy with Ivo Lukačovič at Točná Airport in Točná, Prague. Registered previously as OK-CTB (now N241M), it was one of two owned by Bata Shoe Co. in Prague, Czechoslovakia before WWII. At the outbreak of WWII it was evacuated to England, and onward to Canada where it served with the RCAF. After a succession of US owners, it was eventually reacquired by Bata Shoe, and fully restored by Wichita Air Services in Newton, Kansas. Wearing its original colors and registration marks, it was flown back to Prague in May 2015.
- 1112 – Electra 10A on static display at the Canada Aviation and Space Museum in Ottawa, Ontario. Originally purchased by Trans-Canada Air Lines as their first new aircraft, it was transferred to the RCAF in 1939, with whom it served for most of World War II. After the war it was operated by a number of private owners. It survived into the 1960s when Ann Pellegreno between June 7 and July 10, 1967, flew the aircraft on a round-the-world flight to commemorate Amelia Earhart's last flight in 1937. After being acquired by Air Canada, it was restored in 1968 and donated to the museum.
- 1116 – Electra 10A airworthy at the Royal Aviation Museum of Western Canada in Winnipeg, Manitoba. It was one of a second batch of three Electras delivered to Trans-Canada Airlines. Found in Florida in the early 1980s by a vacationing Air Canada employee, it was returned to Winnipeg for restoration. In 1987 it flew across Canada in honor of the 50th anniversary of Air Canada – who owns and operates the aircraft.
- 1130 – Electra 10A on static display at the National Naval Aviation Museum in Pensacola, Florida.
- 1138 – Electra 10A on static display at the Museum of Transport and Technology in Auckland.
- 1145 - Electra 10A airworthy with Rob Mackley at Omaka, Blenheim, New Zealand registered as ZK-AFD. Aircraft ex LAN Chile, previously registered CC226 'Diego de Almagro', CC-LGN-507, CC-CLG-0005, CC-CLEA-231 and N10310.
- 3105 – XC-35 in storage at the Paul E. Garber Preservation, Restoration, and Storage Facility of the National Air and Space Museum in Suitland, Maryland. It was used for testing pressurization.

== Specifications (Electra 10A) ==
3-view drawing of the Lockheed Model 10 Electra

Data from Jane's All the World's Aircraft 1937.

General characteristics

- Crew: 2
- Capacity: 10 passengers + 670 lb (304 kg) mail and baggage
- Length: 38 ft 7 in (11.76 m)
- Wingspan: 55 ft (17 m)
- Height: 10 ft 1 in (3.07 m)
- Wing area: 458.3 sq ft (42.58 m^{2})
- Airfoil: root: Clark Y (18%); tip: Clark Y (9%)
- Empty weight: 6,325 lb (2,869 kg) equipped
- Gross weight: 10,100 lb (4,581 kg)
- Fuel capacity: 194 US gal (161.5 imp gal; 734.4 L) in centre-section leading edges and fuselage
- Powerplant: 2 × Pratt & Whitney R-985 Wasp Junior SB 9-cylinder air-cooled radial piston engines, 450 hp (340 kW) each at 2,300 rpm at 5,000 ft (1,500 m)
- Propellers: 2-bladed Hamilton Standard constant-speed propellers

Performance

- Maximum speed: 190 mph (310 km/h, 170 kn) at sea level, fully loaded

210 mph (182 kn; 338 km/h) at 5,000 ft (1,500 m)

- Cruise speed: 176 mph (283 km/h, 153 kn) at sea level

185 mph (161 kn; 298 km/h) at 5,000 ft (1,500 m)
195 mph (169 kn; 314 km/h) at 9,600 ft (2,900 m)

- Landing speed: 64 mph (56 kn; 103 km/h) flaps down
- Range: 810 mi (1,300 km, 700 nmi) at 75% power with maximum fuel
- Service ceiling: 21,250 ft (6,480 m) * Absolute ceiling: 23,200 ft (7,100 m)
- Absolute ceiling on one engine: 5,800 ft (1,800 m) fully loaded
- Rate of climb: 1,000 ft/min (5.1 m/s)
- Wing loading: 22.04 lb/sq ft (107.6 kg/m^{2})
- Power/mass: 0.079 hp/lb (0.130 kW/kg)

== See also ==
- Lockheed L-188 Electra, an unrelated postwar turboprop Lockheed airliner later sharing the same name

Related development

- Lockheed Model 12 Electra Junior
- Lockheed Model 14 Super Electra
- Lockheed Model 18 Lodestar

Aircraft of comparable role, configuration, and era

- Avro Anson
- Airspeed Oxford
- Barkley-Grow T8P-1
- Beechcraft Model 18
- Boeing 247
- Douglas DC-2
- Caudron C.440 Goéland
- SAI KZ IV

Related lists

- List of aircraft of World War II
- List of aircraft of the Spanish Republican Air Force
- List of military aircraft of the United States
- List of United States Navy aircraft designations (pre-1962)
- List of Lockheed aircraft
