= Lockheed Model 12 Electra Junior =

Twin engine utility aircraft

Model 12 Electra Junior
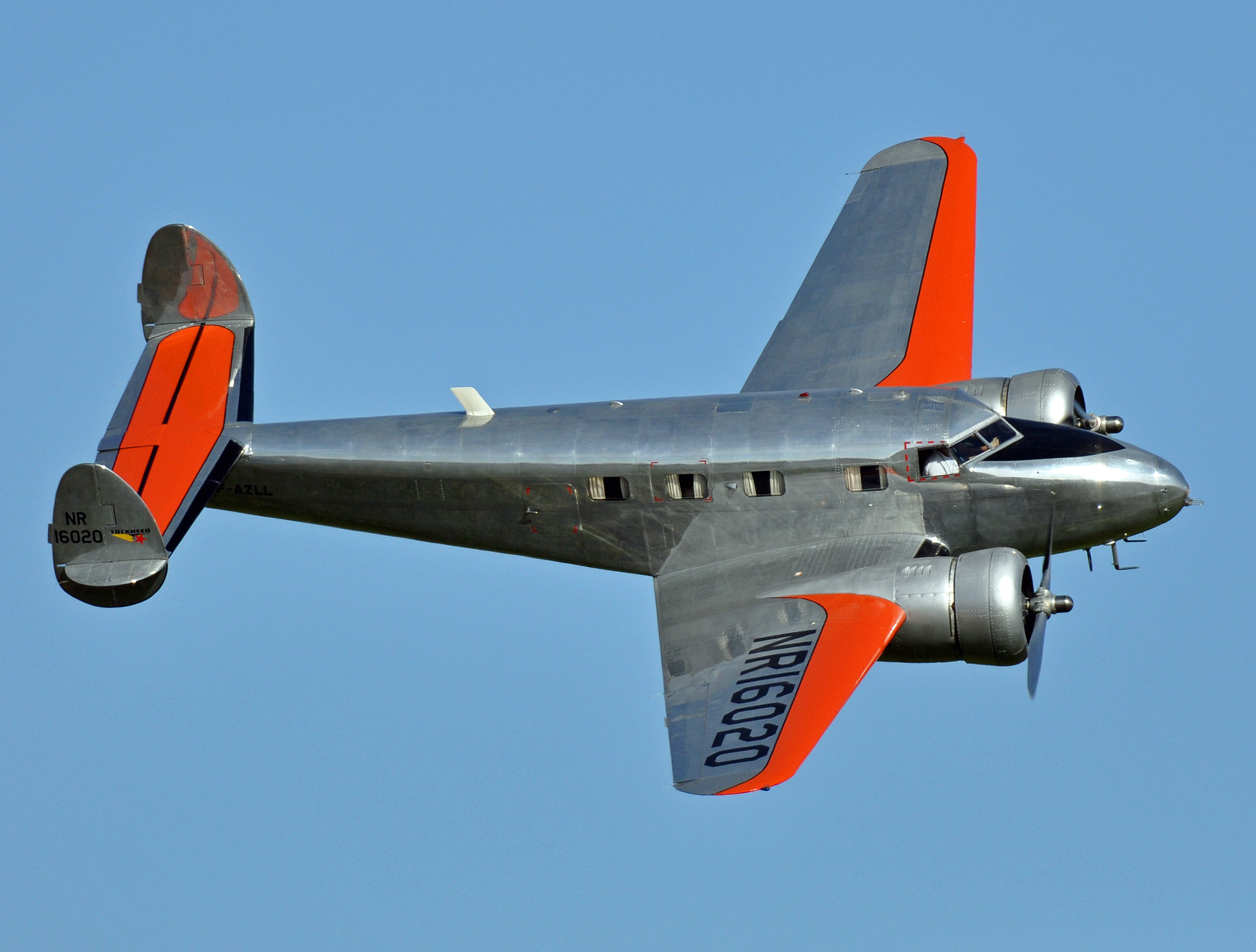

General information
- Type: Civil and military utility aircraft
- National origin: United States
- Manufacturer: Lockheed Corporation
- Number built: 130

History
- First flight: June 27, 1936
- Developed from: Lockheed Model 10 Electra

The Lockheed Model 12 Electra Junior, more commonly known as the Lockheed 12 or L-12, is an eight-seat, six-passenger all-metal twin-engine transport aircraft of the late 1930s designed for use by small airlines, companies, and wealthy private individuals. A smaller version of the Lockheed Model 10 Electra, the Lockheed 12 was not popular as an airliner but was widely used as a corporate and government transport. Several were also used for testing new aviation technologies.

== Design and development ==
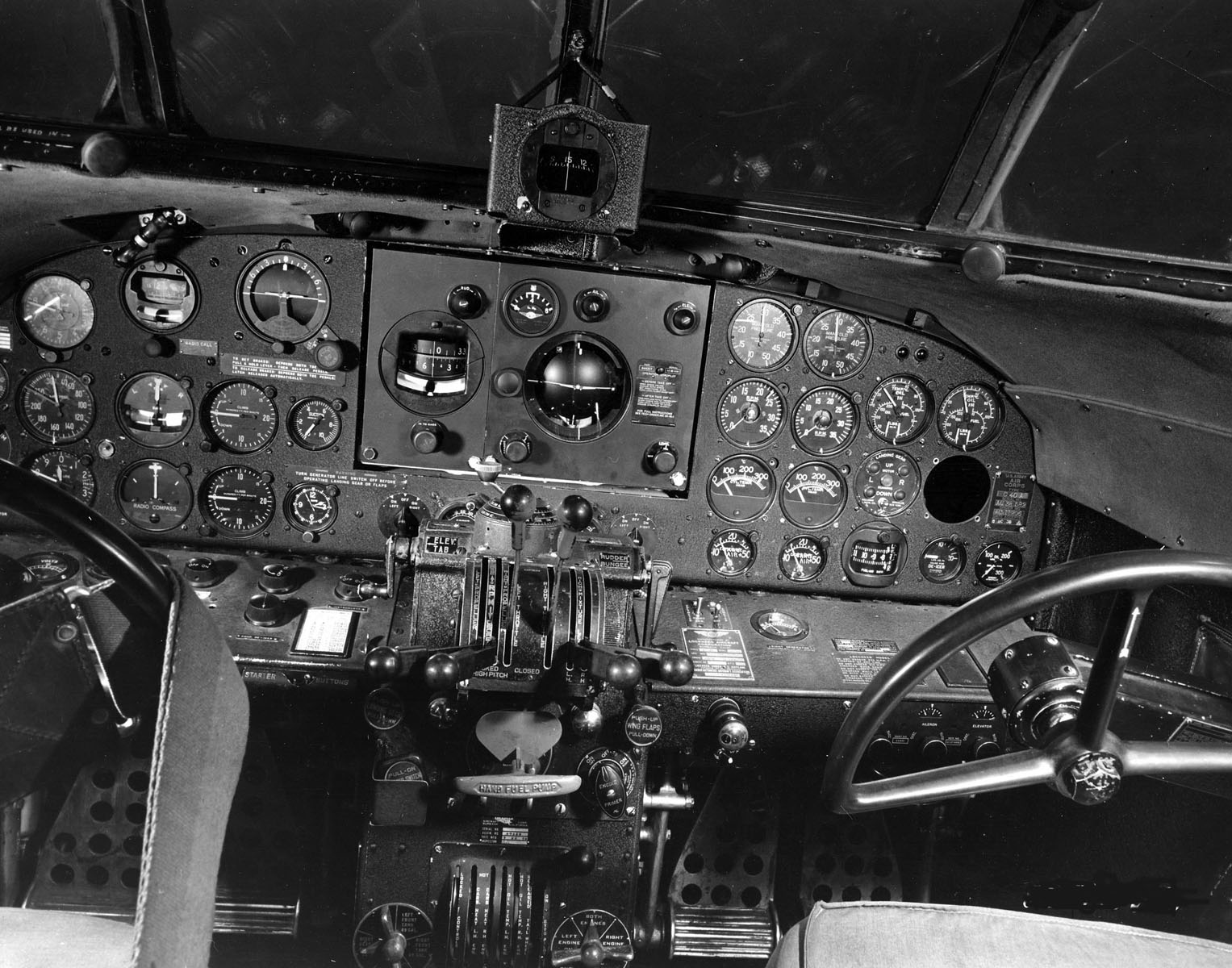
Cockpit of a C-40A, a U.S. Army version of the Lockheed 12

After Lockheed had introduced its 10-passenger Model 10 Electra, the company decided to develop a smaller version which would be better suited as a "feeder airliner" or a corporate executive transport. At the same time, the U.S. Bureau of Air Commerce had also sensed the need for a small feeder airliner and announced a design competition for one. In order for a candidate to qualify for the competition, a prototype had to fly by June 30, 1936.

Lockheed based its candidate, which it named the Model 12 Electra Junior, around a scaled down Electra. It would carry only six passengers and two pilots but would use the same 450 hp (340 kW) Pratt & Whitney R-985 Wasp Junior SB radial engines as the main Electra version, the 10A. This made it faster than the Electra, with a top speed of 225 mph (362 km/h) at 5,000 ft (1,500 m). Like the Electra, the Model 12 had an all-metal structure, trailing-edge wing flaps, low-drag NACA engine cowlings, and two-bladed controllable-pitch propellers (later changed to constant-speed propellers). It also had the Electra's twin tail fins and rudders, which were becoming a Lockheed trademark. The landing gear was a conventional tail-dragger arrangement, with the main wheels retracting backwards into the engine nacelles; as was often the case with retractable gear of the period, the wheel bottoms were left exposed in case a wheels-up emergency landing was necessary, or the pilot simply forgot to deploy his novel landing gear.

As in the Electra and the Boeing 247, the Model 12's main wing spar passed through the passenger cabin; small steps were placed on either side of the spar to ease passenger movement. The cabin had a lavatory in the rear. Although the standard cabin layout was for six passengers, Lockheed also offered roomier, more luxurious layouts for corporate or private owners.

The new transport had its first flight on June 27, 1936, three days before the competition deadline, at 12:12 PM local time, a time deliberately chosen for the Model 12's number. As it turned out, the other two competition entries, the Beechcraft Model 18 and the Barkley-Grow T8P-1, weren't ready in time for the deadline, so Lockheed won by default. The "Electra Junior" name did not catch on in the way that the original Electra's name had. Most users simply referred to the aircraft by its model number, as the Lockheed 12.

The original Lockheed 12 version, with Wasp Junior engines, was the Model 12A. Almost every Lockheed 12 built was a 12A or derived from the 12A. There was also a Model 12B, using 440 hp (330 kW) Wright R-975-E3 Whirlwind radials, but only two of this model were built. Although Lockheed had also announced a Model 12F, powered by Wright R-760 Whirlwind seven-cylinder radials, and a Model 12M, powered by 290 hp (220 kW) Menasco six-cylinder inline engines, neither of these versions reached production.

== Operational history ==
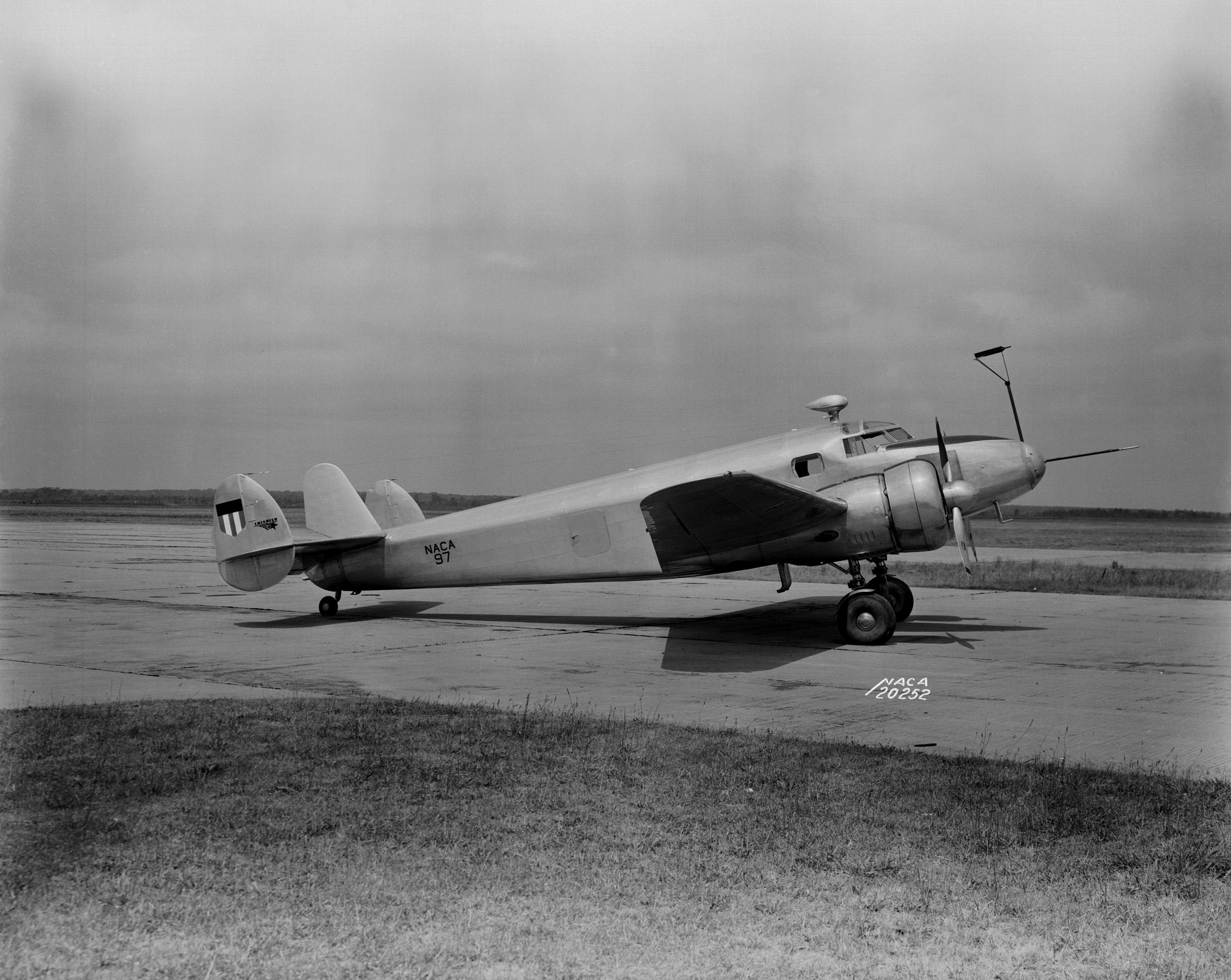
NACA's Lockheed 12A used for deicing testing

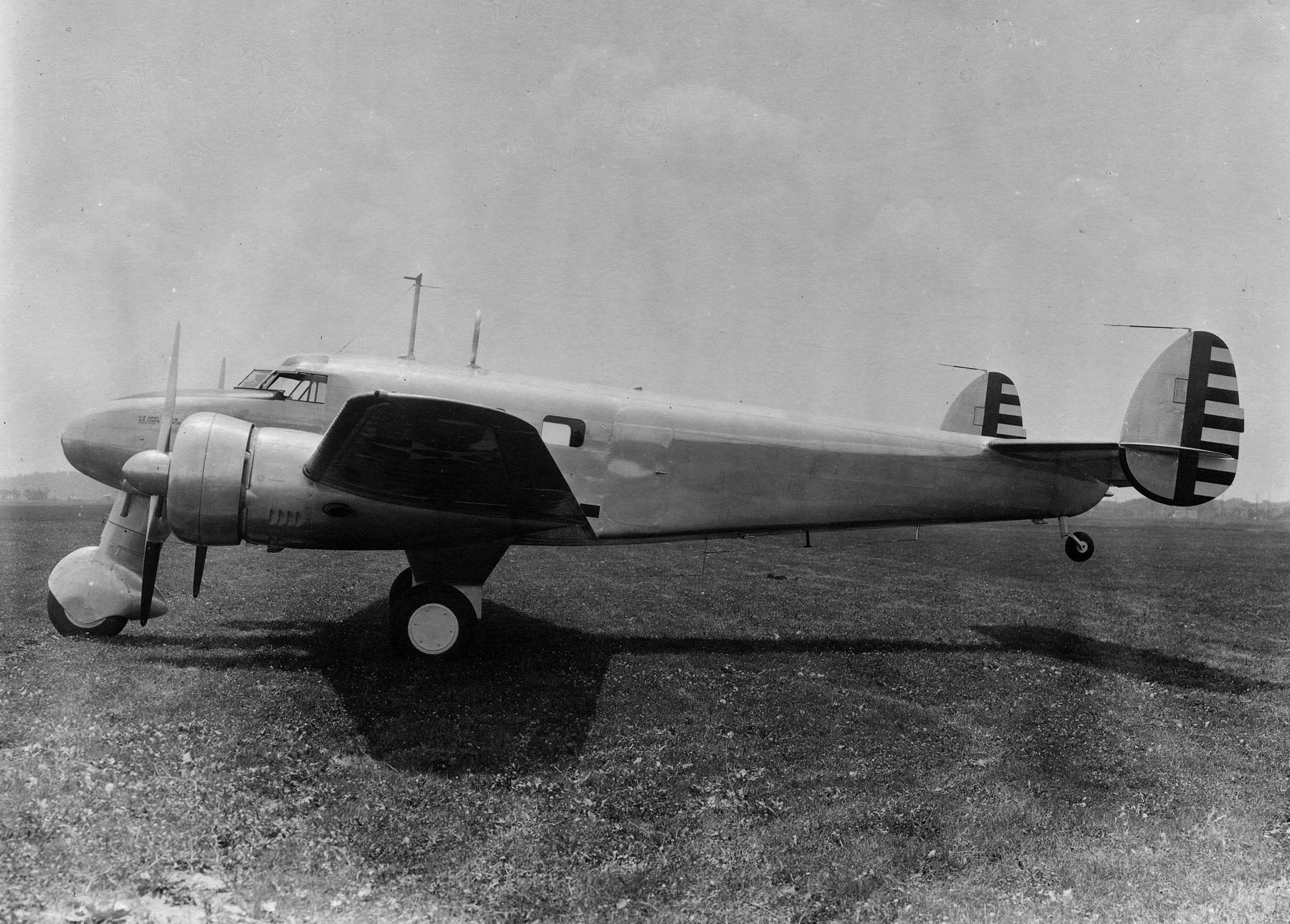
U.S. Army Air Corps C-40B with fixed tricycle landing gear

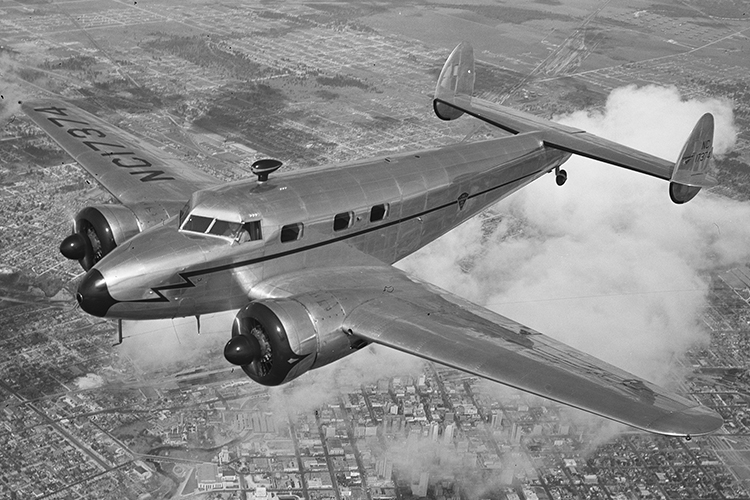
Electra Junior in flight

Even though the Lockheed 12 had won the government's feeder airliner competition, most of the airlines rejected it, and very few Lockheed 12s were used as airliners. One notable airline user was the newly renamed Continental Air Lines, which had a fleet of three Lockheed 12s that ran on its route between Denver, Colorado, and El Paso, Texas, in the late 1930s. Another was British West Indian Airways Ltd., which flew the Lockheed 12 on Caribbean routes in the Lesser Antilles during the mid-1940s.

The Lockheed 12 proved much more popular as a transport for company executives or government officials. Oil and steel companies were among the major users. A number were purchased as military staff transports by the United States Army Air Corps, which designated the type as the C-40, and by the United States Navy, which used the designation JO, or in one peculiar case, R3O-2. With the arrival of World War II, many civilian Lockheed 12s were requisitioned by the U.S. Army and Navy, Britain's Royal Air Force, and the Royal Canadian Air Force.

Two civil Lockheed 12s ordered by British Airways Ltd. were actually intended for covert military reconnaissance flights. Sidney Cotton modified these aircraft for aerial photography and in civilian guise, overflew and surreptitiously photographed many German and Italian military installations during the months preceding World War II. One of these G-AFTL has recently been returned to flight in the UK with its most recent display being at IWM Duxford Flying Days: VE Day on the 9th May 2026.

The main military user of the Lockheed 12 was the Royal Netherlands East Indies Army Air Force, which bought 36. Sixteen of these were the Model 212, a version created by Lockheed for training bomber crews, which had a .303 in (7.696 mm) caliber machine gun in an unpowered, partly retractable gun turret on top of the fuselage, a second .303-caliber machine gun fixed in the nose, and bomb racks under the wing center section that could hold eight 100 lb (45 kg) bombs. The other 20 aircraft were transport versions.

Several Lockheed 12s were used as technology testbeds. The U.S. National Advisory Committee for Aeronautics (NACA) bought two, adding a center vertical fin to each of them to test stability improvements. One of the NACA Lockheed 12s was used to test "hot-wing" deicing technology, in which hot exhaust air from the engines was ducted through the wing's leading edge to prevent ice accumulation.

Three other Lockheed 12s were used to test tricycle landing gear. These had their normal landing gear replaced by a non-retracting version with a large nosewheel and with the main wheels shifted further back on the engine nacelles. (The tailwheel from the normal conventional gear was retained.) The gear was non-retractable because there wasn't room within the structure to stow it in retracted position. Streamlined fairings were placed on the gear to reduce drag. One of the tricycle gear Lockheed 12s went to the U.S. Navy as the XJO-3 and performed carrier landing tests on the USS Lexington to study the suitability of a twin-engined tricycle-gear aircraft for carrier operations. Another went to the U.S. Army as the C-40B, and still another was retained by Lockheed for its own testing; both of these were eventually converted back to the normal landing gear configuration.

Milo Burcham flew a Lockheed 12A in the 1937 Bendix Trophy Race from Burbank, California to Cleveland, Ohio. This 12A had extra fuel tanks in the cabin, allowing it to save time by making the entire 2,043 mi (3,288 km) trip non-stop. The 12A came in fifth at an average speed of 184 mph (296 km/h); this was an impressive performance, since the first and fourth-place winners were both privately owned Seversky P-35 fighters.

Another Lockheed 12A, owned by Republic Oil Company and named The Texan, was modified by aviator Jimmie Mattern for a round-the-world flight attempt. Mattern filled the 12A's cabin with fuel tanks and removed the cabin windows and door; the crew would enter the aircraft via a cockpit hatch. The aircraft was denied a U.S. permit for the flight following the Earhart incident, but was then pressed into action in September 1937 in a long range search effort for Sigizmund Levanevsky, who crashed somewhere between the North pole and Barrow, Alaska. "The Texan" was outfitted as a luxury transport afterward, and lost in a hangar fire in January 1938.

Lockheed built a total of 130 Lockheed 12s, ending production in 1941. With the arrival of World War II, Lockheed concentrated its production efforts on more advanced military aircraft, such as the Hudson bomber and the P-38 Lightning twin-engined fighter. The Lockheed 12's market was left to the Beechcraft Model 18, thousands of which would eventually be produced.

A number of Lockheed 12s have survived to the present day, mostly in private hands. Several of these are still flying.

== Variants ==
=== Civil models ===
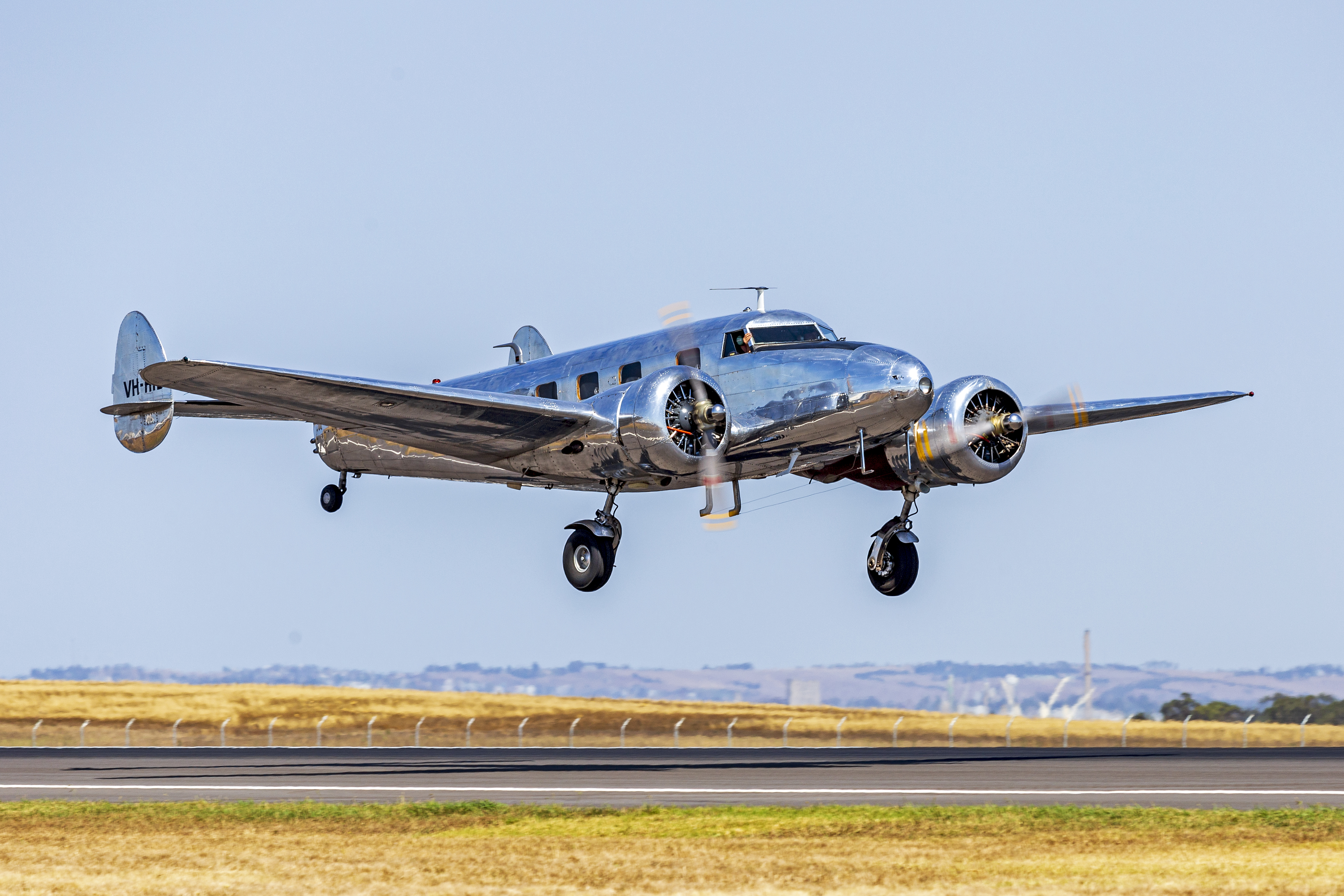
1937 Lockheed 12A

Model 12A
Powered by two 450 hp (336 kW) Pratt & Whitney R-985 Wasp Junior SB radial engines. 70 built.
Model 12B
Like 12A, but powered by two 440 hp (328 kW) Wright R-975-E3 Whirlwind radial engines. This was a normal civil model, but the only two built (serial numbers 1228 and 1249) went to the Argentine Army.
Model 12-25
Last two civilian Model 12's produced (serial numbers 1293 and 1294), same as 12A but with Pratt & Whitney R-985 Wasp Junior SB3 engines.

=== Military models ===
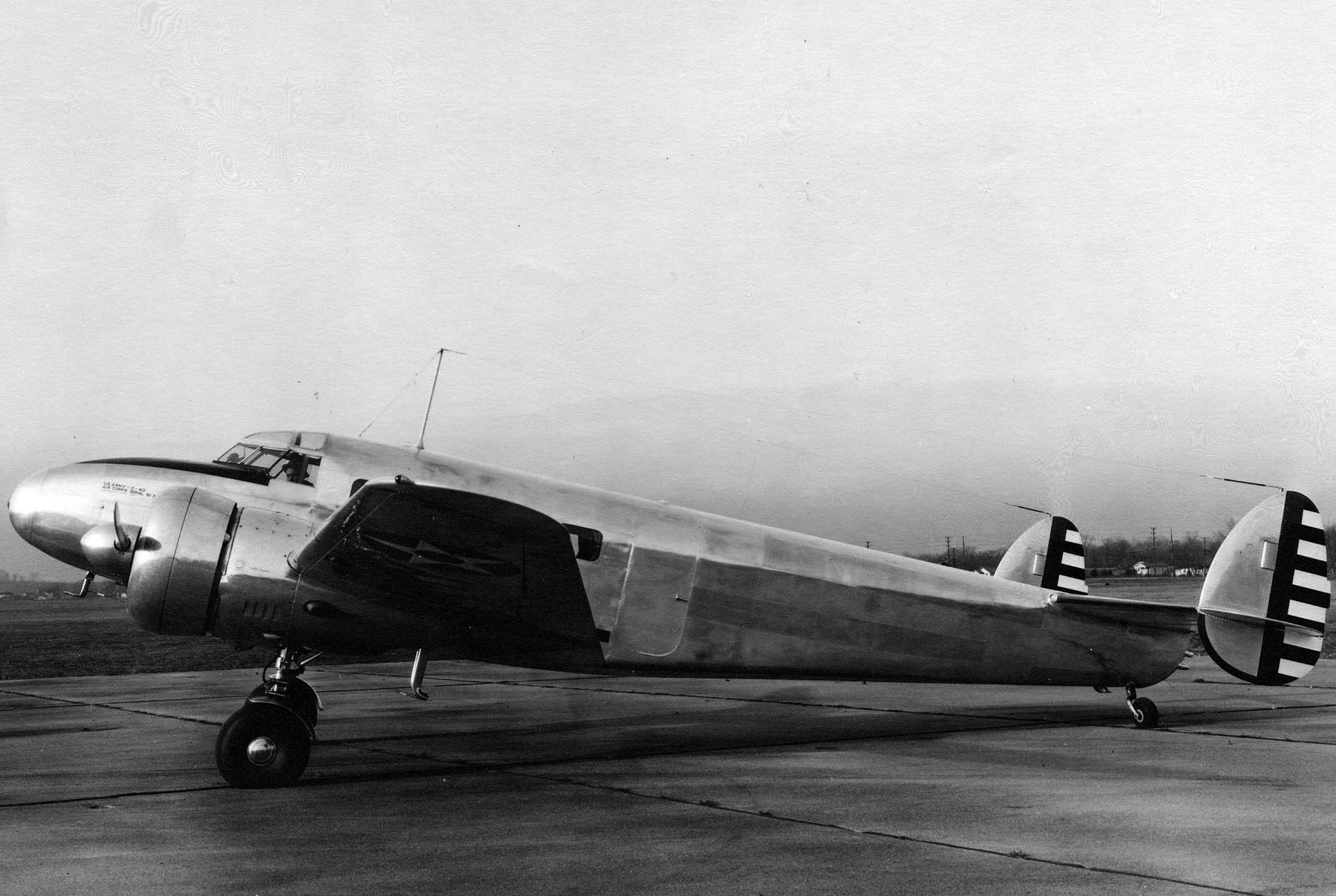
U.S. Army Air Corps C-40

All of these were based on the Model 12A and used the same engines.

C-40
U.S. Army Air Corps five-passenger transport; prototype (serial 1247) converted from company owned 12A, two others built, redesignated UC-40 in January 1943.
C-40A
U.S. Army Air Corps transport with mixed passenger/cargo interior; 10 built, plus one converted from C-40B, redesignated UC-40A in January 1943.
C-40B
U.S. Army Air Corps testbed for testing fixed tricycle landing gear; one built, converted to a normal C-40A in 1940.
C-40D
Eleven civil Model 12As impressed by the U.S. Army Air Forces in 1942, with standard six-passenger interior. Redesignated UC-40D in January 1943.
JO-1
U.S. Navy five-passenger transport; one built.
JO-2
U.S. Navy and Marine Corps six-passenger transport; five built.
XJO-3
U.S. Navy testbed with fixed tricycle gear, used for carrier landing tests and airborne radar trials; one built.
R3O-2
One civil Model 12A impressed by the U.S. Navy in 1941. (This was an anomalous designation, since the Navy had already used R3O for the Model 10 Electra.)
Model 212
Bomber trainer with bomb racks and gun turret atop aft fuselage; prototype (serial 1243, reserialed 212-13) converted from company owned 12A, 16 others built, one prototype and 16 for the Royal Netherlands East Indies Army Air Force.
Model 12-26
Military transport version of the Model 212; 20 built for the Royal Netherlands East Indies Army Air Force.

== Operators ==
=== Civilian ===
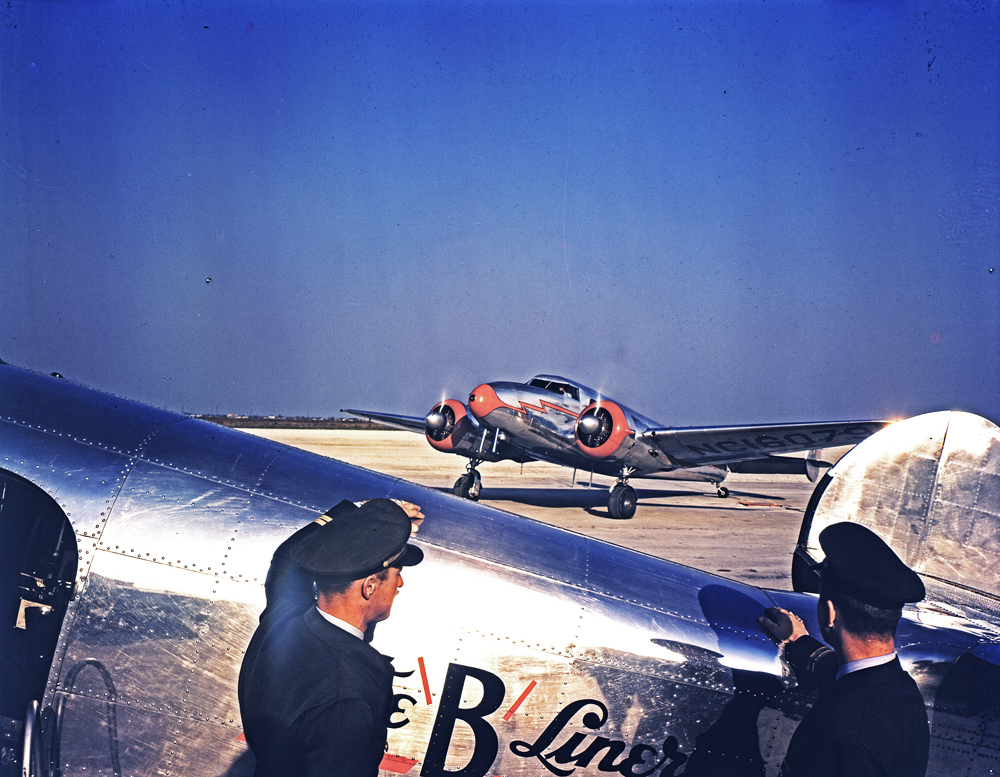
Lockheed 12A Electra Junior taxiing at Houston Hobby Airport, 1940. This aircraft belonged to the Continental Oil Company. In the foreground is a Braniff Lockheed Model 10 Electra.

- Aeronorte
- Aerovias Brasil
- Associated Airlines (Australia)
- British West Indian Airways Ltd.
- Aeronautical Research and Sales Corporation of London (a front for the espionage of Sidney Cotton) One of its aircraft G-AFTL was returned to flight in the UK in 2023
- Continental Air Lines (formerly Varney Air Transport)
- Mercer Airlines (Burbank, CA)
- Cruzeiro do Sul
- National Advisory Committee for Aeronautics (NACA)
- Panair do Brasil
- Canadian Department of Transport
- Brazilian Ministry of Aeronautics
- Santa Maria Airlines

=== Military ===
Argentina

- Argentine Army

Brazil

- Brazilian Air Force

Canada

- Royal Canadian Air Force

Cuba
Indonesia

- Indonesian Air Force

Netherlands

- Royal Netherlands Air Force

Dutch East Indies

- Royal Netherlands East Indies Army Air Force

South Africa

- South African Air Force

United Kingdom

- Royal Air Force

United States

- United States Army Air Corps/United States Army Air Forces
- United States Marine Corps
- United States Navy

== Surviving aircraft ==
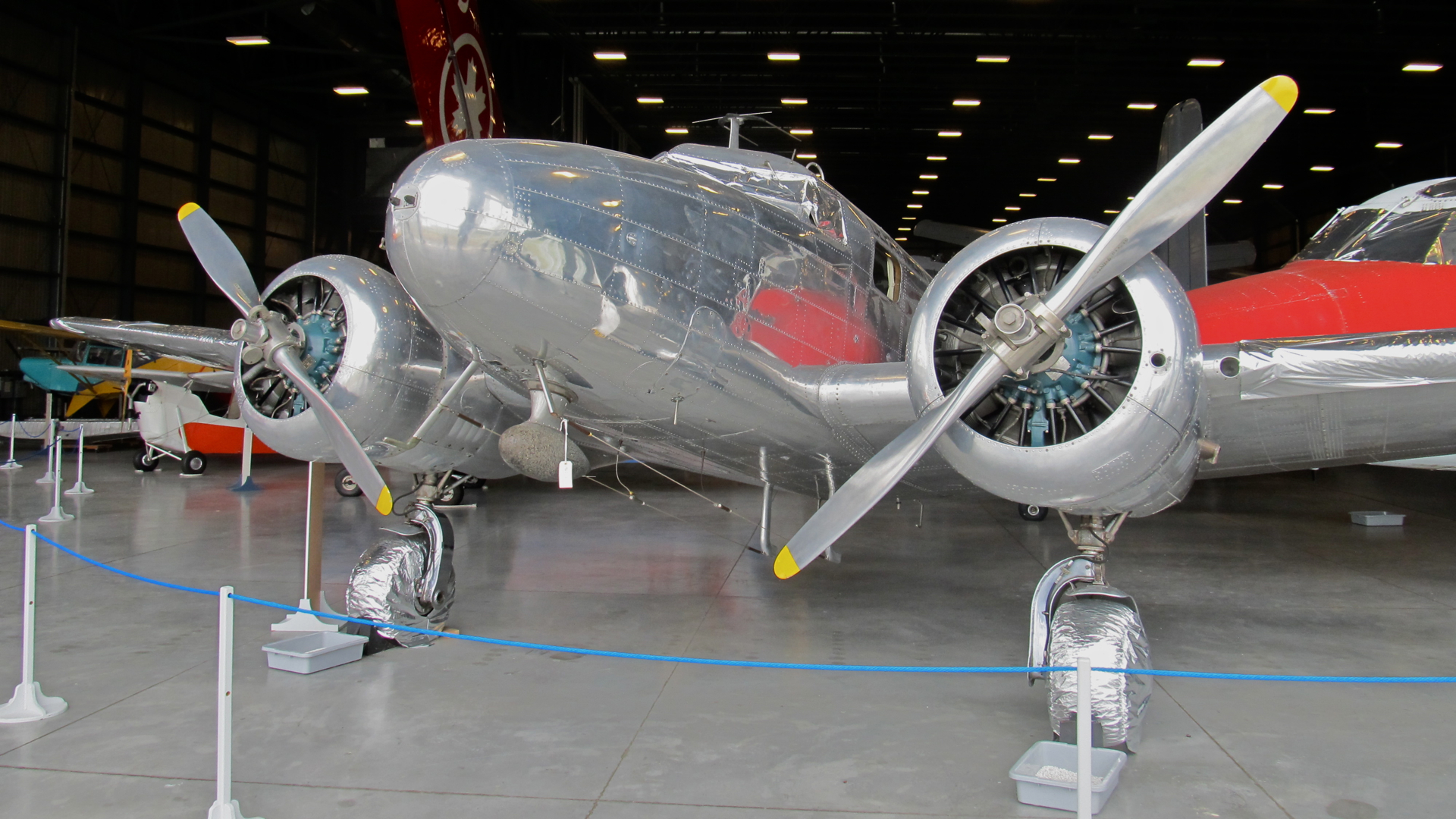
Model 12A at Canada Aviation and Space Museum

- A Model 12A (Canadian registration CF-CCT, Lockheed construction number 1219) is on display at the Canada Aviation Museum in Ottawa, Ontario. This aircraft was operated by Canada's Department of Transport from 1937 until 1963 and surveyed the route of the Trans-Canada Airway. In 1937 it made the first same-day flight from Montreal, Quebec to Vancouver, British Columbia, making five stops en route.
- A Royal Netherlands Air Force Lockheed 12A c/n 1306 is on static display at the Soesterberg Nationaal Militair Museum in Soesterberg, Netherlands
- A former Royal Netherlands Air Force Lockheed 12-26 c/n 1313 is on static display at Arlanda Flygsamlingar, near Stockholm-Arlanda airport. Swedish airline Airtaco acquired the aircraft in 1953 for newspaper freights. Registration SE-BXU was reserved but was never accepted into the registry. Donated to Arlanda Flygsamlingar in 1990.
- An Indonesian Air Force Lockheed 12A registration number T-303 is on static display at Suryadarma Air Force Base in Subang Regency, Indonesia
- Former British Airways Ltd G-AFTL has been returned to flight in 2023 and is now flown on the UK display circuit.
- A former USAAC/RAF lend lease 12a once owned by Sidney Cotton's company Aeronautical and Industrial Research Corporation (G-AGWN) is undergoing static restoration in Parkes, New South Wales, Australia by HARS Parkes Aviation Museum.
- A flying Electra Junior - N14999 (owner Luc Hellings) is based at Genk Zwartberg airport and still flies fairly regularly to air shows around Belgium, the Netherlands and Germany.
- "Villa Electra" Registration NC18130 Serial number 1226 from 25 June 1937 still flying in Germany. Its home is the "Art Deco Hangar" at Hannover Airport.

== Specifications (Model 12A) ==
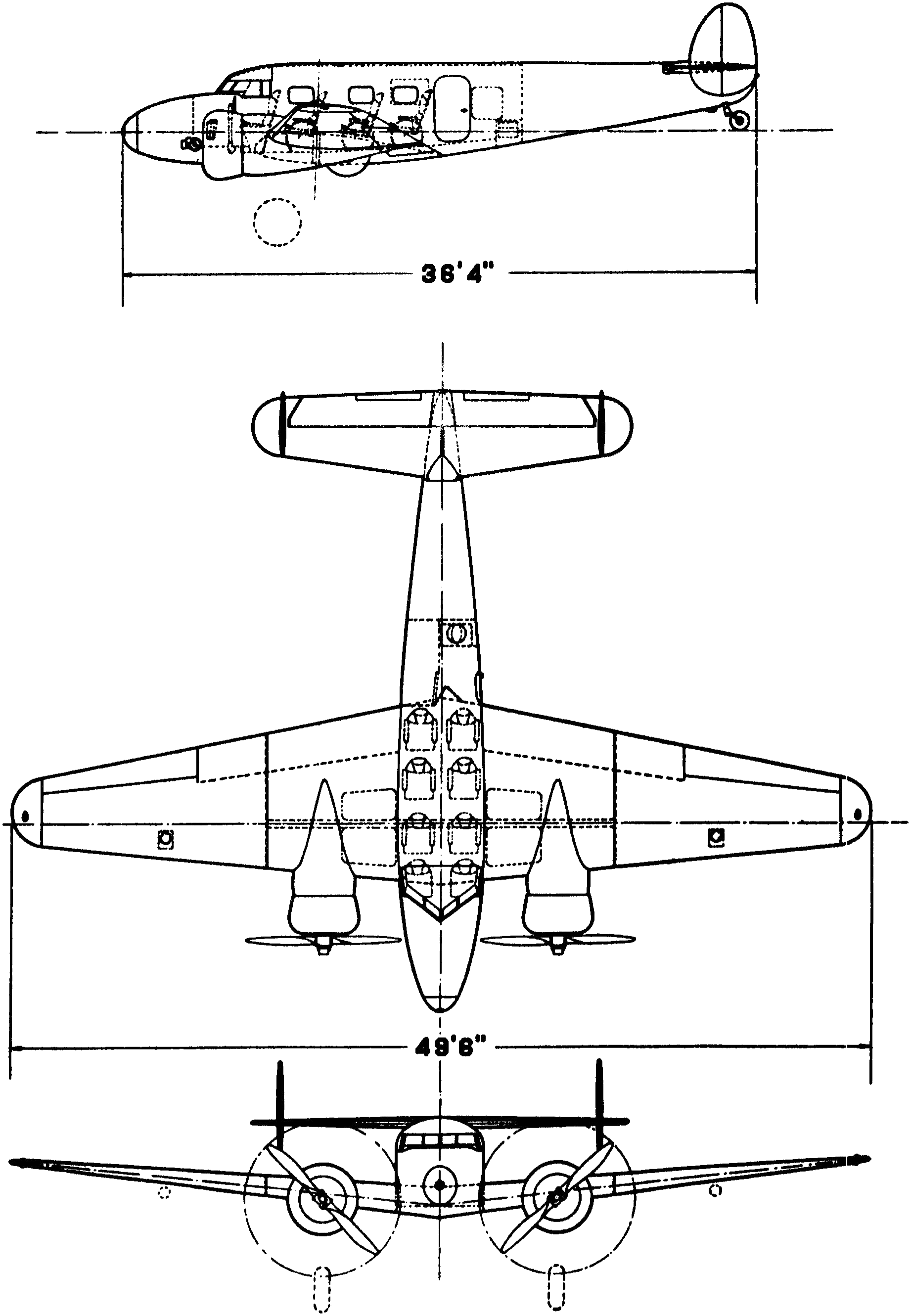
3-view line drawing of the Lockheed 12A Electra Junior

Data from Lockheed Aircraft since 1913

General characteristics

- Crew: 2
- Capacity: 6 passengers
- Length: 36 ft 4 in (11.07 m)
- Wingspan: 49 ft 6 in (15.09 m)
- Height: 9 ft 9 in (2.97 m)
- Wing area: 352 sq ft (32.7 m^{2})
- Empty weight: 5,765 lb (2,615 kg)
- Gross weight: 8,400 lb (3,810 kg)
- Max takeoff weight: 8,650 lb (3,924 kg)
- Powerplant: 2 × Pratt & Whitney R-985 Wasp Junior SB 9-cylinder air-cooled radial engines, 450 hp (340 kW) each

Performance

- Maximum speed: 225 mph (362 km/h, 196 kn) at 5,000 ft (1,500 m)
- Cruise speed: 213 mph (343 km/h, 185 kn)
- Range: 800 mi (1,300 km, 700 nmi)
- Service ceiling: 22,900 ft (7,000 m)
- Rate of climb: 1,400 ft/min (7.1 m/s)

== Notable appearances in media ==
A Lockheed 12 appeared as the French airliner in the climactic final scene from the 1942 film Casablanca. (The aircraft carries the Air France seahorse logo, although Air France did not actually operate the type 12A). A forced-perspective background "cut-out" stood in for a real Lockheed 12 in several shots. Due to then-recent war-time flight restrictions, no real aircraft appeared flying in the movie. Several close-ups of an actual Electra on the ground with engines running were inter-cut with half and quarter scale models. (Note: The real aircraft operating from Casablanca to Lisbon in 1942 was actually a Lockheed Model 18 Lodestar, operated by Portuguese company, Aeroportuguesa, the only airline from a neutral country allowed to fly the route.)

Lockheed 12s have also appeared in movies as stand-ins for the Electra 10E used by Amelia Earhart in her round-the-world flight attempt. Two played this role in the NBC 1976 TV miniseries Amelia Earhart, and another did so in the 2009 movie Amelia.

== See also ==
- Lockheed L-188 Electra, an unrelated Lockheed airliner later bearing the same name
- Mercy Plane, a 1939 film which used the Model 12 Electra Junior as the title aircraft

Related development

- Lockheed Model 10 Electra
- Lockheed Model 14 Super Electra

Aircraft of comparable role, configuration, and era

- Barkley-Grow T8P-1
- Beechcraft Model 18

Related lists

- List of aircraft of World War II
- List of Lockheed aircraft
- List of military aircraft of the United States
