= Lockheed XC-35 =

Experimental aircraft by Lockheed

XC-35
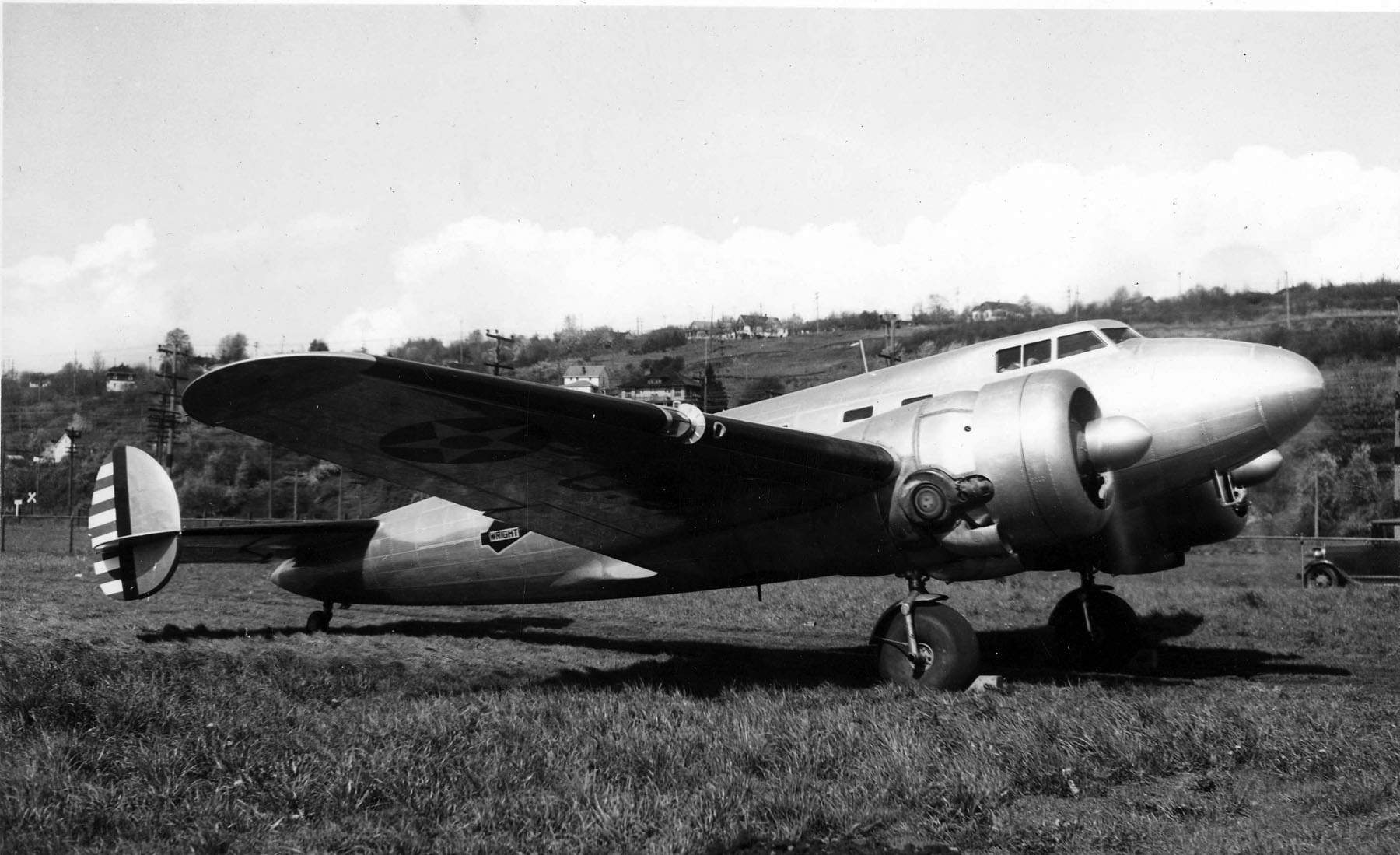
- Lockheed XC-35

General information
- Type: Experimental
- National origin: United States
- Manufacturer: Lockheed
- Status: In storage at the Smithsonian Institution's National Air and Space Museum
- Primary user: United States Army Air Corps
- Number built: 1

History
- Introduction date: 1937
- First flight: 9 May 1937
- Developed from: Lockheed Model 10 Electra

The Lockheed XC-35 is a twin-engine, experimental pressurized airplane. It was the second American aircraft to feature cabin pressurization. It was initially described as a "supercharged cabins" by the Army. The XC-35 was a development of the Lockheed Model 10 Electra that was designed to meet a 1935 request by the United States Army Air Corps for an aircraft with a pressurized cabin.

== Design and development ==
The United States Air Corps wanted the aircraft to perform high altitude research and to test the feasibility of a pressurized cabin. The Corps contracted with Lockheed Aircraft Corporation to produce the aircraft at a total cost of $112,197. The requirements called for an aircraft capable of flying at no less than 25,000 ft (7,620 m) and having an endurance of ten hours with at least two hours above 25,000 ft (7,620 m). Major Carl Greene and John Younger, both structures experts who worked for the Air Corps Engineering Division at Wright Field in Ohio were responsible for the design of the pressurized cabin structure. Greene and Younger worked with Lockheed to modify a Model 10 Electra with a new fuselage consisting of a circular cross-section that was able to withstand up to a 10 psi differential. New, smaller windows were used to prevent a possible blowout while operating at high pressure differentials. The cabin pressurization was provided by bleeding air from the engines' turbo supercharger, the compressor outlet fed into the cabin and was controlled by the flight engineer. This system was able to maintain a cabin altitude of 12,000 ft (3,658 m) while flying at 30,000 ft (9,144 m). The fuselage was divided into two compartments, a forward pressurized compartment, and an aft unpressurized compartment. The forward compartment housed two pilots, a flight engineer, and up to two passengers. The aft compartment provided accommodation for one passenger and could be used only at low altitudes since it lacked pressurization.

The XC-35 was fitted with two Pratt & Whitney XR-1340-43 engines of 550 hp (410 kW) each compared to the two Pratt & Whitney R-985-13 of 450 hp (336 kW) fitted to the base Model 10 Electra. The engines featured a turbo supercharger to permit the engines to operate in thin air at high altitudes.

== Operational history ==
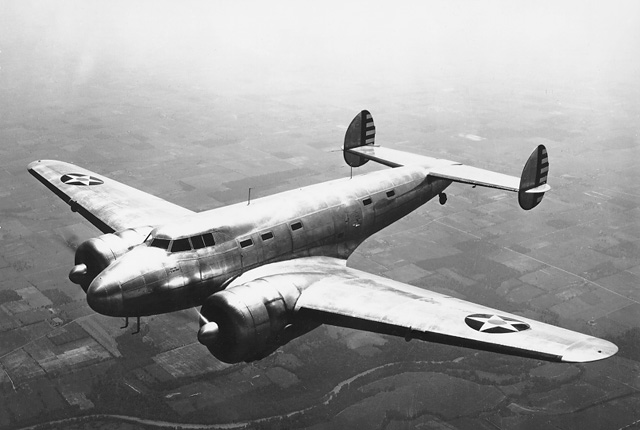
The XC-35 in flight

The XC-35 was delivered to Wright Field, Ohio in May 1937, made its first performance flight on 5 August, and was involved in an extensive flight testing program for which the Army Air Corps was awarded the Collier Trophy. The lessons learned from the XC-35 played a key role in the development of the Boeing 307 Stratoliner and the B-29 Superfortress which was to be the first mass-produced pressurized aircraft.

The Air Corps brass were so confident in the new technology that they allowed the XC-35 to be used as an executive transport for Louis Johnson, the Assistant Secretary of War and future Secretary of Defense.

In 1943, NACA pilot Herbert H. Hoover flew the XC-35 into thunderstorms to gather data on the effects of severe weather on aircraft in flight.

The XC-35 was donated to the Smithsonian Institution's National Air and Space Museum in 1948 and remains there in long-term storage.

== Specifications (Lockheed XC-35) ==
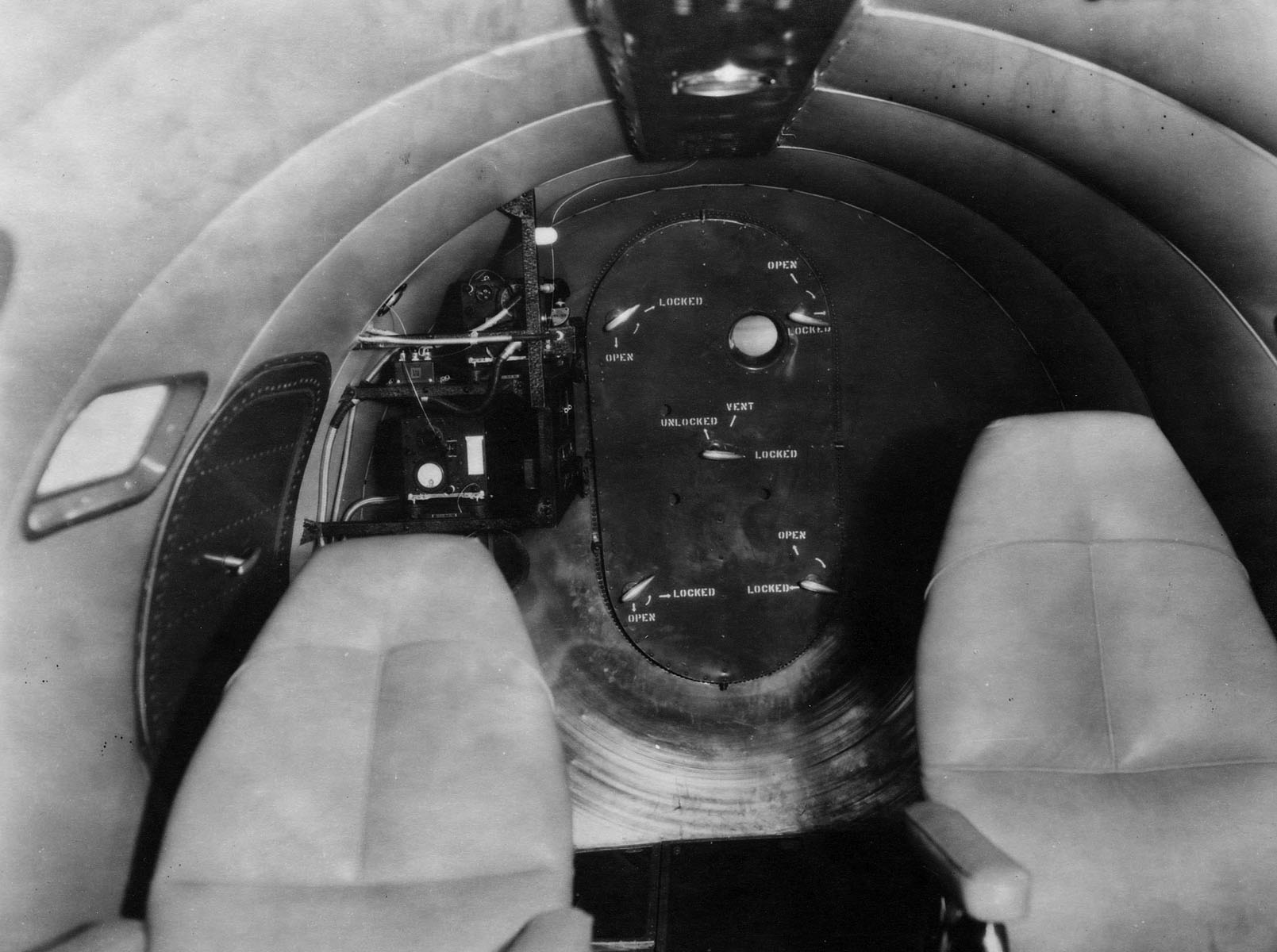
A view of the aft pressure bulkhead.

Data from Lockheed aircraft since 1913

General characteristics

- Crew: up to 6
- Length: 38 ft 7 in (11.76 m)
- Wingspan: 55 ft (17 m)
- Height: 10 ft 1 in (3.07 m)
- Wing area: 458.5 sq ft (42.60 m^{2})
- Airfoil: root: Clark Y (18%); tip: Clark Y (9%)
- Empty weight: 7,940 lb (3,602 kg)
- Gross weight: 10,500 lb (4,763 kg)
- Powerplant: 2 × Pratt & Whitney R-1340-43 9-cylinder turbo-supercharged air-cooled radial piston engine2, 550 hp (410 kW) each
- Propellers: 2-bladed variable-pitch propellers

Performance

- Maximum speed: 236 mph (380 km/h, 205 kn) at 20,000 ft (6,096 m)
- Cruise speed: 214 mph (344 km/h, 186 kn)
- Service ceiling: 31,500 ft (9,600 m)
- Rate of climb: 1,125 ft/min (5.72 m/s)
- Wing loading: 22.9 lb/sq ft (112 kg/m^{2})
- Power/mass: 0.105 hp/lb (0.173 kW/kg)

== See also ==
Related development

- Lockheed Model 10 Electra
