= Marshall Headle =

Marshall E. Headle
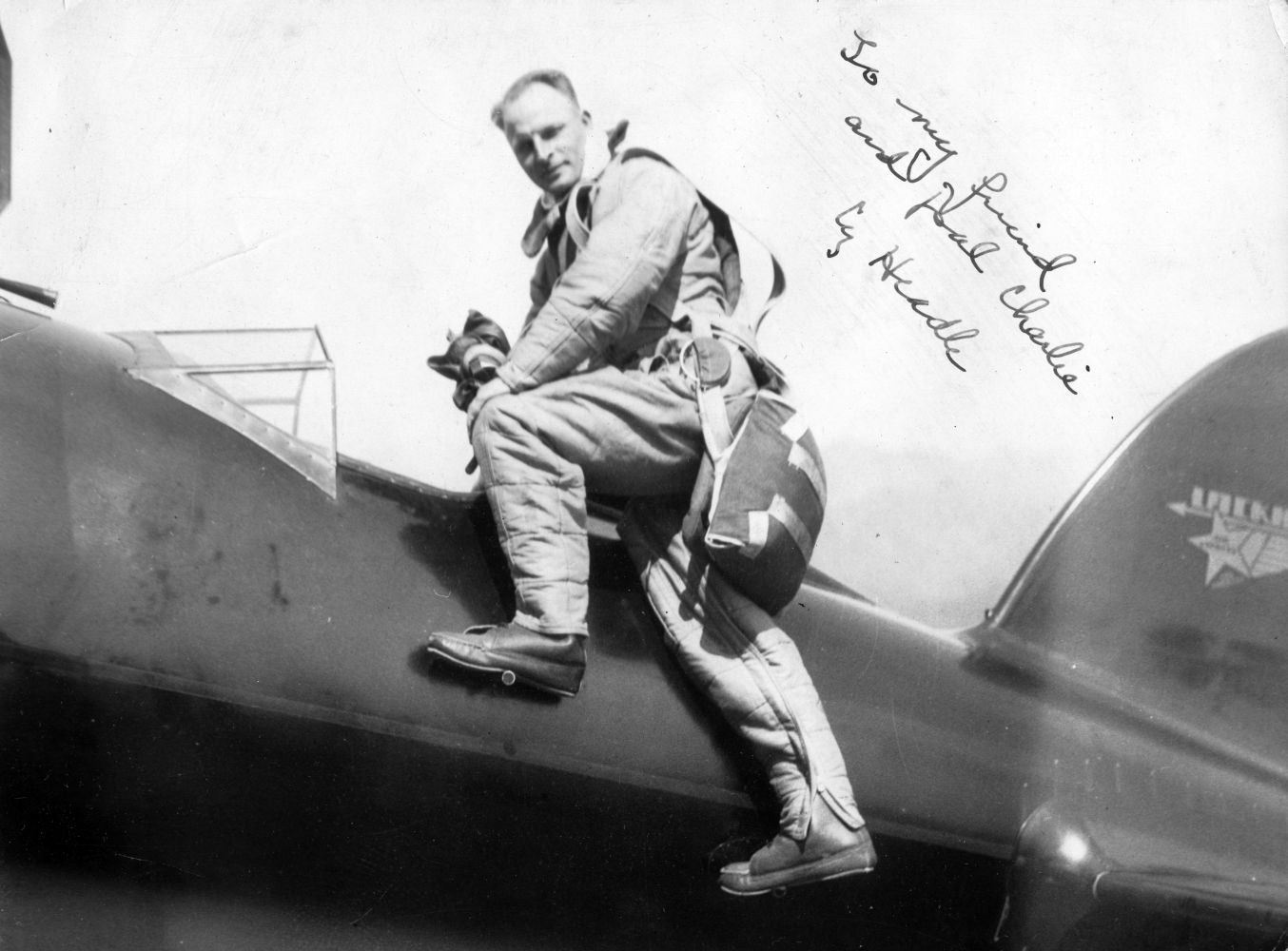
- San Diego Air and Space Museum Archive
- Born: March 21, 1893; Winthrop, Massachusetts, U.S.
- Died: May 14, 1945
- Occupation(s): Aviator, Test pilot

Marshall E. Headle (March 21, 1893 Winthrop, Massachusetts, United States - May 14, 1945) was a U.S. test pilot.

He is best known for his participation in the first Lockheed Aircraft company projects.

== Biography ==
In 1913, Marshall Headle graduated from the Massachusetts State College and decided to go to France after the start of First World War. He enlisted as a soldier, and soon became captivated by the flying machines he discovered during the conflict. He then asked to be transferred to the French Air Force and learned to fly.

After the entry of the United States in the conflict, he joined the US Air Service as an instructor in Tours and in Issoudun. After the war, he continued to fly in the US Marine Corps before becoming chief test pilot for Lockheed, succeeding Wiley Post. From 1935, his position at Lockheed evolved and he traveled the world on behalf of the company conducting demonstration flights as well as training for global customers.

A high-altitude chamber accident ended his flying career and led to a premature death May 14, 1945, at the age of 52. He had flown over 300 types of aircraft. In particular the first flight of Lockheed P-38 Lightning.
