= Trans-Canada Air Lines Flight 304 =

1956 aviation incident

Coordinates: 42°06′07″N 83°16′22″W

Trans-Canada Airlines Flight 304
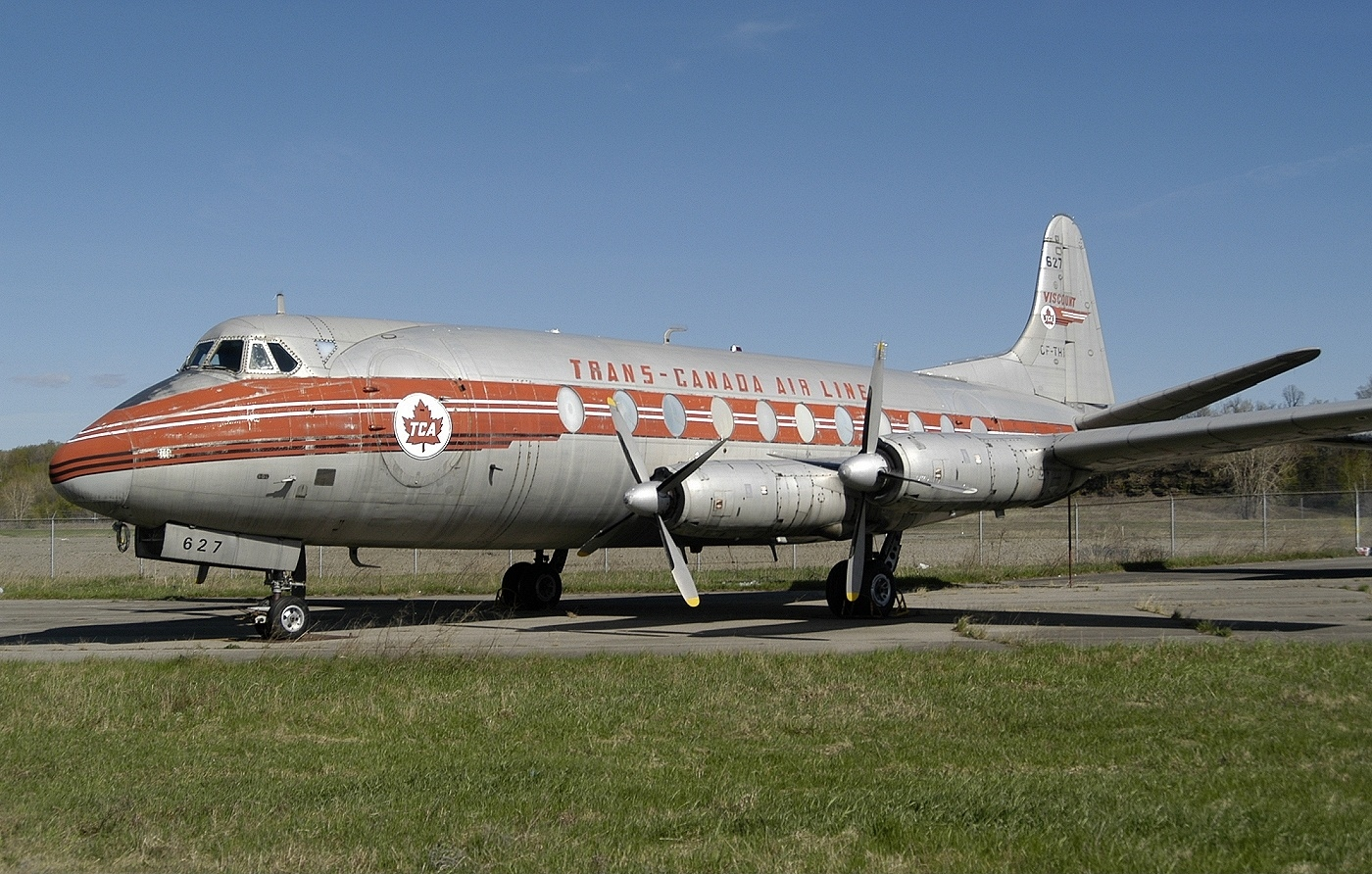
- A Vickers Viscount similar to the accident aircraft

Accident
- Date: July 9, 1956
- Summary: Mechanical failure
- Site: over Flat Rock, Michigan, United States

Aircraft
- Aircraft type: Vickers Viscount 724
- Operator: Trans-Canada Air Lines
- Registration: CF-TGR
- Flight origin: Chicago, Illinois, United States
- Destination: Toronto, Ontario, Canada
- Passengers: 31
- Crew: 4
- Fatalities: 1
- Injuries: 5
- Survivors: 34

Trans-Canada Air Lines Flight 304 was operated by a Vickers Viscount 700 aircraft owned by Trans-Canada Air Lines. On July 9, 1956, the No. 4 propeller of the aircraft tore loose from its engine over Flat Rock, Michigan in the United States, during a flight from Chicago, Illinois, to Toronto, Ontario, and Montreal, Quebec; one blade of the propeller sliced through the passenger section of the cabin, killing one passenger and injuring four passengers and one flight attendant. The aircraft diverted to Windsor, Ontario, in Canada, and the pilots carried out an emergency landing. The accident was the first to involve a Vickers Viscount aircraft in scheduled service, and was the first instance of a propeller loss on a turbo-prop aircraft.

== Aircraft background ==
Trans-Canada Air Lines was the first North American airline to accept delivery of the Viscount. Unlike piston engined aircraft (such as the Douglas DC-6 and the Lockheed Constellation) commonly flown by North American airlines, the Viscount was a quiet aircraft whose engines produced a minimum of vibration. Since the Viscount's Rolls-Royce Dart engines ran so much more smoothly than piston engines, engineers at Vickers believed propeller loss would be unlikely.

== Accident details ==
On the morning of July 9, while the aircraft was cruising at flight level 190 over the town of Flat Rock, Michigan, the No. 4 engine on the aircraft experienced a drop in RPM. The engine then sped to 14,000 RPM, significantly above the engine's normal cruise figure. As pilots attempted to feather the propeller, the engine sped up even more, the aircraft's indicated airspeed decreased, and the pilots declared an emergency and began an immediate emergency descent, depressurising the cabin as they did so. Less than a minute later and as the aircraft descended through 9,000 feet, the propeller attached to the No. 4 engine broke loose. One of the four propeller blades penetrated the passenger cabin and cut through the first row of seats, immediately killing a young woman travelling with her two small children. The blade also injured a family of three sitting across the aisle from the victim and a flight attendant who had been standing at the front of the cabin. The children of the victim were not injured. The pilots eventually landed the aircraft at Windsor, Ontario; they learned only after landing that there had been casualties in the passenger cabin. One small section of the blade remained in the cabin, while the main section of the blade and the other three blades from the propeller were found on the ground in the vicinity of Flat Rock.

Canadian accident investigators found that a bevel gear in the oil pump drive had failed, shutting off lubrication to the propeller. This caused the propeller to decouple from the engine, allowing it to windmill at high speed. Moreover, during the emergency descent, the pilots had allowed the aircraft's airspeed to increase too close to the maximum allowable. This put significant strain on the windmilling propeller and in all probability caused it to fail in flight. The possibility of the bevel gear drive failing causing the propeller to windmill had not been foreseen by Vickers engineers, and there was therefore no mention of it in the training or operations manual.

The accident forced aircraft designers and engineers to rethink their assumption that turbo-prop aircraft would be less likely to suffer propeller loss.

== Aircraft ==
The aircraft was a four-engined Vickers Viscount that first flew in the United Kingdom in 1955. It was delivered new to Trans-Canada Air Lines on 21 June 1955. It was sold to a private American operator in January 1964 before being sold to Air Inter in France in June 1965. It was withdrawn from use at Orly Airport in October 1974 before being broken up and scrapped during 1975.
