= Routine Flight =

- Screen shot of title frame
- Directed by: Gordon Burwash
- Written by: Gordon Burwash
- Produced by: Gordon Burwash; Grant McLean
- Narrated by: Liston McIlhagga
- Cinematography: Grant McLean; John Locke (sound)
- Edited by: David Mayerovitch; Marion Meadows
- Production company: National Film Board of Canada (NFB)
- Distributed by: Canadian Broadcasting Corporation / CBC Television
- Release date: 1955; (Note: The NFB lists Routine Flight as a 1955 production.)
- Running time: 30 minutes
- Country: Canada
- Language: English

Routine Flight is a 1955 Canadian short documentary film produced by the National Film Board of Canada (NFB) as part of the On The Spot series made specifically for television. The documentary, directed by Gordon Burwash, involved an account of a visit to a Trans-Canada Air Lines (TCA) maintenance centre while it is involved in transitioning to a new type of airliner. Routine Flight is based on first-person interviews of the staff at the maintenance centre and flight crew on a test flight.

== Synopsis ==
In 1955, Winnipeg Airport is one of the main bases of Trans-Canada Air Lines, housing the airline's largest maintenance centre. One of the main functions of the base is to overhaul piston and jet engines in an engine shop as part of a complex system of operational and maintenance routines that underline the safe operation of each TCA aircraft.

The TCA Canadair North Star airliner has its Rolls-Royce Merlin piston engines overhauled in Winnipeg on a regular schedule. Engine parts are tested, and depending on damage that is detected, may be repaired or replaced. An engine test bay is also available to ensure the engines are ready to go back onto the North Stars.

With the TCA purchase of the British-built Vickers Viscount turboprop-powered airliner, the Winnipeg base is also in the midst of introducing jet engine technology for its engineering staff and technicians. TCA is the first North American carrier to use turboprop aircraft and air crews are also working up procedures to introduce the new airliner. The first Viscount is carrying out orientation flights for ground and air crews and the On the Spot crew are invited to come aboard on a test flight.

== Cast ==
- Liston McIlhagga, Reporter
- George Pitlick, Superintendent of Maintenance and Overhaul, Winnipeg TCA Base
- Jim McLean, Winnipeg TCA Base Maintenance
- Nelson Harvey, Winnipeg Airport Air Traffic Controller
- Captain Hobson, pilot instructor (left hand seat)
- Captain Tom Payton, pilot instructor (In passenger cabin)
- Captain Rene Giguere, pilot manager/instructor (right seat)

== Production ==
The On The Spot series debuted in 1953, with the 39 episodes, initially 15 minutes in length. For the second season, NFB produced 30-minute episodes. Routine Flight was typical of the longer On The Spot series. Each segment was produced with a three-person crew: a director, cameraman and on-screen host, usually Fred Davis who acted as the interviewer and narrator, although other journalists were involved.

== Reception ==
Routine Flight was shown on NFB's On the Spot series, originated by Bernard Devlin, the first series made specifically for television by the National Film Board of Canada. The series aired on CBC Television for two seasons from 1953 to 1954. Drawing on the experiences of the earlier wartime Canada Carries On and concurrent The World in Action documentary series, each On the Spot episode reported on a different aspect of life in Canada. The series underwent a number of challenges with time slots frequently changed, episodes playing as late as 11:45 pm on Monday nights before going to Sundays at 4:30 pm. The second season aired on Sundays at 10 pm. On the Spot was cancelled after the 26 episodes of the second season, with Routine Flight one of the last episodes, and listed as a 1955 production.
