= Trans-Canada Air Lines =

Canadian flag-carrier airline (1937–1965)

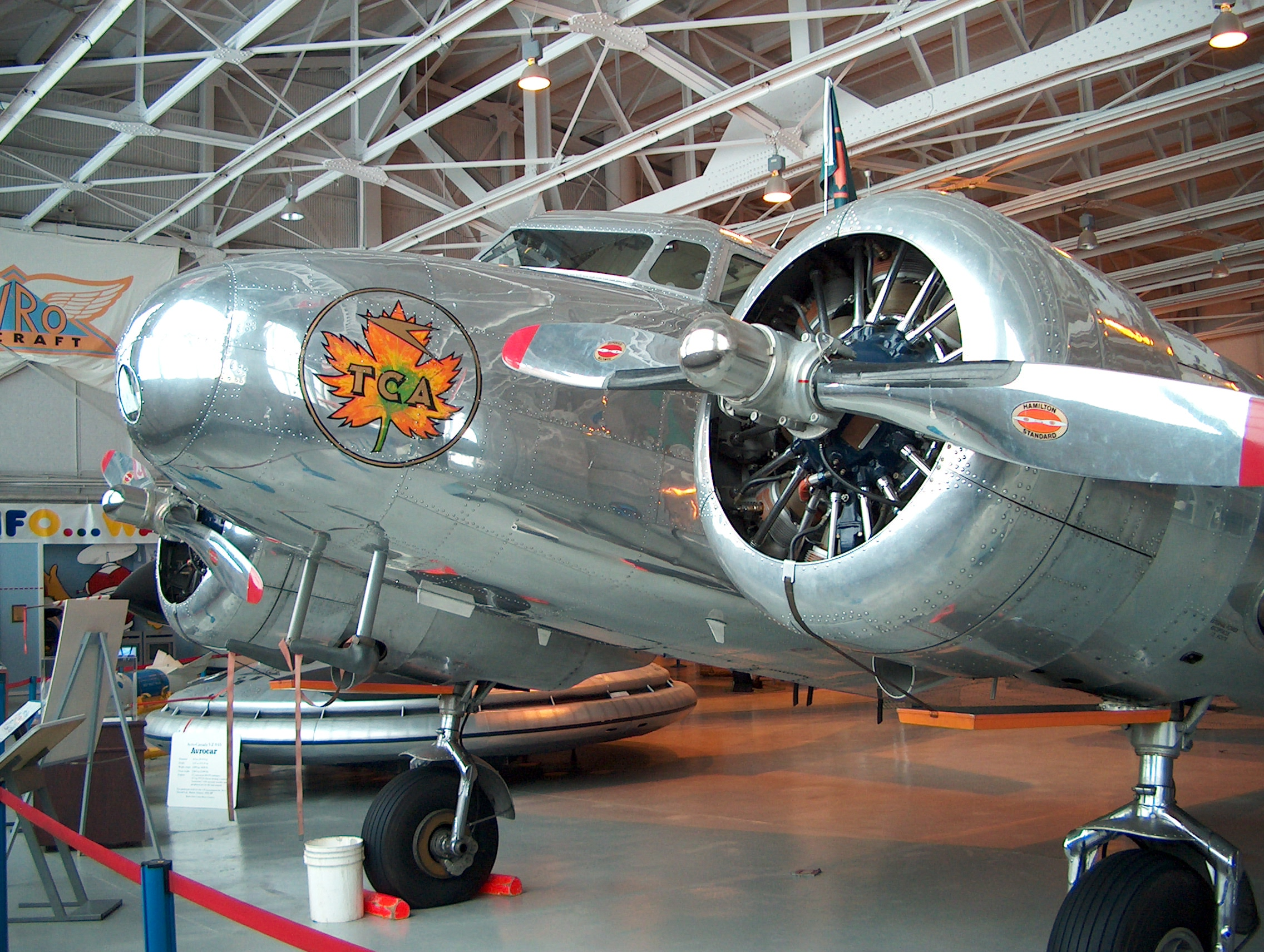
- Lockheed Electra 10A "CF-TCC" in Trans-Canada Air Lines livery at the Western Canada Aviation Museum
- Founded: 10 April 1937
- Commenced operations: 1 September 1937
- Ceased operations: 1 January 1965 (renamed Air Canada by an Act of Parliament)
- Operating bases: Montreal, Quebec
- Subsidiaries: Canadian Government Trans-Atlantic Air Service
- Fleet size: 123
- Parent company: Canadian National Railway
- Headquarters: Montreal, Quebec, Canada
- Key people: Gordon McGregor

Trans-Canada Air Lines (also known as TCA in English, and Trans-Canada in French) was a Canadian airline that operated as the country's flag carrier, with corporate headquarters in Montreal, Quebec. Its first president was Gordon Roy McGregor. Founded in 1937, it was renamed Air Canada in 1965.

== History ==
With heavy involvement from C. D. Howe, a senior minister in the Mackenzie King cabinet, TCA was created by the Crown Corporation Canadian National Railway (CNR), and launched its first flight on 1 September 1937, on a flight between Vancouver and Seattle. An air-mail contract with Royal Mail Canada was one of the methods by which TCA was financed.

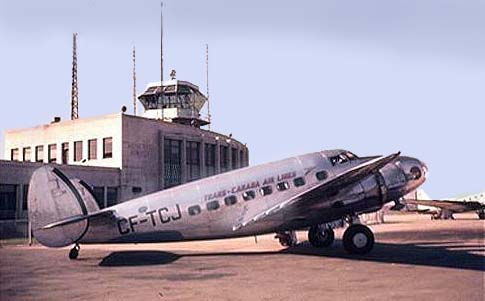
A Lockheed Model 14 of Trans-Canada Air Lines, c. 1938

The creation of TCA was partly by CNR management who wanted to expand the company into the new field of passenger aviation, and was partly by government direction. Prior to TCA, no large national airline existed in Canada. With war looming, and other nations (primarily the U.S.) experiencing major increases in the creation of passenger airlines, it was necessary to have a presence. The CNR was the country's largest corporation at the time and proved an effective vehicle for the government to create a national airline.

TCA was also in direct competition with passenger trains operated by parent CNR, and contributed to the decline of passenger rail service as Canada entered the pioneering years of air travel. In response to CNR's creation of TCA, arch-rival Canadian Pacific Railway created Canadian Pacific Air Lines in 1942.

Between 1943 and 1947, TCA operated the Canadian Government Trans-Atlantic Air Service (CGTAS) to provide trans-Atlantic military passenger and postal delivery service using Avro Lancastrian (modified Avro Lancaster) aircraft. The record crossing was completed non-stop in 12:26 hours; the average was about 13:25 hours. CGTAS ushered in the era of commercial air travel across the North Atlantic. After the war, the Lancastrians became part of TCA and carried paying civilian passengers until they were replaced by Douglas DC-4s.

=== Postwar ===
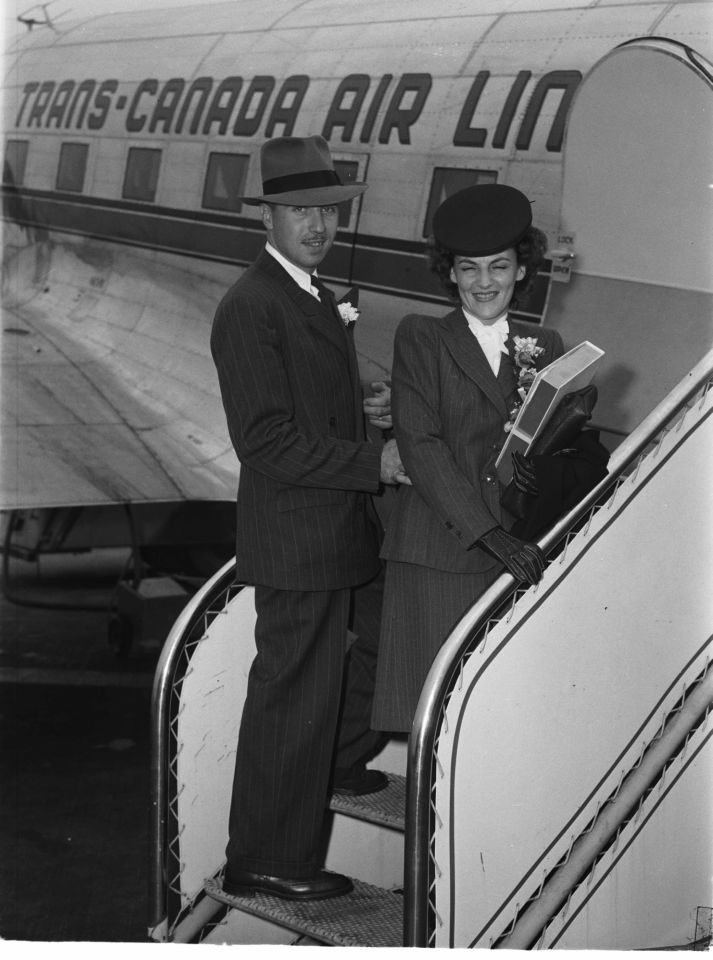
Newlyweds leaving for their honeymoon boarding a Trans-Canada Air Lines' plane, Montreal, 1946

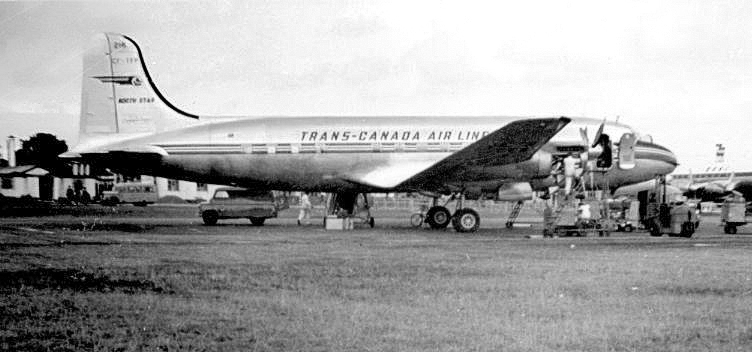
Trans-Canada Air Lines Canadair North Star at London Heathrow in 1951

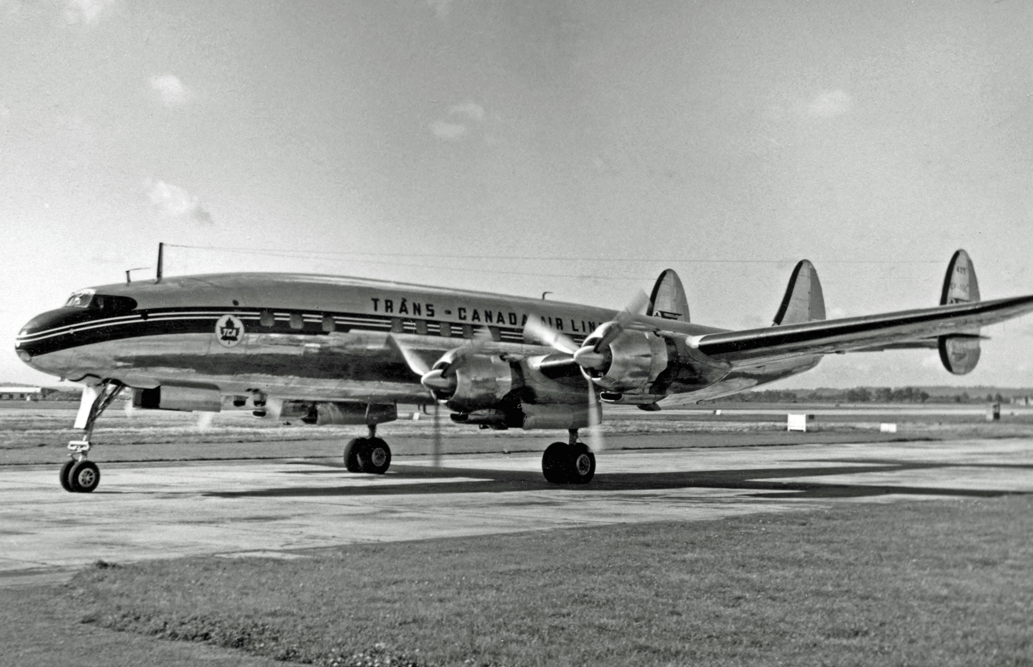
Trans-Canada Air Lines Lockheed Super Constellation arriving at London (Heathrow) in 1954

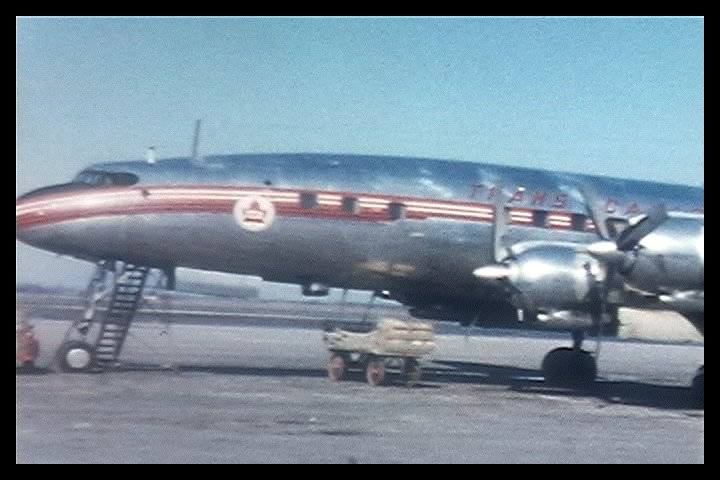
Lockheed Super Constellation showing colour of TCA markings; 1956, Montreal

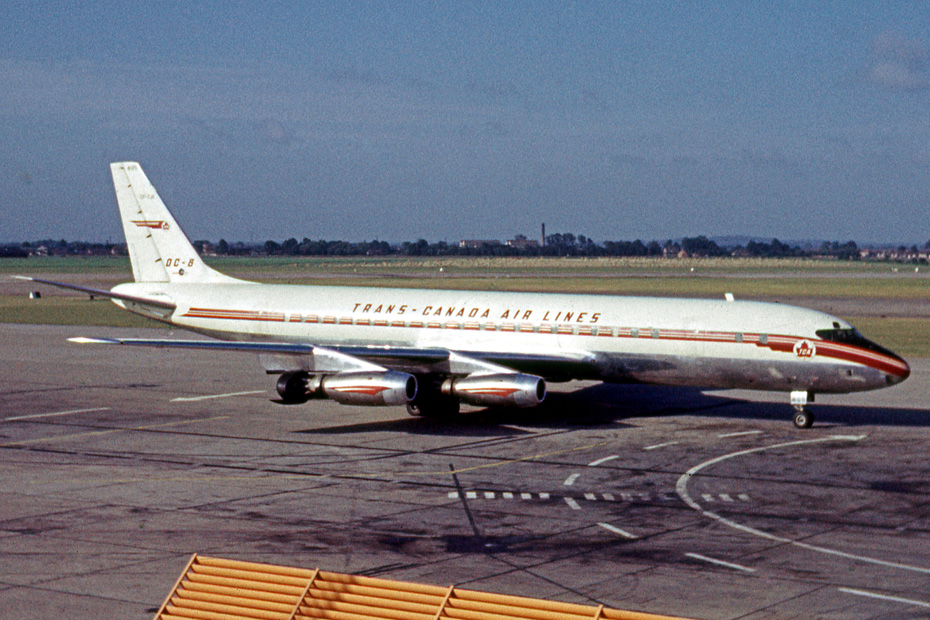
TCA Douglas DC-8 at London Heathrow Airport in 1962

Starting in 1945, TCA acquired 30 twin-engined ex-military Douglas DC-3s for use on Canadian internal services and some of these remained in service until 1963 on shorter routes. A fleet of Merlin-powered Canadair North Stars was delivered from 1947 and these commenced services to several European countries, including the United Kingdom and to cities in the U.S. The last of the North Stars was sold in 1961.

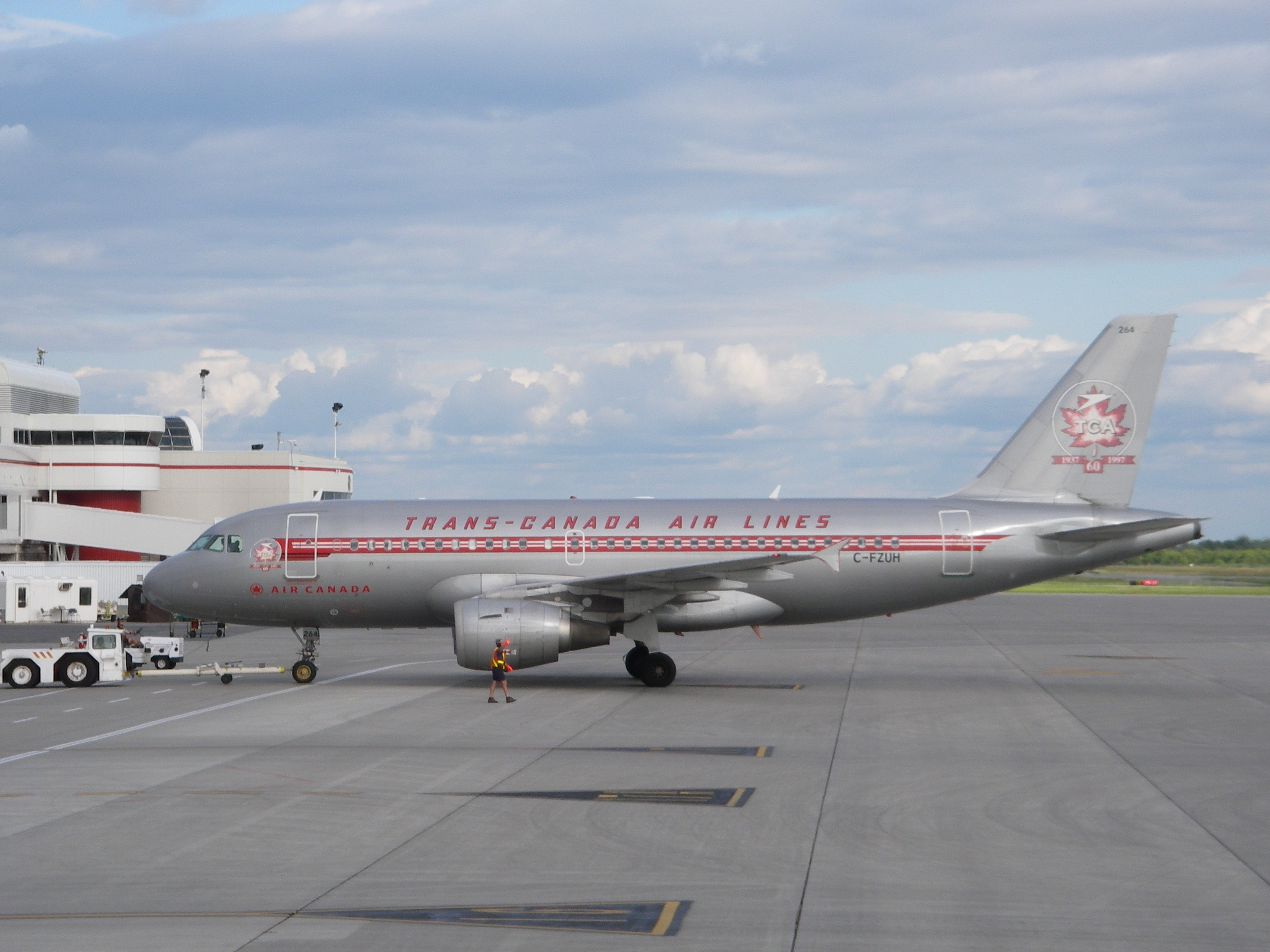
Air Canada Airbus A319 (fin 264) painted in TCA colours for the 60th anniversary of the Airline, in 1997 (aircraft retired in 2020)

Air Canada Airbus A220 (registration C-GNBN, tail number 119) in TCA livery

The Canadair North Stars were gradually replaced by longer range Lockheed Super Constellations from 1954 onwards, fourteen being operated on transatlantic routes extending as far as Vienna in Austria; also to Bermuda and several Caribbean destinations including Jamaica and Trinidad. The last Super Constellations were disposed of in 1963. A large fleet of Vickers Viscount turboprop airliners was built up from late 1954 and these were used on many intra-North American routes. The Viscount was followed by the larger Vickers Vanguard turboprop. TCA was the only airline in North America to operate the Vanguard in scheduled passenger service.

In 1953 with the development of ReserVec (originally called Gemini), TCA became the first airline in the world to use a computer reservation system with remote terminals.

The airline's Winnipeg maintenance shops and its first trial flight of the Viscount was documented in the 1955 film, Routine Flight.

The airline acquired a fleet of Douglas DC-8 jet airliners powered by Rolls-Royce Conways, the first being received on 25 May 1960. The DC-8 quickly replaced the slower Super Constellations on TCA's scheduled services to Europe.

=== Changes ===
In 1964, an Act of Parliament proposed by Jean Chrétien changed the name of Trans-Canada Air Lines to "Air Canada", which was already in use as the airline's French-language name, effective 1 January 1965. In 1978, Air Canada was divested by parent CNR and became a separate Crown corporation. Air Canada was privatized in 1989.

== Corporate affairs ==
The headquarters were in the International Aviation Building in Montreal.

== Destinations ==
TCA operated a network of 160 routes to destinations including:

- St. John's, Newfoundland
- Stephenville, Newfoundland
- Gander, Newfoundland
- Halifax, Nova Scotia
- Sydney, Nova Scotia
- Fredericton, New Brunswick
- Victoria, British Columbia
- Vancouver, British Columbia
- Penticton, British Columbia
- Boston, Massachusetts
- New York City, New York
- Winnipeg, Manitoba
- Brandon, Manitoba
- Calgary, Alberta
- Chicago, Illinois
- Cleveland, Ohio
- Edmonton, Alberta
- Lethbridge, Alberta
- Montreal, Quebec
- Ottawa, Ontario
- London, Ontario
- Tampa, Florida
- Toronto, Ontario
- Detroit (Windsor)
- Seattle, Washington
- London, England
- Paris, France
- Prestwick, Scotland
- Shannon, Ireland
- Düsseldorf, Germany
- St. George's Parish, Bermuda
- Nassau, Bahamas
- Kingston, Jamaica
- Christ Church, Barbados
- Piarco, Trinidad

== Fleet ==
Trans-Canada Air Lines fleet
Aircraft	In service	Passengers	Years in service
Vickers Viscount		48	1955–1974
Vickers Vanguard		108	1961–1972
Canadair North Star DC-4M-2	20	44	1946–1961
Douglas DC-8-40, 50	8	176 (economy), 124 (mixed)	1960–1983
Lockheed 10A Electra	5	10	1937–1941
Lockheed L-1049C/E/G/H Super Constellation	14	53-75	1954–1963
Bristol Freighter	3	freight only; 2 crew	1953–1955
Douglas DC-3	27	21	1945–1963
Avro Lancaster Mk III - for freight/mail service and priority passengers	1	unknown	1943
Avro Lancastrian - for freight/mail service and priority passengers	9	10	1943–1947
Lockheed 18-08 Lodestar	15	14	1941–1949
Lockheed Super Electra 14H2 (14-08)	16; 12 as 14-08 after conversion	10	1938–1949
Boeing-Stearman Model 75 - as trainer only	3	2	1937–1939

=== Aircraft on display ===
One former TCA Lockheed L-1049G Super Constellation (CF-TGE), has been preserved by The Museum of Flight in Seattle, Washington. It is currently on display at the museum's "Airpark" attraction.

A former TCA Vickers Viscount (CF-THG) is on display at the British Columbia Aviation Museum in Sidney, British Columbia. The aircraft has been completely refurbished by the museum.

A former TCA and Transair operated Vickers Viscount 744 (CF-TGI / N22SN) is on display at the Pima Air & Space Museum in Tucson, Arizona, USA.

== Accidents and incidents ==
Trans-Canada Air Lines had 13 aircraft accidents resulting in hull losses, with a total of 248 fatalities, between 1938 and 1963. These included:

Date	Flight number	Information
18 November 1938	Flight 1	Lockheed 14H-2, Fin 34 CF-TCL was on a flight from Winnipeg, Manitoba, to Vancouver, British Columbia, with a load of mail. After a stop in Regina, Saskatchewan, the aircraft crashed after takeoff, killing both pilots.
6 February 1941		Lockheed 14H-2, Fin 38 CF-TCP was landing at Armstrong, Thunder Bay District, Ontario, during the night and crashed a mile short of the airport. A total of nine passengers and three crew were killed.
4 November 1943		Lockheed 18 Lodestar, Fin 46 CF-TCX lost power to both engines on takeoff from Toronto-Malton Airport and landed in a field. There were no injuries, but the aircraft was written off.
28/29 December 1944		Avro Lancastrian, Fin 102 CF-CMU crashed into the sea off the Azores during a nighttime eastbound Atlantic crossing. There were no survivors.
27 February 1945		Lockheed 14H-2, Fin 28 CF-TCF written off at Moncton, New Brunswick.
1 July 1945		Avro Lancaster, Fin 100 CF-CMS crashed and burned at Montreal-Dorval International Airport after a training flight.
2 September 1946		Lockheed 14H-2, Fin 32 CF-TCJ crashed at Moncton, New Brunswick, during training, killing two pilots.
23 January 1947		Lockheed 14H-2, Fin 39 CF-TCQ crashed near Winnipeg, Manitoba, killing two pilots.
28 April 1947	Flight 3	Lockheed 18 Lodestar, Fin 53 CF-TDF disappeared in southwestern British Columbia with 15 people on board. The crash site was discovered 47 years later with no survivors, in September 1994, on Mount Elsay in North Vancouver, B.C.
12 August 1948		Canadair DC-4M-1 North Star, Fin 185 CF-TEL crash-landed in flames short of the Sydney, Nova Scotia, runway. All 11 passengers plus crew escaped.
8 April 1954	Flight 9	RCAF Harvard Mark II #3309 collided in midair with TCA Canadair C-4 North Star, Fin 223 CF-TFW over Moose Jaw, Saskatchewan, killing 36 (Harvard: pilot, North Star: 31 passengers, four crew) people on the aircraft and one person on the ground.
17 December 1954	Flight 661	Lockheed 1049E Super Constellation, Fin 407 CF-TGG undershot the runway while attempting to land at Toronto-Malton Airport and crashed in Brampton farmland, with all 16 passengers and seven crew surviving. The captain of this flight later died in a crash in 1957.
9 July 1956	Flight 304	Vickers Viscount, Fin 610 CF-TGR propeller separated from the turboprop over Flat Rock, Michigan, slicing into the cabin and killing one passenger.
9 December 1956	Flight 810	Canadair DC-4M-2 North Star, Fin 204 CF-TFD crashed near Chilliwack, British Columbia, after encountering severe icing and turbulence, resulting in the death of all 62 people on board.
10 November 1958		TCA Vickers Viscount, Fin 604 CF-TGL parked at Idlewild Airport, New York, was destroyed by fire while awaiting passengers after it was struck by Seaboard & Western Airlines Lockheed 1049D Super Constellation N6503C which had crashed while taking off. The two crew members on board survived the accident.
3 November 1959		Vickers Viscount, Fin 617 CF-TGY was written off when it landed short of the runway at Toronto-Malton Airport. All 40 on board survived.
10 October 1962	Flight 455	Vickers Viscount, Fin 619 CF-THA was involved in a ground collision with CF-101 Voodoo 17452 of the Royal Canadian Air Force at RCAF Station Bagotville. The Voodoo had been given clearance to take off before the Viscount had cleared the runway. It collided with the tail of the Viscount, killing a flight attendant and a passenger. The crew of the Voodoo ejected, as the aircraft had been set afire as a result of the collision. The Viscount was substantially damaged, but it was repaired and returned to service.
6 November 1963	Flight 861	Douglas DC-8 was taking off from runway 28L at London Heathrow Airport on a flight to Montreal, Quebec, with seven crew and 90 passengers on board. As the aircraft passed 132 knots on its takeoff roll, the captain pulled back on the control column. He mistakenly believed there was no response from the elevators, and he aborted the takeoff. As a result, the aircraft passed the end of the runway and it came to rest 800 yards past the end of the runway in a cabbage field. All passengers and crew on board survived the accident, and the aircraft was repaired and returned to service.
29 November 1963	Flight 831	Douglas DC-8-54F, Fin 814 CF-TJN crashed shortly after takeoff from Montreal-Dorval International Airport in a field near Ste-Thérèse, resulting in the deaths of all 118 people on board.

== See also ==
- List of defunct airlines of Canada
- Canadian National Railway
- Canadian Airways
- Canadian Airlines
- History of aviation in Canada
- ReserVec
