= Trans-Canada Air Lines Flight 3 =

1947 aviation accident in Canada

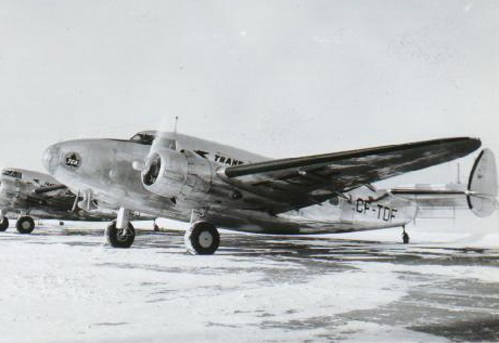
- CF-TDF, the aircraft involved in the accident

Accident
- Date: April 28, 1947
- Summary: Stall for undetermined reasons, possibly due to icing.
- Site: Near Mount Elsay in Vancouver, British Columbia, Canada

Aircraft
- Aircraft type: Lockheed 18-08A Lodestar
- Operator: Trans-Canada Air Lines
- Registration: CF-TDF
- Flight origin: Toronto Pearson International Airport, Ontario, Canada
- 1st stopover: Lethbridge Airport, Alberta, Canada
- Destination: Vancouver International Airport, British Columbia, Canada
- Occupants: 15
- Passengers: 12
- Crew: 3
- Fatalities: 15
- Survivors: 0

On April 28, 1947, a Lockheed 18-08A Lodestar operating as Trans-Canada Air Lines Flight 3 crashed near Mount Elsay in Vancouver, British Columbia, Canada, killing all 15 occupants. The wreckage was not discovered until 1992.

== Background ==
=== Aircraft ===
The aircraft involved in the accident was a Lockheed 18-08A Lodestar manufactured in 1942 and operated by Trans-Canada Air Lines with the registration CF-TDF. It was powered by two Pratt & Whitney R-1690 Hornet radial engines.

=== Passengers and crew ===
The occupants consisted of three crew members and 12 passengers. The flight was piloted by Bill Pike, a former fighter jet pilot. The two other crew members were 22-year-old Margaret Trerise and 25-year-old Anatasia (Nell) Lesiuk, both flight attendants travelling on stand-by. The passengers were Jane Warren and Margaret Hamblin, 21-year-old student nurses at Vancouver General Hospital, lumber buyer David Vance who was from Winnipeg, Manitoba, married couple Marjorie and Cecil Nugent, also from Winnipeg, travelling for their honeymoon, executive with Famous Players Victor Armand, divisional manager of Aro Equipment Lance Millor, businessman James Woolf, Quebec citizen Clarence Reaper and Winnipeg citizen W. Robson.

== Crash ==
The aircraft took off from Toronto Pearson International Airport in Toronto, Ontario, en route to Vancouver International Airport in Richmond, British Columbia, with a stopover at Lethbridge Airport in Lethbridge, Alberta. It crashed at approximately 11:13 p.m. while on approach to Vancouver International Airport in low visibility. A search and rescue operation involving 19 aircraft, four crash boats, a supply vessel and a United States Coast Guard craft was launched in a large area but got suspended a few days later as no wreckage or occupants were located.

The wreckage was discovered by two hikers in 1992 on a wooded hillside in a remote area west of Mount Elsay. Searchers were led to the site on September 27, 1994. Two memorials were set up at the crash site on the 48th anniversary.

== Investigation ==
It is believed that the aircraft stalled and crashed in a pretty steep attitude, possibly due to icing.
