= Gordon Roy McGregor =

Canadian businessman (1901–1971)

- Born: September 26, 1901; Montreal, Quebec, Canada
- Died: March 3, 1971 (aged 69); Montreal, Quebec, Canada
- Occupation: Businessman
- Known for: First president of Air Canada
- Awards: Companion of the Order of Canada; Officer of the Order of the British Empire

Gordon Roy McGregor, CC OBE DFC (September 26, 1901 – March 3, 1971) was a Canadian businessman and the first president of Air Canada.

== Early life ==
Born in Montreal, Quebec, he graduated from McGill University in 1923 with a degree in engineering. From 1923 until 1939, he worked for the Bell Telephone Company becoming Central District Manager. His flying career began at Kingston, Ontario, in 1932 and the following year he gained his pilot's license at Ottawa.

== Military service ==
In 1936, he joined the Royal Canadian Air Force (RCAF) Reserve and obtained his RCAF wing in 1938 and was promoted to Flying Officer. His promotions were Flight Lieutenant (1940), Flight Lieutenant (1940), Squadron Leader (1940), Wing Commander (1941), and Group Captain (1942). He was released from service on November 27, 1945.

During the Battle of Britain, he flew Hurricanes in No. 401 Squadron RCAF, and was its top scoring pilot, being credited with five victories.

== Post-war career ==
In 1946, he joined Trans-Canada Air Lines and later was named president serving until 1968.

== Honours and decorations ==
He was awarded the Distinguished Flying Cross, made an Officer of the Order of the British Empire, made a Commander of the Order of Orange-Nassau with Swords (Netherlands), awarded the Croix de Guerre with Silver Star (France), awarded the Czechoslovak War Cross 1939–1945 and was Mentioned in Dispatches three times.

In 1968, he was made a Companion of the Order of Canada. In 1973 he was inducted into Canada's Aviation Hall of Fame. In 2004, he was inducted into Canada's Business Hall of Fame.

The Royal Canadian Air Force Association's Gordon R. McGregor Trophy is named in his honour.
