= Trans-Canada Air Lines Flight 9 =

1954 mid-air collision

Accident
- Date: April 8, 1954
- Summary: Mid-air collision
- Site: Moose Jaw, Saskatchewan
- Total fatalities: 37
- Total survivors: 0

First aircraft
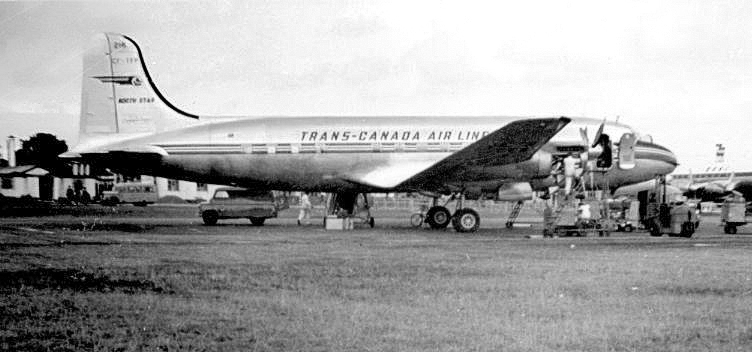
- A Canadair C-4 North Star of Trans-Canada Air Lines similar to the accident aircraft
- Type: Canadair C-4 North Star
- Operator: Trans-Canada Air Lines
- Registration: CF-TFW
- Flight origin: Winnipeg
- Stopover: Calgary
- Destination: Vancouver
- Occupants: 35
- Passengers: 31
- Crew: 4
- Fatalities: 35
- Survivors: 0

Second aircraft
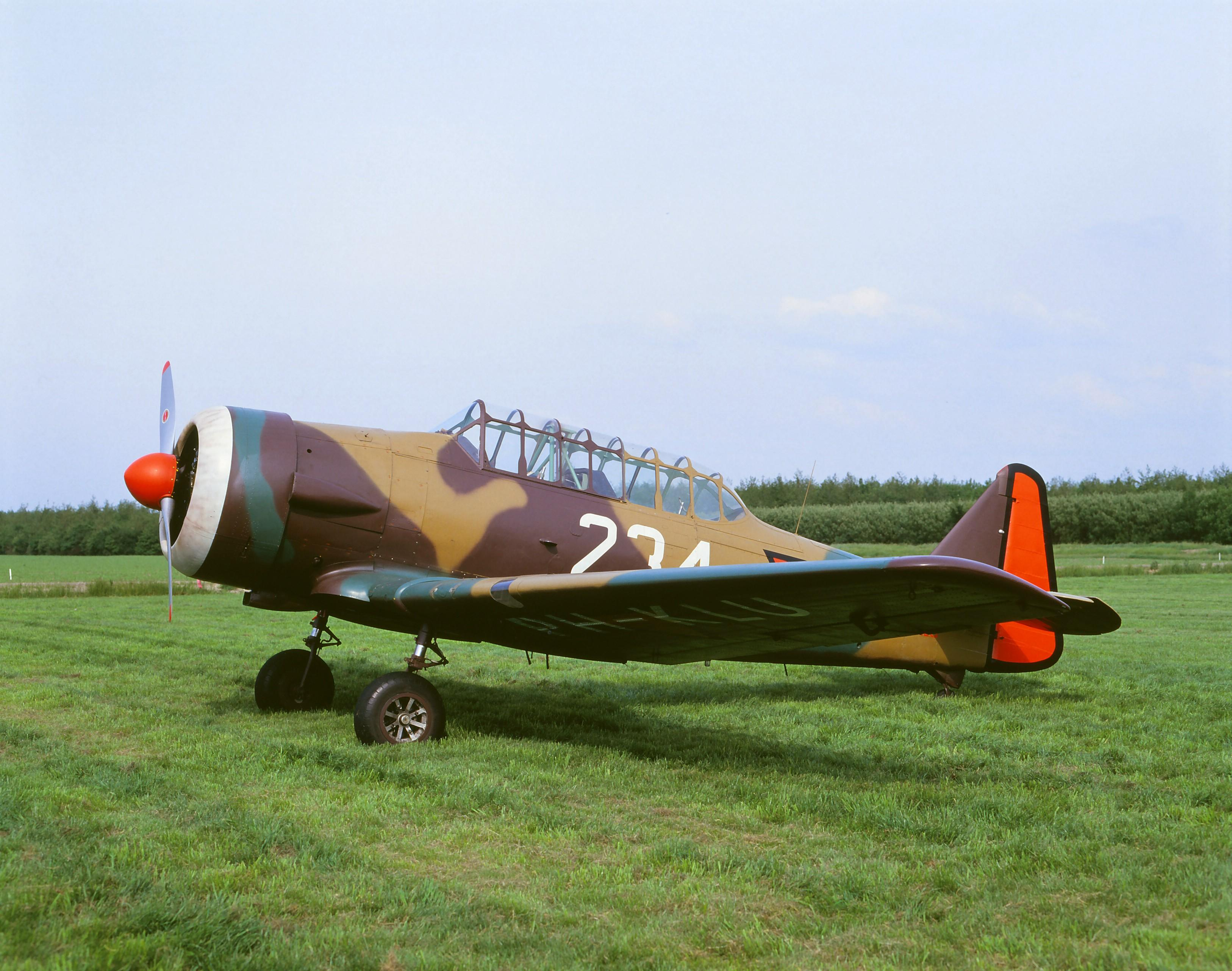
- A Noorduyn built Harvard Mk-II similar to the one involved in the accident
- Type: Harvard Mark II
- Operator: Royal Canadian Air Force
- Occupants: 1
- Crew: 1
- Fatalities: 1
- Survivors: 0

Ground casualties
- Ground fatalities: 1

On April 8, 1954, Trans-Canada Air Lines Flight 9, a Canadair C-4 North Star four-engine commercial propliner on a domestic regular scheduled flight, collided in mid air with a Royal Canadian Air Force (RCAF) Harvard Mark II single engine military trainer on a cross-country navigation exercise over Moose Jaw, Saskatchewan.

Both aircraft crashed, a large section of the C-4 North Star fell on a home in the suburbs of Moose Jaw and the Harvard came down on a golf course. All 35 people in the airliner were killed as was the lone occupant of the trainer and one person on the ground. Investigators later stated the most likely cause of the accident was the failure of both pilots to see and avoid each other.

== Accident ==
Flight 9 departed Winnipeg at 08:58 in clear weather and climbed to a cruising altitude of 6,000 feet. While flying westbound at an airspeed of 189 knots and tracking the Green One airway the C-4 North Star crew reported their position over Regina, Saskatchewan at 09:52. This was the last radio transmission from Flight 9. Thomas Thorrat had taken off at 09:57 in a RCAF single engine trainer on a cross country flight, his ninth solo. After departing RCAF Station Moose Jaw 4.5 miles south of the town, Thorrat set his heading to 022 degrees and began climbing to his target altitude of 9,000 feet at 108 knots.

At 10:02 as the Harvard reached 6,000 feet, it collided with the North Star at a combined speed of 261 knots over the northeastern section of Moose Jaw. The damaged North Star began descending like "a falling leaf" according to one witness. Some passengers were ejected from the airliner and fell amongst debris from the fractured aircraft. Approximately eight seconds after the collision, the C-4 North Star's forward fuselage fell on a home, demolishing it and creating an inferno while killing its single occupant. One of the Rolls-Royce Merlin engines was found in the back yard of the home set on fire, while another came to rest on the town's Main Street.

The majority of the heavily damaged Harvard crashed onto a golf course. The pilot's body was found near the cockpit.

Among the passengers aboard Flight 9 was Agar Rodney Adamson, a member of the House of Commons who died alongside his wife in the collision.

== Aircraft and crews ==
The Canadian built C-4 North Star, a V-12 engine derivative of the Douglas DC-4, carried manufacturer's serial number 150 and had its preliminary test flight on June 16, 1949. Canadian Pacific Airlines took delivery of the propliner on July 11, 1949 where it was named Empress of Hong Kong, registered CF-CPP and issued fleet number 404. Trans-Canada Air Lines purchased it on January 2, 1952, assigned it fleet number 223 and re-registered it CF-TFW. It was crewed by Captain Ian H. Bell, who had 14 years of experience flying for Trans Canada Airlines. Bell was considered a very cautious pilot and had commanded Flight 9 many times. Douglas W. Guthrie was the first officer.

The RCAF Harvard Mk. II, a variant of the North American T-6 Texan, was a World War II era military trainer numbered 3309. It was piloted by Acting Pilot Officer Thomas Andrew Thorrat, 22 years old from Kirkcaldy, Fife, Scotland, a student pilot with 170 total flying hours logged.

== Investigation ==
The RCAF, Trans-Canada Airlines, and the Canadian Board of Transport all launched their own investigations into the accident. After examining all available evidence, they determined the most likely accident sequence: The Harvard struck the North Star with its propeller and starboard wing near the airliner's No.1 engine, rupturing the outboard fuel tank and causing an explosion. Training Cadet Thorrat was probably killed at this time. The Harvard then ploughed into the North Star's fuselage between the wing's trailing edge and the passenger door. The inboard fuel tank in the airliner's left wing then exploded, causing the No.1 engine to detach from its mount while the wing was torn from the aircraft near the root. The Harvard's engine separated from its airframe and entered the passenger seating area, while the remaining bulk of the trainer sliced off the airliner's empennage. The severely damaged airliner continued westbound briefly, then pitched nose down and entered an almost vertical spiraling descent, as passengers and luggage were expelled from the large opening in the rear of the fuselage.

The report completed by the Canadian Board of Transport cited three elements likely contributing to causing the accident. Firstly, both aircrews failed to see and avoid each other. While ascending, the Harvard passed through an airway regularly used by commercial aircraft. Also, there was the possibility that the bright yellow Harvard was not seen by the Northstar's crew due to a window post in their line of sight.

The accident was a catalyst for changes in aviation practices in the airspace near Moose Jaw. The Green One airway was diverted to the north of the town to keep airliners at a safe distance from the RCAF base. A new regulation was implemented requiring aircraft flying in opposite directions to maintain separate altitudes. And RCAF Station Moose Jaw changed its flight rules concerning flight over Moose Jaw, mandating that operation take place south of the town.

== See also ==
- Capital Airlines Flight 300
