= Canadair North Star =

Canadian airliner with 4 piston engines, 1946

North Star
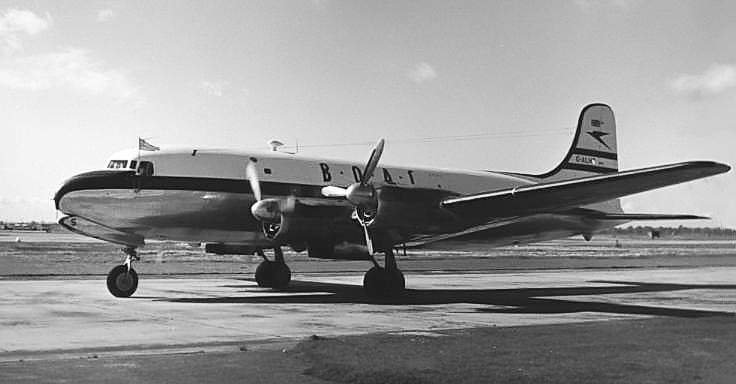
- BOAC DC-4M-4 Argonaut G-ALHS "Astra" at London Airport (Heathrow) in September 1954

General information
- Type: Passenger and cargo transport
- Manufacturer: Canadair
- Primary users: Trans-Canada Air Lines Royal Canadian Air Force; Canadian Pacific Air Lines; BOAC
- Number built: 71

History
- Manufactured: 1946–1950
- Introduction date: 1946
- First flight: 15 July 1946
- Retired: 1960s (RCAF), 1975 (last civil operator)
- Developed from: Douglas DC-4

The Canadair North Star is a 1940s Canadian development, for Trans-Canada Air Lines (TCA), of the Douglas DC-4. Instead of radial piston engines used by the Douglas design, Canadair used Rolls-Royce Merlin V12 engines to achieve a higher cruising speed of 325 mph (523 km/h) compared with the 246 mph (396 km/h) of the standard DC-4. Requested by TCA in 1944, the prototype flew on 15 July 1946. The type was used by various airlines and by the Royal Canadian Air Force (RCAF). It proved to be reliable but noisy when in service through the 1950s and into the 1960s. Some examples continued to fly into the 1970s, converted to cargo aircraft.

== Design and development ==
Canadair Aircraft Ltd. took over the Canadian Vickers Ltd. operations on 11 November 1944. Besides the existing Consolidated PBY Canso flying patrol boats in production, a development contract to produce a new variant of the Douglas DC-4 transport was still in effect. The new Canadair DC-4M powered by Rolls-Royce Merlin engines mounted in Rolls-Royce Universal Power Plant (UPP) installations emerged in 1946 as the "North Star." More than just an engine swap, the North Star had the Douglas DC-6 nose and landing gear and fuselage (shortened by 80 inches (6.7 ft; 2.0 m)); a DC-4 empennage, rear fuselage, flaps and wing tips; C-54 middle fuselage sections, wing centre- and outer-wing panels, cabin pressurisation, and a standardised cockpit layout with a different electrical system.

Canadair built 71 examples of what was officially called the Canadair Four under the designations: North Star, DC-4M, C-4 and C-5. With the exception of the single C-5 (which had Pratt & Whitney R-2800 engines, as fitted to the Douglas DC-6), these variants were all powered by Rolls-Royce Merlin engines and 51 of the production examples were pressurised.

== Operational history ==
Trans-Canada Air Lines (TCA), the Royal Canadian Air Force (RCAF), Canadian Pacific Airlines (CPA) and British Overseas Airways Corporation (BOAC) were the principal operators of the "North Star", with the CPA examples known as the "Canadair Four" and BOAC examples known as the "Argonaut".

=== RCAF service ===
The RCAF North Stars were unpressurized and were used on a variety of transport duties. Like other North Stars, they were notorious for the high level of cabin noise caused by the Merlin engines, as unlike the radials of the DC-4, the exhaust from the individual cylinders is not collected and exhausted via a single outlet, but instead exits the separate individual ejector-exhaust stubs in high-pressure bursts.

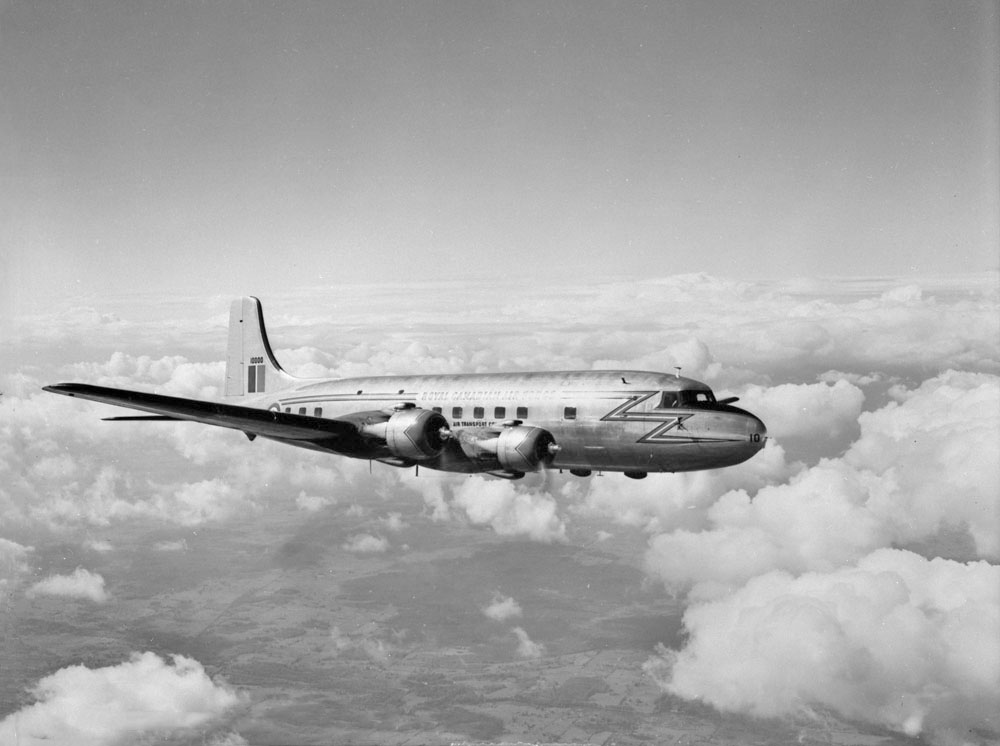
The single RCAF C-5 North Star with Double Wasp radial engines.

In an effort to reduce cabin noise, the sole C-5 variant was powered by Pratt & Whitney R-2800 Double Wasp engines that were considerably quieter. The only C-5 was delivered to the RCAF in 1950, entering service with No. 412 Transport Squadron RCAF in Uplands, Ottawa, specially outfitted for the transportation of VIP passengers. It was used to transport the Canadian Prime Minister, the Queen, and numerous other dignitaries on various high-profile missions, serving faithfully for 17 years, later becoming a crew trainer before being retired and sold in the United States.

North Stars were also employed by 412 Squadron RCAF on various VIP transport duties and, overall, the aircraft provided valuable and reliable long range transport services for the RCAF. From 1950 to 1952, during the Korean War, RCAF North Star aircraft were employed ferrying supplies to Korea across the Pacific Ocean. They flew 599 round trips over the Pacific and delivered seven million pounds of cargo and 13,000 personnel on return trips. They flew 1.9 million miles without a fatal crash. After 1967, the remaining North Stars were assigned to No. 426 Transport Squadron RCAF initially deployed to Dorval, Quebec and then to Trenton, Ontario. Gradually, their service life diminished in the 1970s and most were declared surplus.

=== TCA and BOAC operations ===
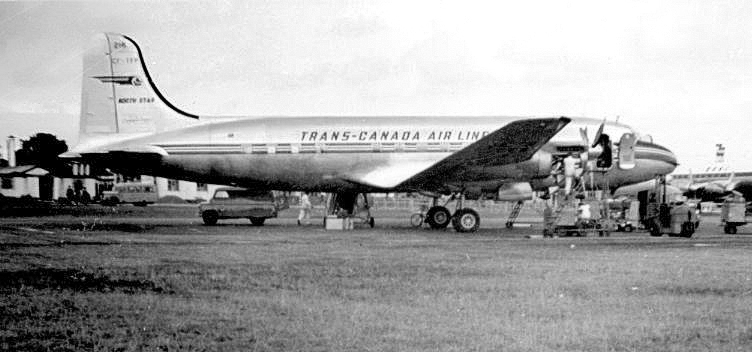
TCA North Star at London Airport (Heathrow) in 1951

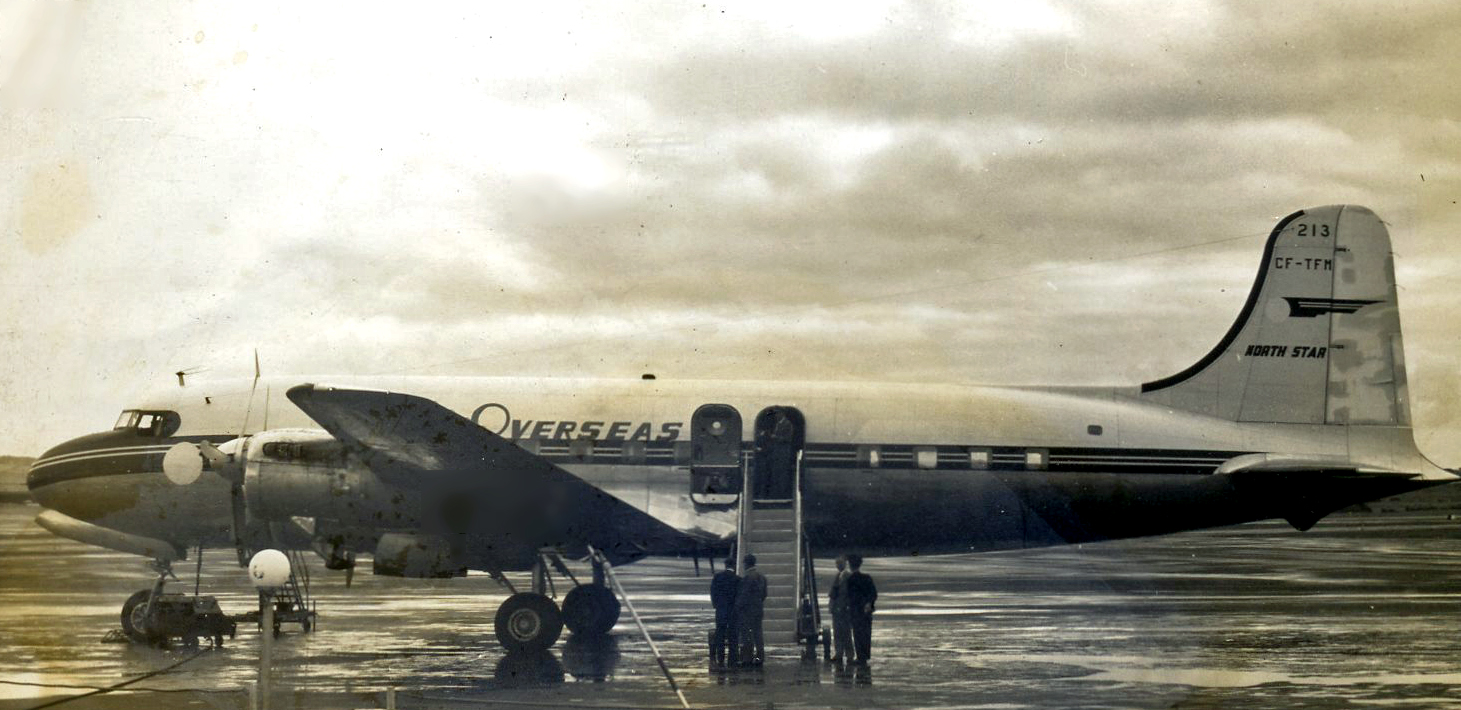
An ex TCA DC-4M-2 North Star of Overseas Aviation at Prestwick in 1960

TCA received its fleet of twenty DC-4M-2 North Stars during 1947 and 1948 and operated them on routes within Canada and to the USA until 1961. Starting in 1954 the North Stars were replaced on TCA's routes to Europe by Lockheed Super Constellations. To deal with passenger complaints about noise, TCA engineers developed a cross-over for the fuselage-side exhausts that reduced cabin noise by 6-8 decibels. "In the cabin, noise is reduced to 102 decibels near the windows and 93 at the aisle."

BOAC ordered 22 DC-4M-4s and named them the "Argonaut class", each aircraft having a classical name beginning with "A". The Argonauts were delivered between March and November 1949; they flew to South America, Africa, the Middle East and the Far East from London Heathrow Airport until 1960.

On 1 February 1952 the BOAC Argonaut Atalanta G-ALHK transported Princess Elizabeth and the Duke of Edinburgh to Kenya to begin a Commonwealth tour. Some days later, 6 February, it was again Atalanta G-ALHK which returned the newly acceded Queen Elizabeth II to England upon the death of her father, King George VI.

Rolls-Royce also developed a quieter 'cross-over' exhaust system for the DC-4M, the modifications being supplied in a kit allowing installation on the aircraft by the operator. The engine thus modified became the 'Merlin TMO' in contrast to the unmodified engine, the Merlin TML - Transport Merlin L. The modified exhaust conferred an increase in horsepower over the unmodified system of 38 hp, resulting in a 5 knot improvement in true air speed. Sound levels were reduced by between 5 and 8 decibels. Still air range of the aircraft was also improved by around 4 per cent. BOAC Argonauts initially, due to schedules being unable to be changed, had only the inner engines so-modified, the remaining outer engines being changed to the new exhaust system when time was available.

=== Later service ===
After service with TCA and BOAC, the surplused North Stars and Argonauts had long careers with secondary operators such as British Midland Airways, Overseas Aviation and other charter companies. Cargo conversions of available airframes also lengthened the service life of Argonauts and North Stars.CF-UXA, ex-RCAF 17510 was the last DC-4M in airline service, completing its final flight on 19 June 1975 at Miami, Florida. Despite the onset of jet airliners in the 1950s, the rugged Canadair North Star found a niche in both military and civil use.

== Variants ==
Canadair built 71 examples under the designations: North Star, DC-4M, C-4 and C-5. With the exception of the single C-5 (which had Pratt & Whitney R-2800 engines, as fitted to the Douglas DC-6), these variants were all powered by Rolls-Royce Merlin engines and 51 of the production examples were pressurised.

DC-4M-1 North Star
Initial variant as designed for Trans Canada Airlines (TCA); at least 5 built for TCA.
DC-4M-2 North Star
Pressurised higher take-off weight version.
C-4 Argonaut
22 built for use by BOAC.
C-5 North Star
One RCAF VIP transport version powered by four Pratt & Whitney R-2800 radial piston engines.
CL-29
1949 maritime patrol aircraft proposal made in anticipation of RCAF requirements, with a stretched fuselage and re-engined with three engine options. Eventual 1952 RCAF specifications were for a much more capable aircraft though and the Bristol Britannia would be used as the basis instead.

== Accidents and incidents ==
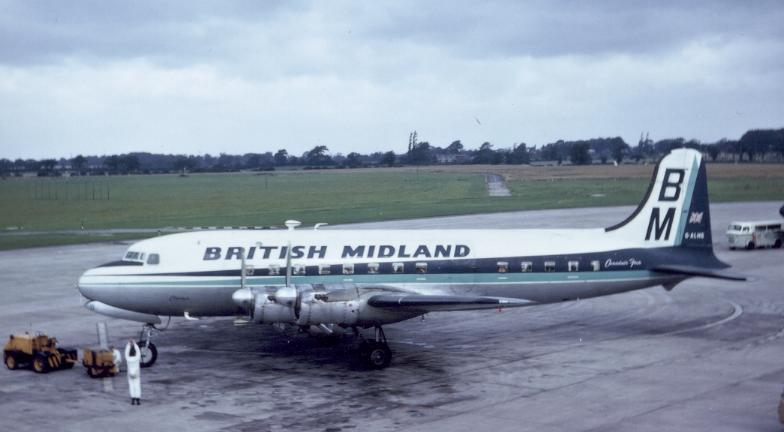
Canadair C-4 Argonaut G-ALHG at Manchester Airport on 29 August 1965

On 8 April 1954, a Royal Canadian Air Force Canadian Car and Foundry Harvard Mk.II 3309 collided with Trans-Canada Airlines North Star CF-TFW over Moose Jaw, Saskatchewan, killing 36 people aboard the aircraft and one person on the ground. As a result of this crash, training flights are restricted south of the Trans Canada Highway and civil aviation transit north of the highway.

On 21 September 1955, BOAC Argonaut G-ALHL which was traveling from Rome to Tripoli crashed on its fourth landing attempt in poor visibility and strong winds. Fifteen of the 40 occupants died when the aircraft descended too low, struck trees approximately 1,200 ft short of runway 11 and subsequently impacted terrain.

On 24 June 1956, BOAC Argonaut G-ALHE crashed shortly after taking off from Kano Airport, Nigeria into a thunderstorm, killing 29 of the 38 passengers and three of the seven crew members.

On 9 December 1956, Trans-Canada Air Lines Flight 810 crashed into Mount Slesse on a flight from Vancouver to Calgary, killing all 62 people on board the aircraft. Among the dead were five Canadian Football League players, including four members of the Saskatchewan Roughriders and one member of the Winnipeg Blue Bombers, as well as a CFL official returning home from the previous day's annual All-Star game at Empire Stadium in Vancouver.

On 11 October 1966, CF-TFM/HP925 crashed near Garoua, Cameroons, carrying spurious registration I-ACOA, believed to be carrying a cargo of machine guns bound for Burundi. Ex-Overseas Aviation, bought at Gatwick by Mike Keegan, it had been ferried to Coventry for onward sale; under new ownership, flown to Newcastle (UK), with a subsequent long-term stay parked adjacent to the wooden control tower and subject to a restraining Court Order. Eventually re-registered in Panamanian markings, it was flown to Limburg, Netherlands, but ended up being involved in various arms shipment flights to West Africa. After the accident, the movements of this aircraft were investigated and extensively reported by, it is thought, the Sunday Times newspaper. Re-registration history and movements after leaving NCL courtesy of Propliner magazine's website.

On 4 June 1967, Argonaut G-ALHG, owned by British Midland Airways, crashed near the centre of Stockport, Greater Manchester, United Kingdom. Fatalities included 72 of the 84 on board; 12 others were seriously injured.

== Surviving aircraft ==
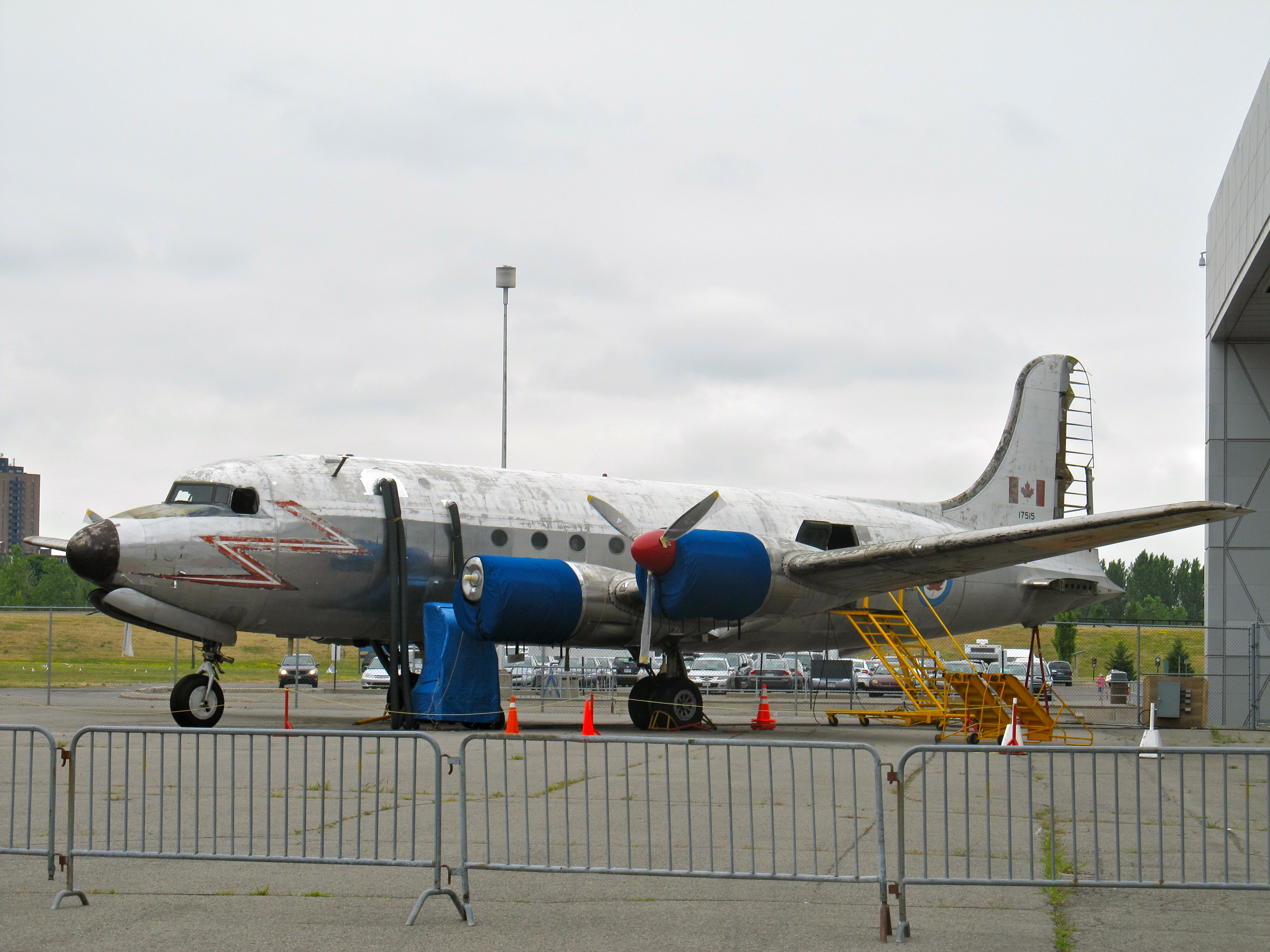
RCAF C-54GM example (17515 ) at the Canada Aviation and Space Museum

The sole surviving airframe is an RCAF C-54GM example (17515 ), which is currently undergoing restoration at the Canada Aviation and Space Museum, Ottawa, Ontario.

The nose section of (17522 ) resides at the Reynolds Museum in Alberta.

== Specifications (C-4) ==
Data from Jane's All the World's Aircraft 1951–52 & McDonnell Douglas Aircraft Since 1920: Volume I

General characteristics

- Crew: 7
- Capacity: 55 passengers
- Length: 93 ft 7 1/2 in (28.54 m)
- Wingspan: 117 ft 6 in (35.81 m)
- Height: 27 ft 6 5/16 in (8.39 m)
- Wing area: 1,457 sq ft (135.4 m^{2})
- Aspect ratio: 9.48:1
- Airfoil: NACA 23016/23012
- Empty weight: 46,832 lb (21,243 kg)
- Max takeoff weight: 82,300 lb (37,331 kg)
- Fuel capacity: 3,226 imp gal (3,874 US gal; 14,670 L)
- Powerplant: 4 × Rolls-Royce Merlin 626 liquid-cooled V-12 engines
  - 1,760 hp (1,310 kW) takeoff rating
  - 1,470 hp (1,100 kW) normal rating at 18,700 ft (5,700 m)
- Propellers: 3-bladed Hamilton Standard constant-speed propellers, 13 ft 1 in (3.99 m) diameter

Performance

- Cruise speed: 325 mph (523 km/h, 282 kn) at 80,200 lb (36,400 kg) gross weight at 25,200 ft (7,700 m)
  302 mph (262 kn; 486 km/h) at 82,300 lb (37,300 kg) gross weight at 25,200 ft (7,700 m)
- Range: 3,860 mi (6,210 km, 3,350 nmi) (absolute range)
- Service ceiling: 29,500 ft (9,000 m)
- Rate of climb: 840 ft/min (4.3 m/s)

== See also ==
Related development

- Aviation Traders Carvair
- Douglas C-54 Skymaster
- Douglas DC-4
- Douglas DC-6
- Douglas DC-7

Aircraft of comparable role, configuration, and era

- Avro Tudor
- Avro York
- Boeing 307 Stratoliner

Related lists

- List of aircraft
- List of civil aircraft
