= Vickers Viscount =

British four-engined medium-range turboprop airliner, 1948

Viscount
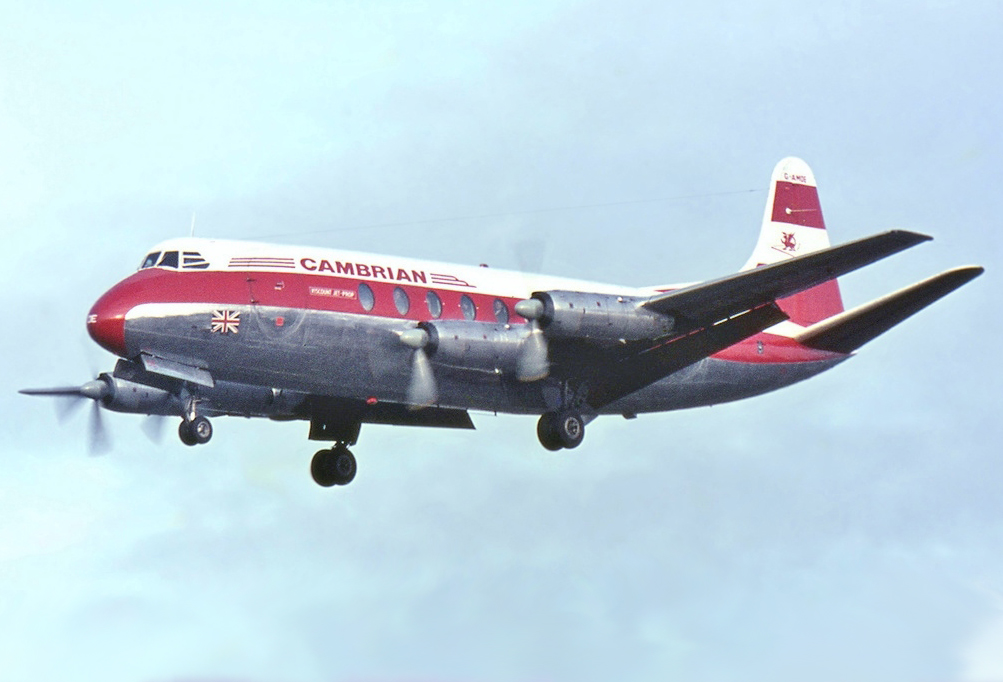
- Cambrian Airways Vickers Viscount

General information
- Type: Turboprop airliner
- National origin: United Kingdom
- Manufacturer: Vickers-Armstrongs
- Status: Retired
- Primary users: British European Airways Capital Airlines; Trans-Canada Air Lines; Air Canada
- Number built: 445

History
- Manufactured: 1948–1963
- Introduction date: 18 April 1953 with British European Airways
- First flight: 16 July 1948
- Retired: January 2009
- Developed into: Vickers Vanguard

The Vickers Viscount is a retired British medium-range turboprop airliner first flown in 1948 by Vickers-Armstrongs. A design requirement from the Brabazon Committee, it entered service in 1953 and was the first turboprop-powered airliner.

The Viscount was well received by the public for its cabin conditions, which included pressurisation, reductions in vibration and noise, and panoramic windows. It became one of the most successful and profitable of the first postwar transport aircraft; 445 Viscounts were built for a range of international customers, including in North America.

== Development ==
=== Origins ===
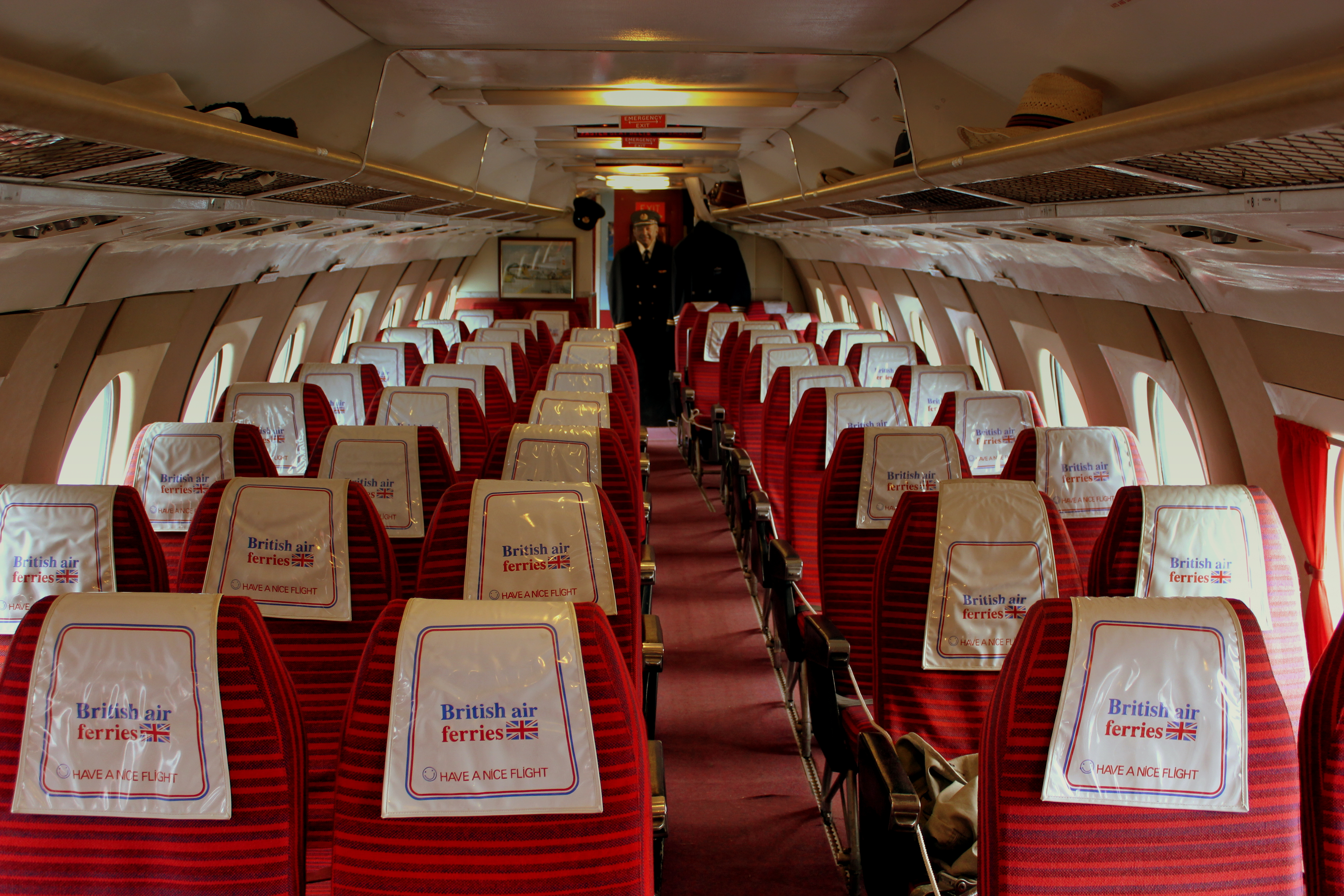
Five-abreast cabin

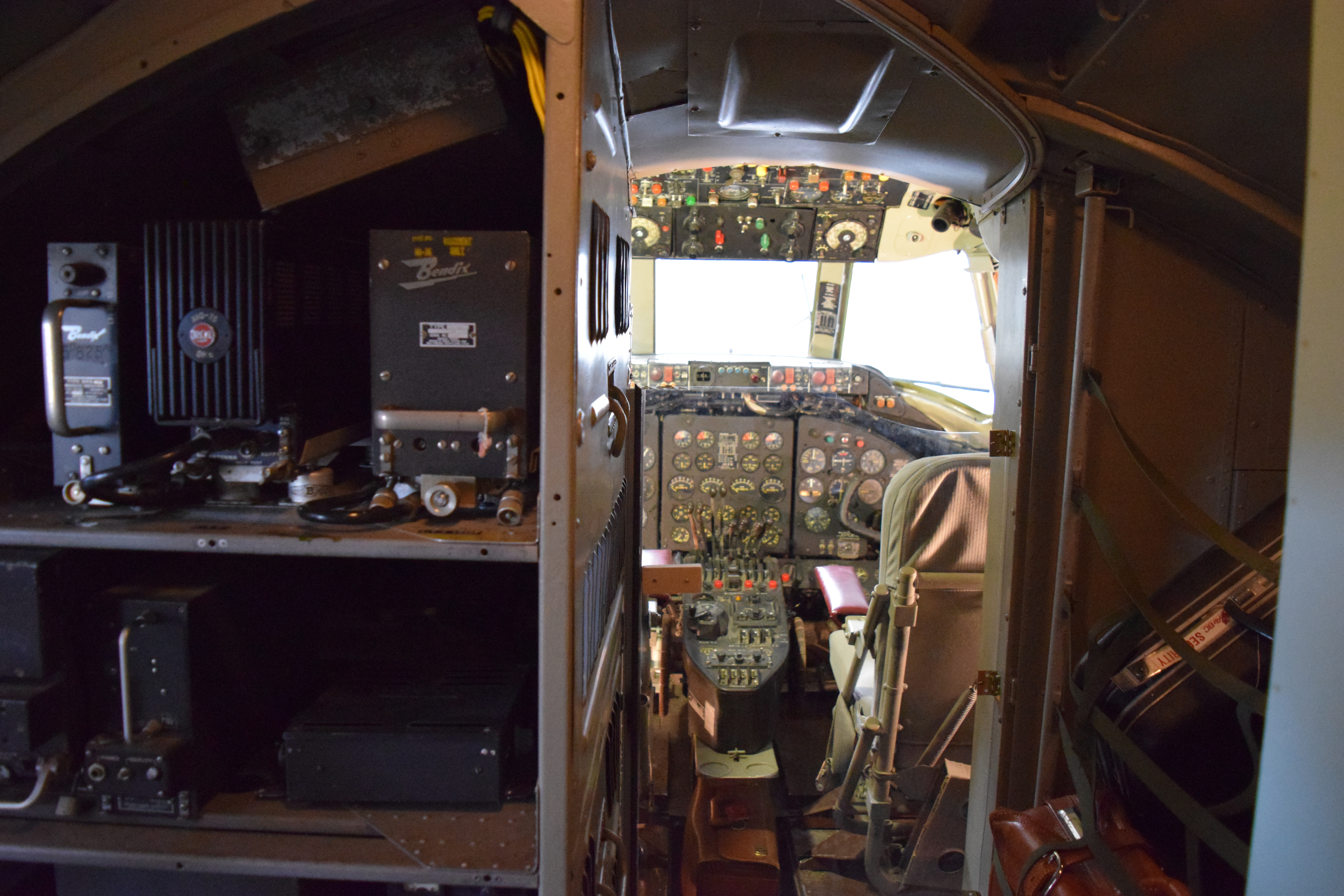
Front cabin

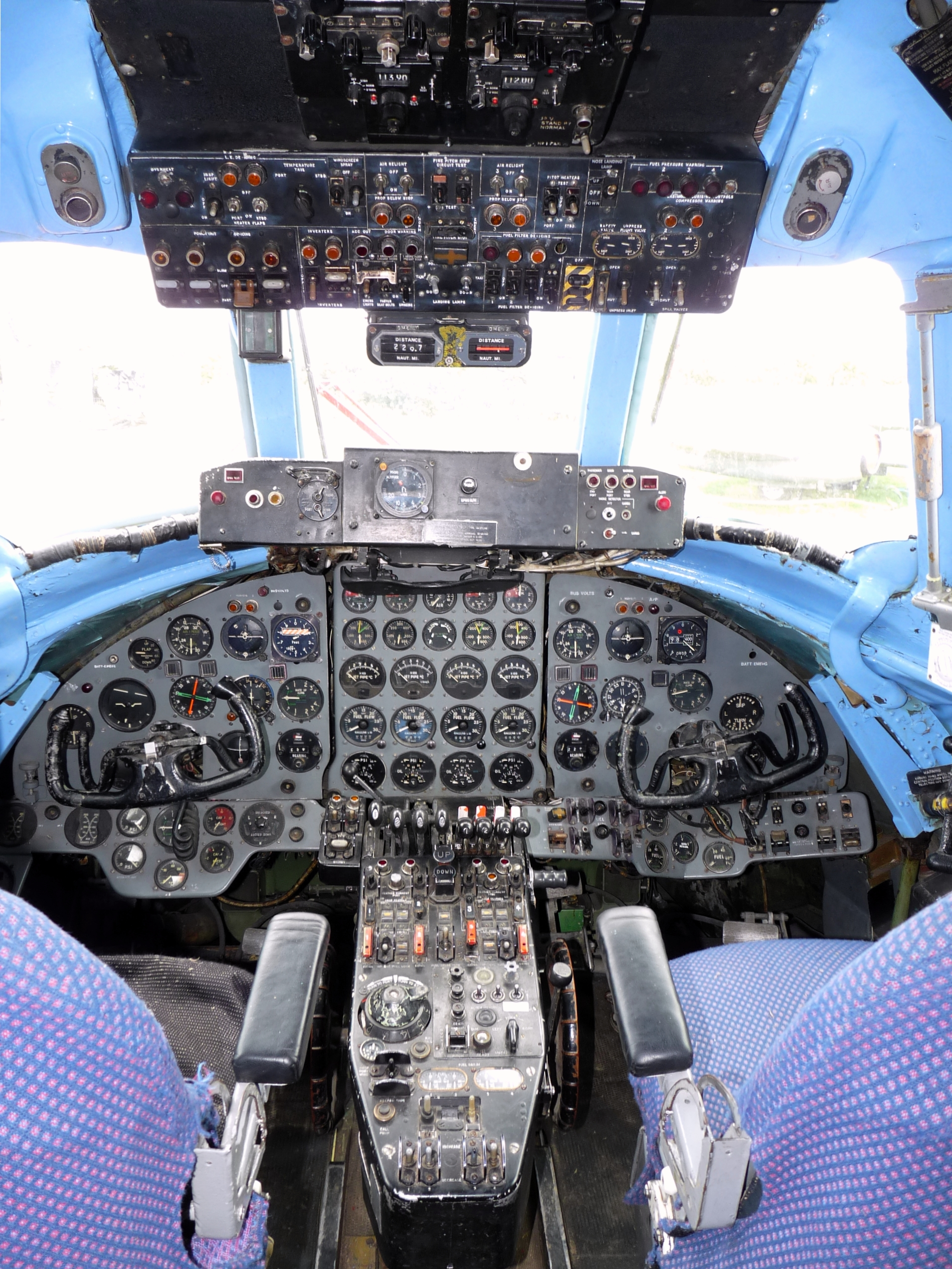
Cockpit

The Viscount was a response to the 1943 Brabazon Committee's proposed Type II design for a postwar, small, medium-range, pressurised aircraft to fly less-travelled routes, carrying 24 passengers up to 1,750 mi (2,816 km) at 200 mph (320 km/h). During discussions between the committee and Vickers' chief designer, Rex Pierson, Vickers advocated turboprop power. The committee was not convinced and split the specification into two types, the Type IIA using piston power, which led to the Airspeed Ambassador, and the turboprop-powered Type IIB, which Vickers was selected to develop in April 1945. British European Airways (BEA) was involved in the design and asked that the aircraft carry 32 passengers, instead, but remained otherwise similar.

The first design in June 1945 was based on the Viking with four turboprop engines and 24 seats and designated the VC-2 or Type 453. Later, a double-bubble fuselage was proposed to give extra underfloor cargo space. Neither was pressurised, but the designers soon realised that for economical operation, an altitude above 20,000 ft (6,100 m) was needed. Thus, pressurisation was required. The decision for pressurisation resulted in the double-bubble and elliptical fuselage designs being abandoned. A circular cross-section variant was offered at the beginning of 1946. The resulting 28-seat VC-2 was financed by the Ministry of Supply with an order for two prototypes. Before the contract was signed, though, the government asked for the capacity to be increased to 32. This stretched the fuselage from 65 ft 5 in (19.94 m) to 74 ft 6 in (22.71 m) and meant an increased wingspan of 89 ft (27 m). (Note: The wings and fuselage of the Viscount were similar to the earlier Viking; however no components were shared.)

The contract for the aircraft to Air Ministry specification C.16/46 was signed on 9 March 1946 and Vickers allocated the designation Type 609 and the name Viceroy. Although Vickers' Experimental Department Manager George Edwards had always favoured the 800 hp Rolls-Royce Dart other engines were considered, including the Armstrong Siddeley Mamba, which the government specified for the two prototypes. The choice of the Mamba engine increased the weight, but Vickers made sure the engine nacelle would fit either the Mamba or Dart. While the Dart progressed better in development, the government asked in August 1947 for the second prototype to be Dart-powered. The second prototype was designated the 630 and was named as the Viscount. The first prototype already under construction was converted to the Dart as a 630, as well.

The resulting Vickers Type 630 design was completed at Brooklands by chief designer Rex Pierson and his staff in 1945, a 32-seat airliner powered by four Dart engines for a cruising speed of 275 mph (443 km/h). An order for two prototypes was placed in March 1946, and construction started in the company's Foxwarren Experimental Department. Originally named Viceroy after the viceroy of India, Lord Louis Mountbatten, the aircraft was renamed Viscount following India's independence in 1947. Work took place on replacing the Darts with the Mamba, but this was dropped by the time the prototypes were reaching completion. After Pierson's death in 1948, George Edwards (later Sir George Edwards) took over as chief designer and assumed all technical control over the Viscount project.

=== Prototypes ===
Never having flown other than piston-engined aircraft I was tremendously impressed with the smoothness of the four Dart turboprop engines. As I sat in the cabin, a coin was balanced on its edge on the table...

— Test Pilot Joseph Summers, commenting on flight characteristics of the Viscount.

The prototype Type 630, registered G-AHRF, made its maiden flight from the grass airfield at Wisley on 16 July 1948, piloted by Joseph "Mutt" Summers, Vickers' chief test pilot. The design was considered too small and slow at 275 mph (443 km/h), making the per-passenger operating costs too high for regular service, and BEA had placed an order for 20 piston-engined Airspeed Ambassadors in 1947. Retrospectively commenting on Britain's aviation industry, Duncan Burn stated: "Had BEA committed itself to full support of the Viscount... it was quite likely that the smaller version would have gone into production... It was in a sense BEA's lack of enthusiasm for the [Type] 630 which made possible the [Viscount's] success."

Early flight trials, however, showed the qualities of a turboprop, resulting in a February 1949 order from the Ministry of Supply for a prototype of a stretched version with more powerful engines, the Type 700. Meanwhile, the first prototype Type 630 was awarded a restricted Certificate of Airworthiness on 15 September 1949, followed by a full certificate on 27 July 1950, which allowed the aircraft to be placed into trial service with BEA on 29 July to familiarise the pilots and ground crew with the new aircraft. It flew scheduled flights between London and Paris, and London and Edinburgh until 23 August 1950. The 29 July 1950 flight between Northolt and Paris – Le Bourget Airport with 14 paying passengers was the first scheduled airline flight by any turbine-powered aircraft.

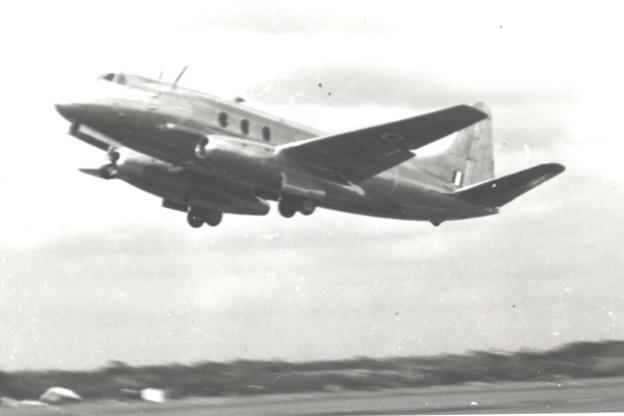
Type 663 Tay Viscount demonstrating at Farnborough in September 1950

The second prototype Viscount, the Type 663 testbed, had two Rolls-Royce Tay turbojet engines, and first flew in RAF markings as serial VX217 at Wisley on 15 March 1950. It was demonstrated at the Farnborough SBAC Show in September and was later used in the development of powered controls for the Valiant bomber. It later was used as a test bed by Boulton Paul Ltd for the development of electronic flight-control systems.

The designers then went back to the drawing board and the aircraft emerged as the larger Type 700 with up to 48 passengers (53 in some configurations), and a cruising speed of 308 mph (496 km/h). The new prototype G-AMAV first flew from Brooklands on 28 August 1950, and served as a development aircraft for the type for several years. In late August 1950, BEA placed an order for 20 aircraft; further orders came in the following year from operators such as Air France, Aer Lingus, and Misrair. In 1953, the basic cost given for a Viscount was £235,000.

=== Performance and changes ===
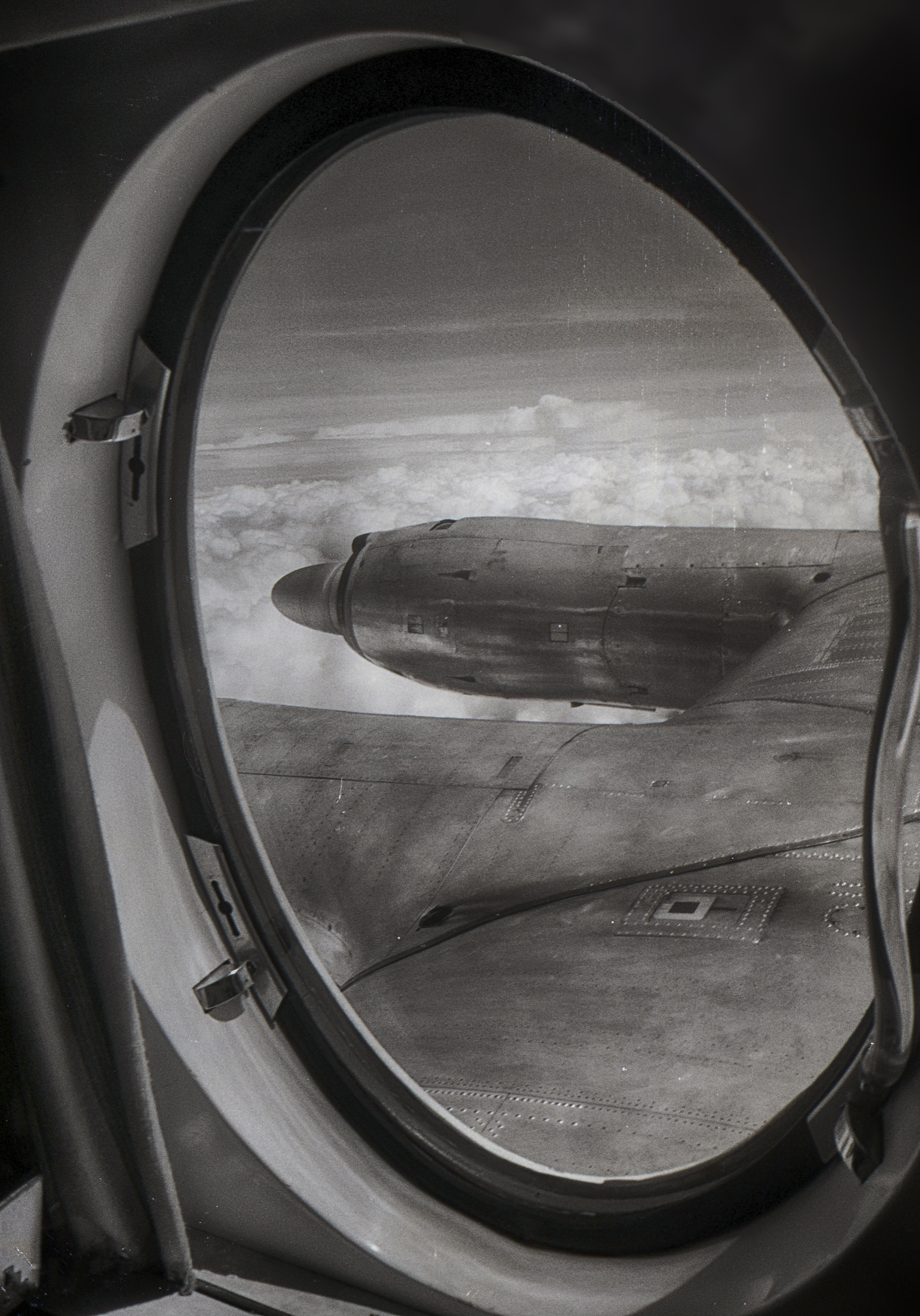
The Viscount's large oval windows, Air Zimbabwe 1981

One reporter, after travelling on an Air France Viscount, wrote in 1953: "Noise level was less than that of piston engines. It was a definite relief to be rid of the rough vibrations... The turboprop is an excellent shorthaul airplane and a definite crowd pleaser. The substitution of a lower constant-pitch noise and smoothness for the vibration, grunts, and groans of the piston engine gives the hesitant passenger a feeling of confidence." Viscount cabin windows were huge ellipses, 19 by 26 inches. (Note: Elliptical windows required the least weight of structural reinforcement in a pressurised fuselage.) Viscount operational costs were lower than many rival aircraft; Vickers projected a 700 could carry a 13,000-lb payload from Chicago to New York in 2 hours 45 minutes against a 10-mph headwind, burning 6395 lb of fuel.

In the field of intercity transports employing the propeller turbine, the Vickers Viscount Model 700 appears to be considerably superior to anything else in its class. [It has] exceptionally fine flying qualities and is a most comfortable vehicle in which to travel.

— John Watkins, Chief Technical Officer of Trans Australia Airlines.

All production Viscounts were powered by the Rolls-Royce Dart turboprop; from its initial 800 hp, and then 1,000 hp and higher, Rolls-Royce extensively developed the Dart engine, due to its popularity and use on the Viscount and several later aircraft. (Note: Other aircraft powered by the Rolls-Royce Dart engine include the Fokker F27 Friendship, Hawker Siddeley HS 748, Grumman Gulfstream I, Handley Page Herald, Armstrong Whitworth AW.660 Argosy, and NAMC YS-11.) One key model was the Dart 506 engine, with better fuel efficiency than earlier models, allowing airline Viscounts to fly longer routes, with more payload. With the availability of more powerful engines, Vickers continued to develop the Viscount's design. (Note: During the 1960s, the occurrence of metal fatigue in the Viscount's wing spar led to Vickers implementing tighter restrictions on the lifespan of the spars. To gauge the progress of fatigue and for added safety, electromechanical strain range counters were retrofitted on some aircraft.) Later models could carry more passengers and had fewer load limitations.

Three basic versions of the Viscount were built. The first production version was the Type 700 powered by R.Da.3 Dart 505 and later R.Da.3 Dart 506s. A subvariant was the type 700Ds powered by R.D.a Dart 510s.

The second version was the Type 800, which was shorter in range and had a higher passenger capacity aircraft than the 700. The fuselage was lengthened 3 ft 10 in (1.17 m) and the rear pressure bulkhead was moved aft 5 ft 5 in (1.65 m), allowing more passengers to be carried. The 800s (excepting the 806s) were powered by the Dart 510.

The third type of Viscount was the 810. It was the same size as the 800s, but was powered with R.Da. 7/1 Mk 225 or Mk 530 Darts. With the greater power, the 810 was faster and longer ranged than the 800.

Proposed type 740, 850, and 870 Viscounts never left the drawing board.

The Viscount's good performance and popularity with customers encouraged Vickers to privately finance and develop an enlarged and re-engined variant of the Viscount, later designated as the Vickers Vanguard. The Vanguard drew extensively from the knowledge and design of the Viscount, and maintained its advantage of lower operating costs over jet airliners, but its disadvantage in being slower became critical as jets became more available.

British businessman Alistair McAlpine (1942–2014) recalled in his 2002 memoir Adventures Of A Collector an experience on the plane in his youth:

I recall the amazement of my family when the steward on board a Viscount belonging to British European Airways explained to us that the plane was so stable that you could stand a half-crown on its edge – minutes later the aircraft hit an air pocket and coffee cups were thrown up to the ceiling and showered down their contents on all the passengers.

== Operational history ==
Regular passenger flights were launched by BEA on 18 April 1953, the world's first scheduled turboprop airline service. BEA became a large user of the Viscount; by mid-1958, BEA's Viscount fleet had carried over 2.75 million passengers over 200,000 flight hours. Following BEA's launch of the type, multiple independent charter operators, such as British Eagle, were quick to adopt the Viscount into their fleets. During the 1960s, the Viscount formed the backbone of domestic air travel in Scotland.

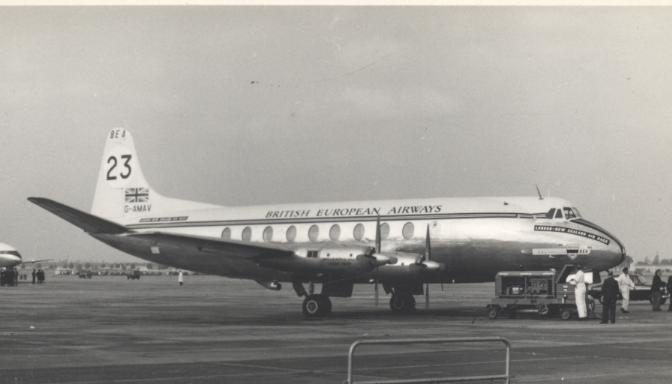
Viscount 700 prototype G-AMAV as competitor No. 23 in the NZ Air Race at London Airport, 8 October 1953

The early operational service of the Viscount quickly proved it to have significant performance advances over its rivals, and orders rapidly rose as a result; up to November 1952, only 42 aircraft had been ordered; by the end of 1953, the order book had risen to 90, and 160 by the end of the following year. (Note: Out of the Viscount's total production, 80 percent of aircraft were produced for export customers.) Vickers was able to quickly respond to the new orders, as it had gambled on such orders emerging and early on the decision had been taken to commit to a high production rate at the company's own risk. In 1957, the Vickers production line was producing the Viscount at a rate of one aircraft every three days.

In October 1953, the Viscount 700 prototype G-AMAV achieved the fastest time (40 hours 41 minutes flying time) in the transport section of the 12,367 mi (19,903 km) air race from London to Christchurch, New Zealand. The aircraft averaged 320 mph (520 km/h) in the event, crossing the finish line nine hours ahead of its closest rival, a Douglas DC-6A of KLM, with the latter winning on handicap. En route, equipped with extra fuel tanks, it flew 3,530 mi (5,680 km) nonstop from the Cocos (Keeling) Islands to Melbourne's Essendon Airport in 10 hours 16 minutes (343.8 mph).

Trans Australia Airlines (TAA) received its first Viscount in 1954, and the aircraft quickly proved profitable, leading to additional orders. The Viscount proved to be an invaluable aircraft for TAA, aviation author John Gunn stating, "TAA had achieved dominance on Australia's trunk routes with its turboprop Viscounts". TAA procured over a dozen Viscounts, and purchased later turboprop aircraft such as the Fokker F27 Friendship; (Note: The Fokker Friendship was powered by the same Rolls-Royce Dart engine as the Viscount. TAA had initially approached Vickers with a desire for a smaller, twin-engined aircraft to accompany the larger Viscount, but Vickers dismissed the idea of developing such an aircraft.) It later transitioned to jet aircraft as passenger demand outgrew the capacity of the Viscounts. To compete with its rival TAA, another Australian airline, Ansett-ANA also procured its own small Viscount fleet; the Viscount allowed Ansett to set out a faster and superior service than the larger TAA for the first time. The Two Airlines Policy was formally established in 1952 by the Fifth Menzies Ministry. The policy took practical effect when Ansett purchased the failing Australian National Airways in 1957, resulting in it being the only competitor for the government-owned TAA. Unstated was the requirement for both airlines to have identical equipment.

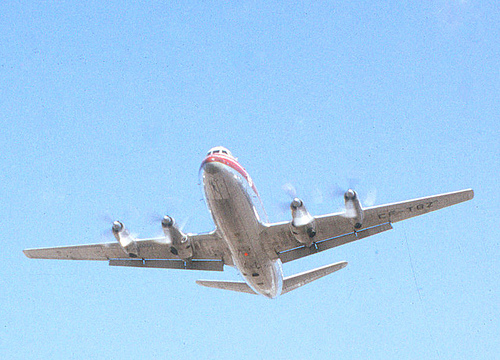
Trans-Canada Airlines Viscount making a low pass sometime in the 1960s

The first North American airline to use turboprop aircraft was Trans-Canada Air Lines (TCA), with a small fleet of Type 700 Viscounts. Initially, TCA was cautious of the Viscount due to the turboprop engine being a new technology, and a preference had existed for acquiring the piston-engined Convair CV-240, instead; praise of the Viscount from pilots and a promise from Vickers to make any design changes desired by TCA persuaded it to procure the Viscount, instead. (Note: In meeting the requirements of United States market, Vickers developed an "Americanised" version of the Viscount; this later acted as the basis for most of the export models sold. Many localised avionics systems were often fitted, such as American-sourced radios on Viscounts bound for service with US operators.) On 6 December 1954, the first Viscount was delivered to Canada in a large media event that included an improvised aerial display.

TCA became a prolific operator of the type, placing multiple follow-up orders for additional Viscounts. By 1958, TCA had an operational fleet of 51 Viscounts. Aviation author Peter Pigott later wrote: "For TCA and Vickers, the Viscount was a public-relations coup. Passengers loved the quiet ride and panoramic windows. No other airline in North America flew turbo-prop airliners then, and no other British aircraft was bought by American airlines in such quantity." TCA operated the Viscount for two decades until Air Canada (TCA relabelled with a name equally at home in English and French), ended Viscount services in 1974. The type was replaced by the McDonnell Douglas DC-9.Routine Flight (1955) featured the TCA introduction of the Viscount in this National Film Board of Canada documentary.

TCA's procurement of the Viscount generated considerable interest from airlines and industry figures across the United States, including American aviation pioneer Howard Hughes, who purchased 15 Viscounts immediately after personally flying one. US Capital Airlines became an important operator of the Type 700 Viscount, (Note: Adaptions on Capital Airline's Viscounts include the addition of weather radar and a built-in airstair.) using it heavily throughout the eastern US routes; in 1958, Capital reportedly had accumulated over 350,000 flight hours on its Viscounts, more than any other operator. Continental Airlines, Northeast Airlines and United Airlines.

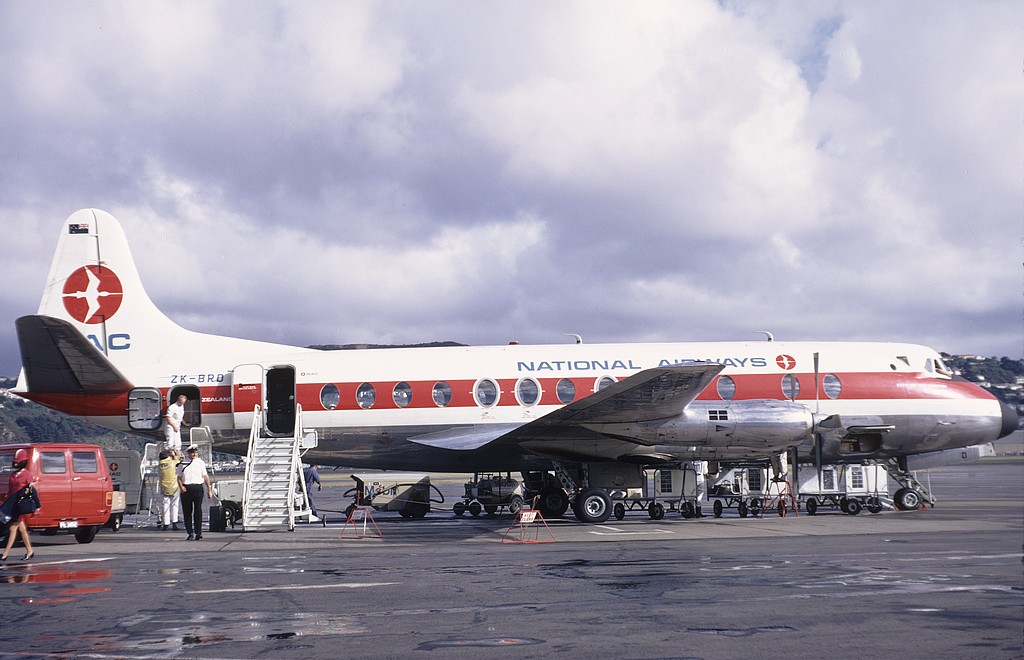
National Airways Viscount at Wellington Airport, 1971

The first airline in Latin America to operate the Viscount was Cubana de Aviación. Cubana's −755D Viscounts, delivered in 1956, were placed on the Havana-Miami and Varadero-Miami routes, and were successful at raising Cubana's market share on these routes. During the 1958 Cuban elections, a Cubana Viscount was hijacked by gunmen aligned with the 26th of July Movement; the aircraft crash-landed in the sea, reportedly killing 17 of the 20 occupants. When the US government imposed its embargo on Cuba in 1962, Cubana decided to sell all of its Viscounts. They were replaced by Soviet-built turboprop aircraft.

South African Airways (SAA) was another major operator of the Viscount; by January 1959, it was operating on all of SAA's domestic routes. In 1961, SAA had seven Viscounts, and acquired a further aircraft from Cuba in the following year. (Note: South Africa Airways had intended to procure more than one Viscount from Cuba; arrangements proposed included an exchange for a pair of Lockheed Constellations, but this did not happen.) In 1965, SAA began receiving Boeing 727s, which had been selected the previous year as a jet-powered replacement for the Viscount. SAA sold its last Viscount to British Midland in the 1970s.

Central African Airways (CAA) had been a traditional customer of Vickers, already operating a number of Vickers Vikings when it received its first Viscount on 25 April 1956. The introduction of the Viscount roughly coincided with the opening of a major airport at Salisbury, and the Viscount became the mainstay of the route between Johannesburg in South Africa, Salisbury (now renamed Harare) in modern-day Zimbabwe, and London, England. CAA had enough Viscounts to entirely replace its Viking fleet and to occasionally lease them to other operators. More Viscounts were purchased by CAA right up until 1965, when CAA announced its intention to procure the British Aircraft Corporation's jet-powered BAC 1-11 successor as the long-term successor to the Viscount.

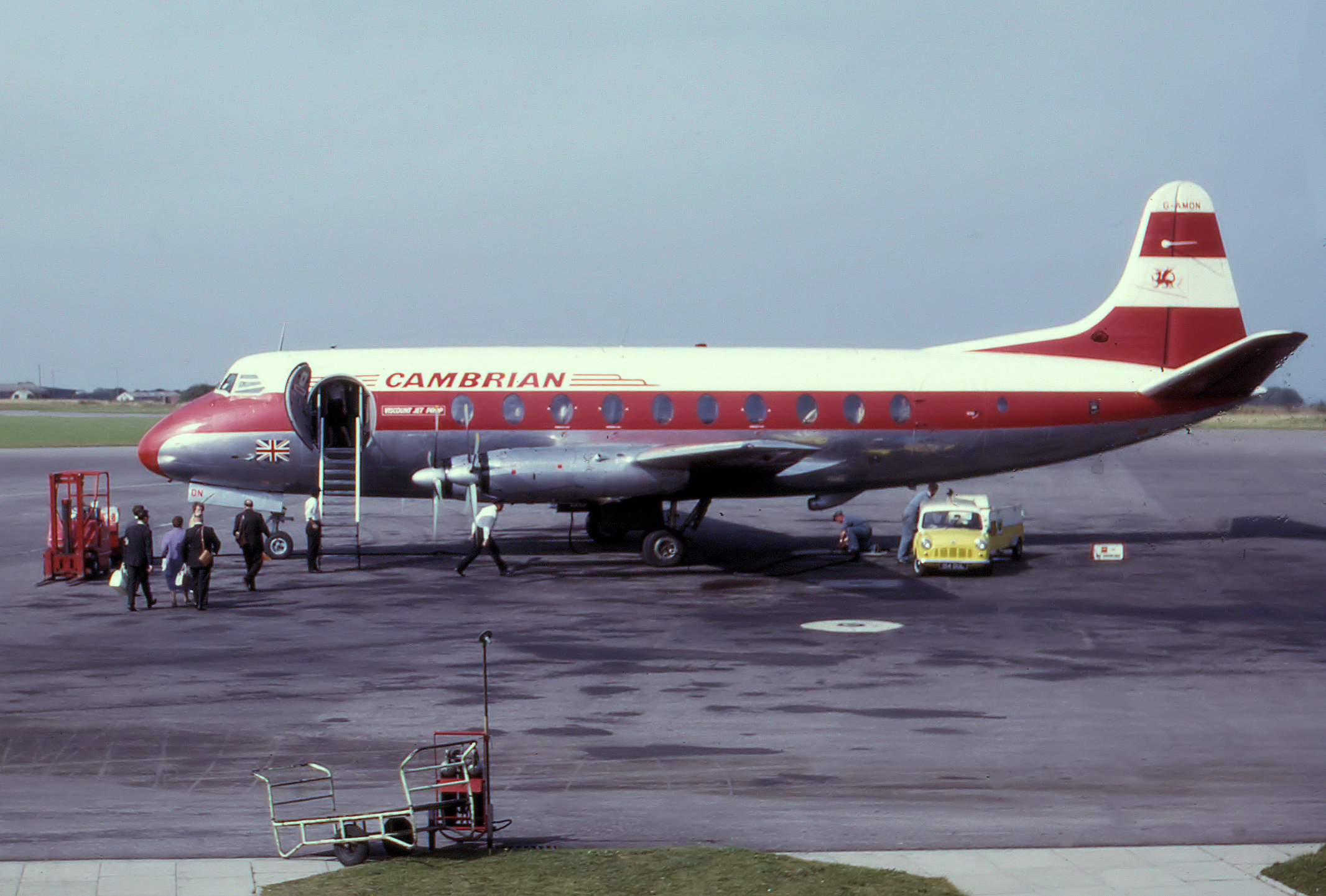
Viscount 701 of Cambrian Airways at Bristol Airport, 1963

BEA, and its nationalised successor British Airways (BA), vigorously operated the Viscount on Britain's domestic routes. In the 1980s, BA began withdrawing its ageing Viscount fleet; all BA Viscount operations in Scotland had ended in 1982. Former BA aircraft were often sold on to charter operators such as British Air Ferries. Some airlines chose to replace the Viscount with a newer turboprop aircraft, the Hawker Siddeley HS 748. On 18 April 1996, British World Airlines conducted the last Viscount passenger service in Britain, exactly 46 years after BEA's inaugural flight; on board the flight were Sir George Edwards and Sir Peter Masefield.

In late 1960, the People's Republic of China had begun negotiations with Vickers for as many as 40 Viscounts, but negotiations were protracted due to political tensions. At this point, China sought arrangements to purchase Viscounts second-hand from existing operators, and later achieved successive deals regarding the Viscount with Britain directly. The last batch of six aircraft built was for the Chinese CAAC Airlines, which was delivered during 1964; at the end of production. 445 Viscounts had been manufactured. Many Viscounts were refurbished and saw new service with African operators; sales of these second-hand aircraft continued into the 1990s.

The last airworthy Viscount, 9Q-COD, is believed to have been flown last in January 2009 for Global Airways in the Democratic Republic of the Congo.

== Variants ==
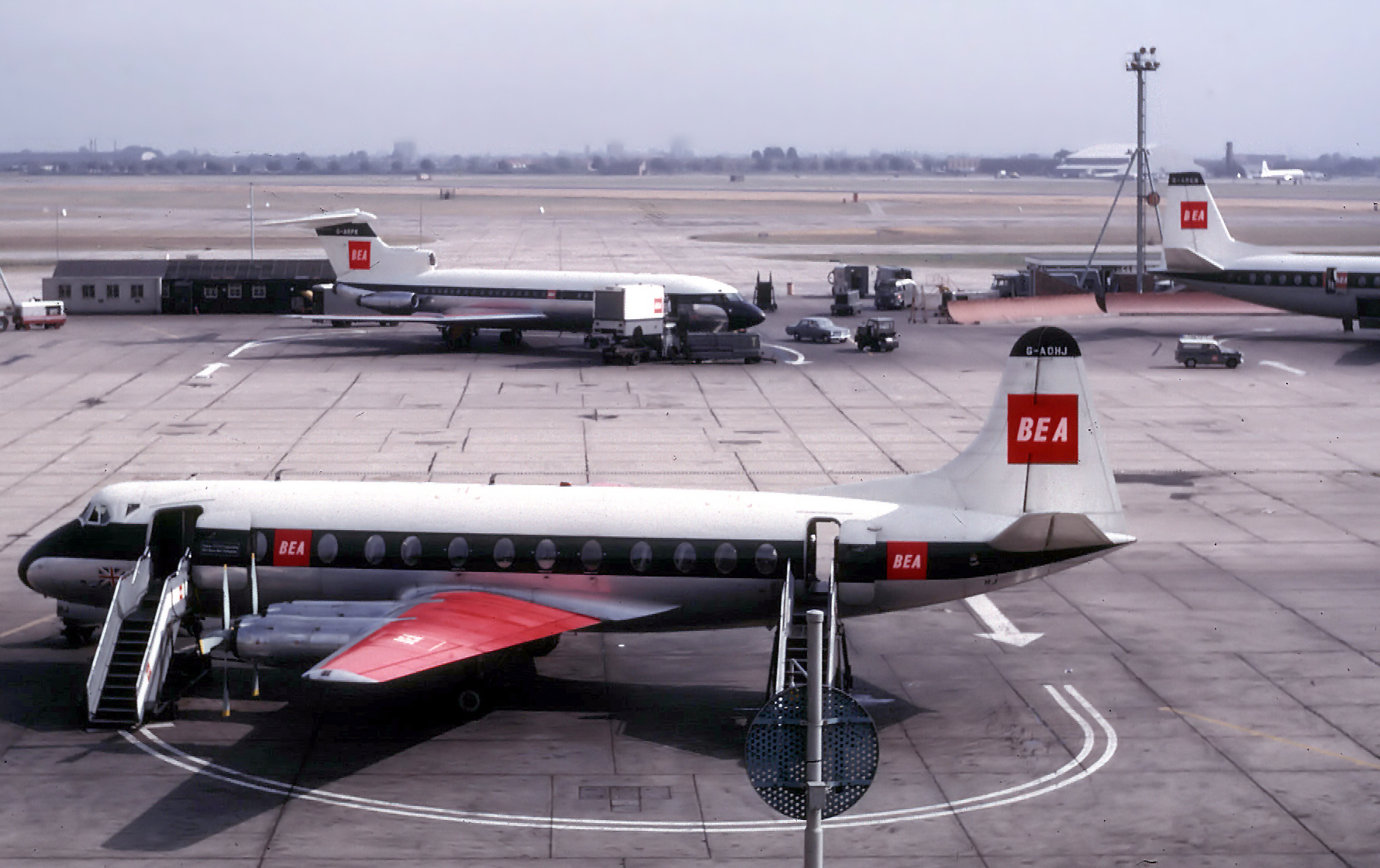
British European Airways Vickers Viscount 802 at London Heathrow Airport in 1964: Behind it is a BEA Hawker Siddeley Trident and on the right a BEA Vickers Vanguard.

Type 630
First prototype, with short fuselage (74 ft 6 in (22.71 m), accommodating 32 passengers and powered by four 1,380 ehp (1,032 kW) Rolls-Royce Dart R.Da Mk 501 engines.
Type 663
Second prototype, testbed for Rolls-Royce Tay turbojet.
Type 640
Planned third prototype, to be powered by four Napier Naiad turboprops. Not built, with parts incorporated in Type 700 prototype.
Type 700
The first production version, 1,381 hp (1,030 kW) engines, 287 built, the "D" suffix was used for aircraft powered by the 1,576 hp (1,175 kW) Dart 510 engines.
Type 800
Improved variant with fuselage extended by 3 ft 10 in (1.2 m), 67 built
Type 810
Improved longer-range variant with 1,991 hp (1,485 kW) Dart 525 engines, 84 built
VC-90
Brazilian Air Force designation for a VIP transport variant of the Viscount.

== Aircraft on display ==
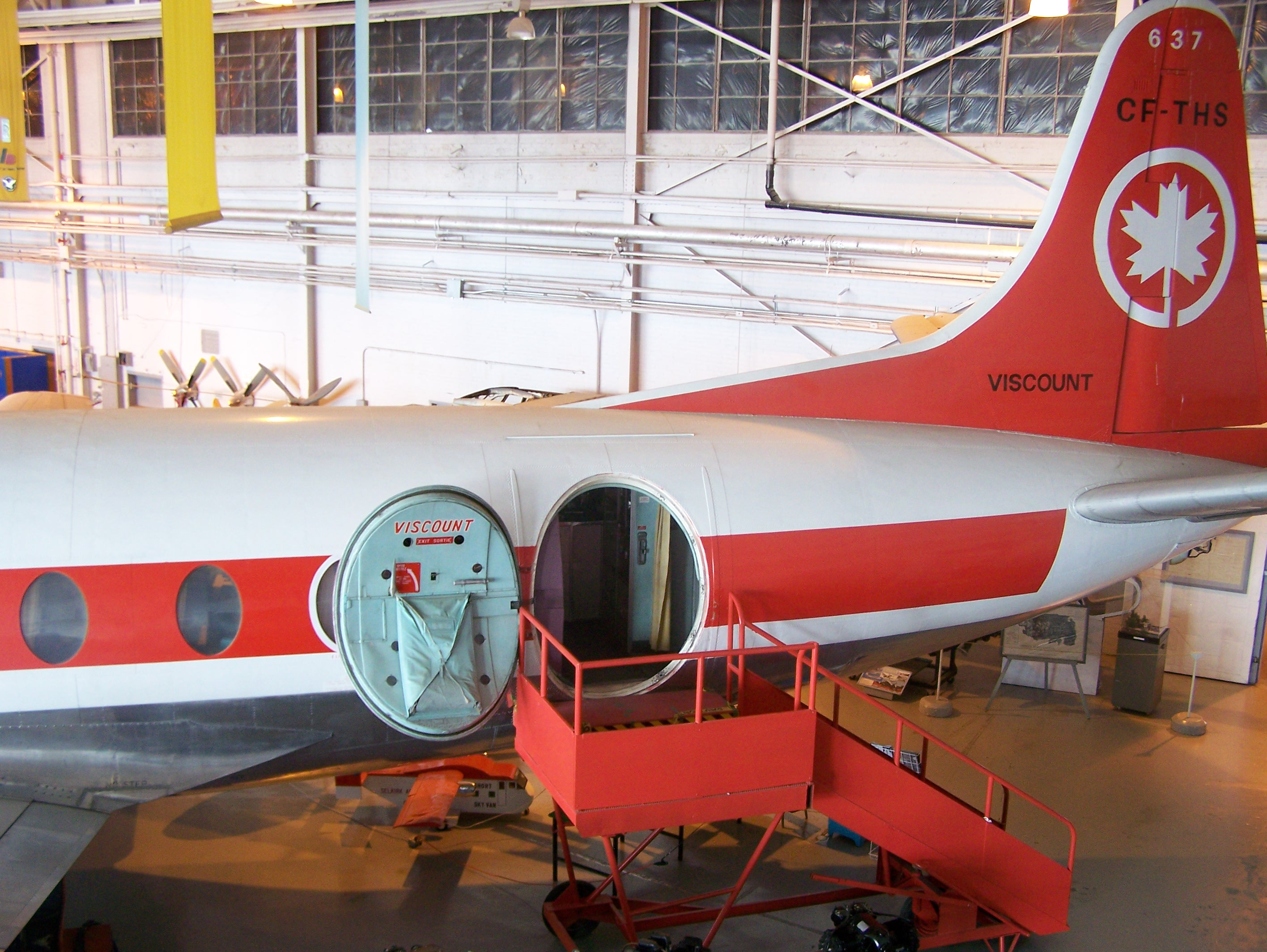
Tail fin of a Viscount 757 at the Western Canada Aviation Museum in Winnipeg, Manitoba.

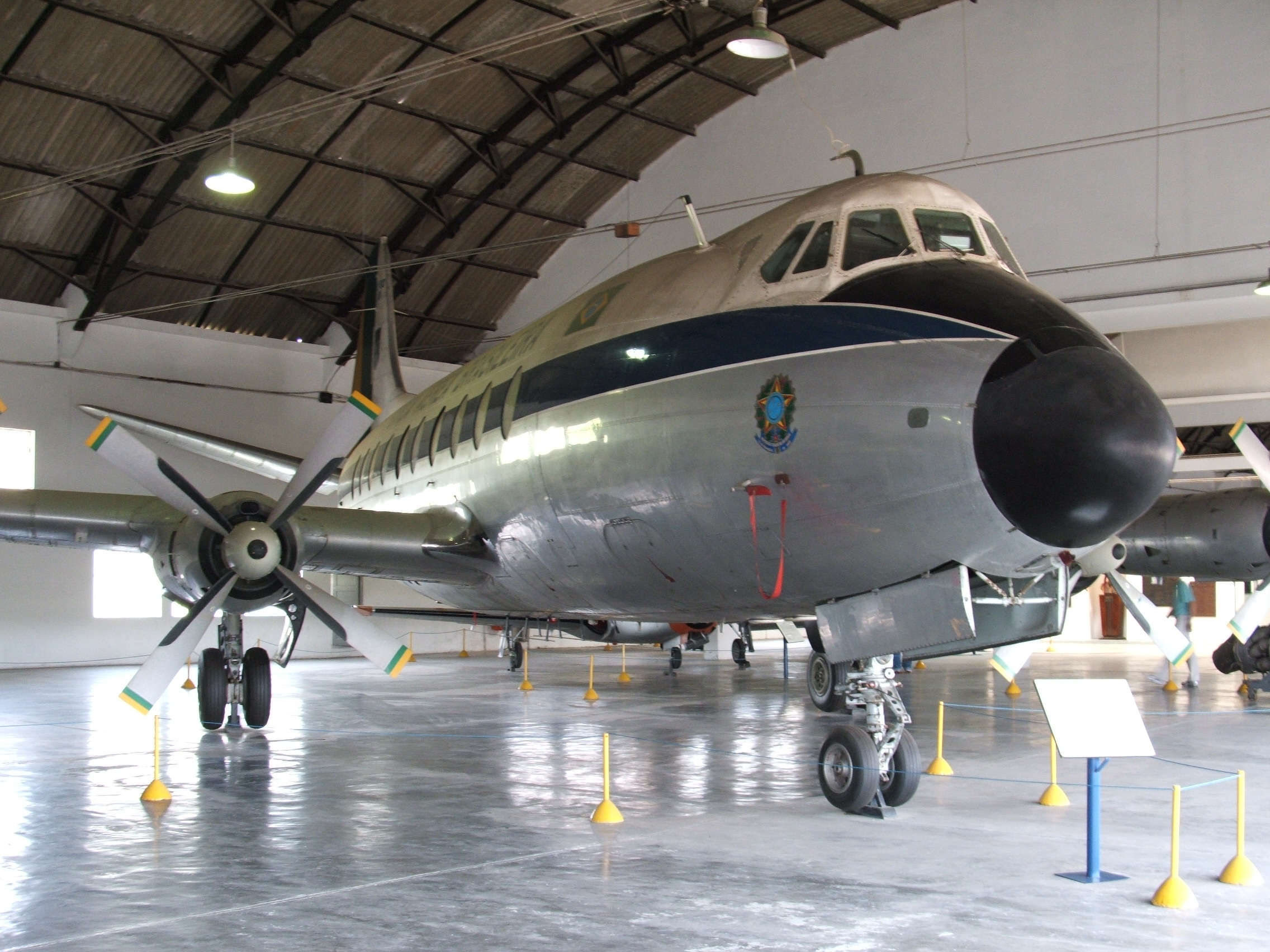
Brazilian Air Force Viscount used by Brazilian authorities on display at Brazilian Air Force Museum, in Rio de Janeiro

- Type 701A (Registration G-ALWF c/n 5) named Sir John Franklin, on display in BEA colours at Duxford, Cambridgeshire, England.
- Type 701 (Registration G-AMOG c/n 7) named Sir Robert Falcon Scott, on display in BEA colours at National Museum of Flight, East Fortune, East Lothian, Scotland.
- Type 701A (Registration PP-SRJ c/n 15) in VASP colours at a square in Araçariguama, São Paulo.
- Type 701C (Registration PP-SRO c/n 64) in VASP colours at the Museu Eduardo André Matarazzo, Jardim Recantro, Bebedouro, State of São Paulo, Brazil
- Type 708 (Registration F-BGNR c/n 35) once named Victoria Lynne, in Air Inter livery at the Midland Air Museum, Coventry Airport, England
- Type 708 (Registration F-BGNU c/n 38) on display in Air Inter style livery with Air France titles at Sinsheim Auto & Technik Museum, Germany.

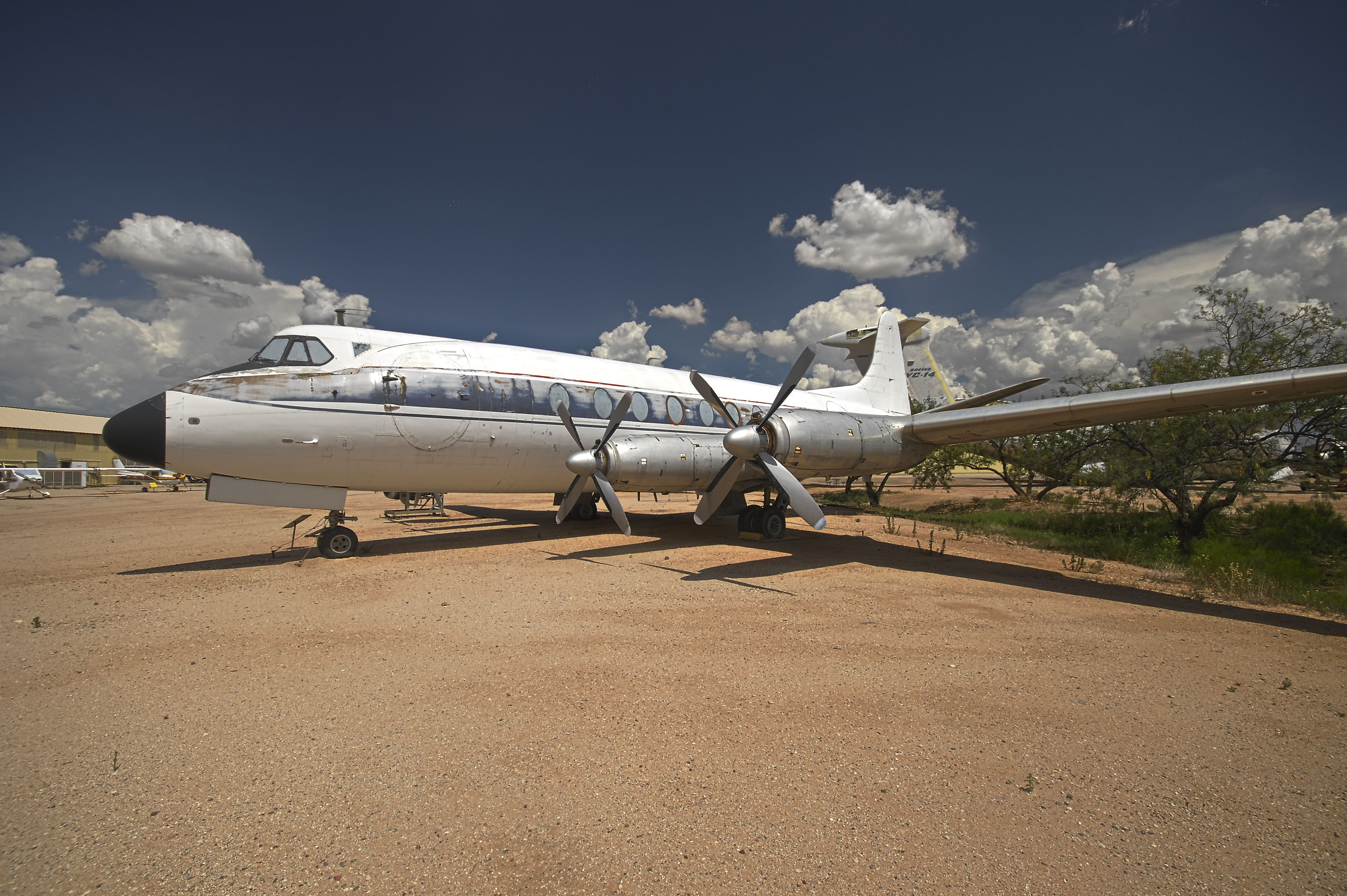
Vickers Viscount Type 724 (Registration N22SN c/n 40) in Viscount Air Services Inc. colours at the Pima Air & Space Museum, Tucson, Arizona, US.

- Type 724 (Registration N22SN c/n 40) in Viscount Air Services Inc. colours at the Pima Air & Space Museum, Tucson, Arizona, US. Originally delivered to Trans Canada Airlines as CF-TGI in early 1955, it operated the first international commercial flights in North America.
- Type 724 (Registration F-BMCF c/n 54) in Air Inter colours at the IAAG -Institute Aéronautique Amaury de la Grange, Merville-Calonne aerodrome, Merville, France
- Type 701 (Registration Z-YNA c/n 98) in Air Zimbabwe colours at the National Aviation Museum of Zimbabwe, Gweru, Zimbabwe
- Type 756C (Registration VH-TVL c/n 197) in Trans Australia Airlines colours (fuselage only, mated with replica wings) at Possum Park caravan park and camping ground, near Miles, Queensland, Australia.
- Type 757 (Registration N382S c/n 144) Brownsville Airport Emergency Services, Brownsville, Texas, US
- Type 757 (Registration CF-THG c/n 224) in Trans-Canada Air Lines colours fully restored at the British Columbia Aviation Museum, Sidney, British Columbia, Canada.
- Type 757 (Registration CF-THI c/n 270) on display in Trans-Canada Airlines colours at Canada Aviation and Space Museum, Rockcliffe, Ontario, Canada.
- Type 757 (Registration CF-THS c/n 279) on display in Air Canada colours at Western Canada Aviation Museum, Winnipeg, Manitoba, Canada.
- Type 794D (Registration TC-SEL c/n 430) in Turkish Air Force colours, Istanbul Aviation Museum.
- Type 789D (Serial Number FAB2101 c/n 345) on display in Brazilian Air Force colours at the Museu Aeroespacial, Campos dos Afonsos, Rio de Janeiro, Brazil.
- Type 798D (Registration I-LIRG c/n 284) in Alitalia colours at the "Istituto Tecnico Aeronautico Francesco De Pinedo", Roma, Italy.
- Type 798D (Original registration N7464 c/n 226), last true registration was XC-FOV. Once painted in fictitious 'Aero Puembo' livery with fictitious registration HC-CAG). Privately owned by the daughter of Carlos Alfredo Gudìño. The Viscount is at 'Laguardia', Puembo, Ecuador. It is fitted with a VIP interior including a bedroom. Not open to the public.
- Type 745D (Registration N7471 c/n 233) in original Capital Airlines colours, at the Mid-Atlantic Air Museum, Reading, Pennsylvania, US.
- Type 804 (Registration G-CSZB c/n 248) on static display at East Midlands Aeropark (nose section only)
- Type 806 (Registration G-APIM c/n 412) was named Viscount Stephen Piercey in 1984 while in service with British Air Ferries (BUAF); on display in BUAF colours at Brooklands Museum, Surrey, England.
- Type 807 (Registration ZK-BRF c/n 283) named City of Christchurch, on display at the Ferrymead Heritage Park, New Zealand.
- Type 813 (Registration G-AZNA c/n 350) named Viscount Banjul. Previously operated by British Midland Airways. On display at Dancing Kokorico, N9 baan Gent-Eeklo, Grote Baan 22, Lievegem, Belgium.
- Type 814 (Registration D-ANAM c/n 368) on display at Flugausstellung Hermeskeil at Hermeskeil in Germany.
- Type 814 (Registration D-ANAB c/n 369) Flugzeug Restaurant Silbervogel, Hanover, Germany.
- Type 814 (Registration D-ANAF c/n 447) Technik Museum Speyer, Speyer, Germany.
- Type 816 (Registration VH-TVR c/n 318) named John Murray, is on display in Trans Australia Airlines colours at the Australian National Aviation Museum, Moorabbin, Australia.
- Type 827 (Registration CX-BJA c/n 400) in PLUNA colours from the time it saw service. On display at the Colonel Jaime Meregalli Aeronautical Museum next to the Carrasco International Airport, Uruguay. Open to public.
- Type 843 (Serial Number 50258 c/n 453) in People's Liberation Army Air Force colours at the Beijing Air and Space Museum (previously known as Beijing Aviation Museum), People's Republic of China.

== Specifications (Type 810) ==
Data from British Civil Aircraft since 1919

General characteristics

- Crew: 2 pilots + cabin crew
- Capacity: 75 passengers
- Length: 85 ft 8 in (26.11 m)
- Wingspan: 93 ft 8 in (28.55 m)
- Height: 26 ft 9 in (8.15 m)
- Wing area: 963 sq ft (89.5 m^{2})
- Empty weight: 41,276 lb (18,722 kg)
- Max takeoff weight: 67,500 lb (30,617 kg)
- Powerplant: 4 × Rolls-Royce Dart Mk 525 turboprop, 1,990 hp (1,484 kW) each

Performance

- Maximum speed: 352 mph (566 km/h, 306 kn)
- Range: 1,380 mi (2,220 km, 1,200 nmi)
- Service ceiling: 25,000 ft (7,600 m)
- Wing loading: 75 lb/sq ft (370 kg/m^{2})
- Power/mass: 0.12 hp/lb (0.20 kW/kg)

== See also ==
Related development

- Vickers Vanguard

Aircraft of comparable role, configuration, and era

- Airspeed Ambassador – piston engine design to Type II specification
- Armstrong Whitworth Apollo – turboprop engine design to Type II specification
- Convair 540/580/600/640
- Ilyushin Il-18
- Lockheed L-188 Electra
