= Lockheed XF-90 =

Experimental aircraft

XF-90
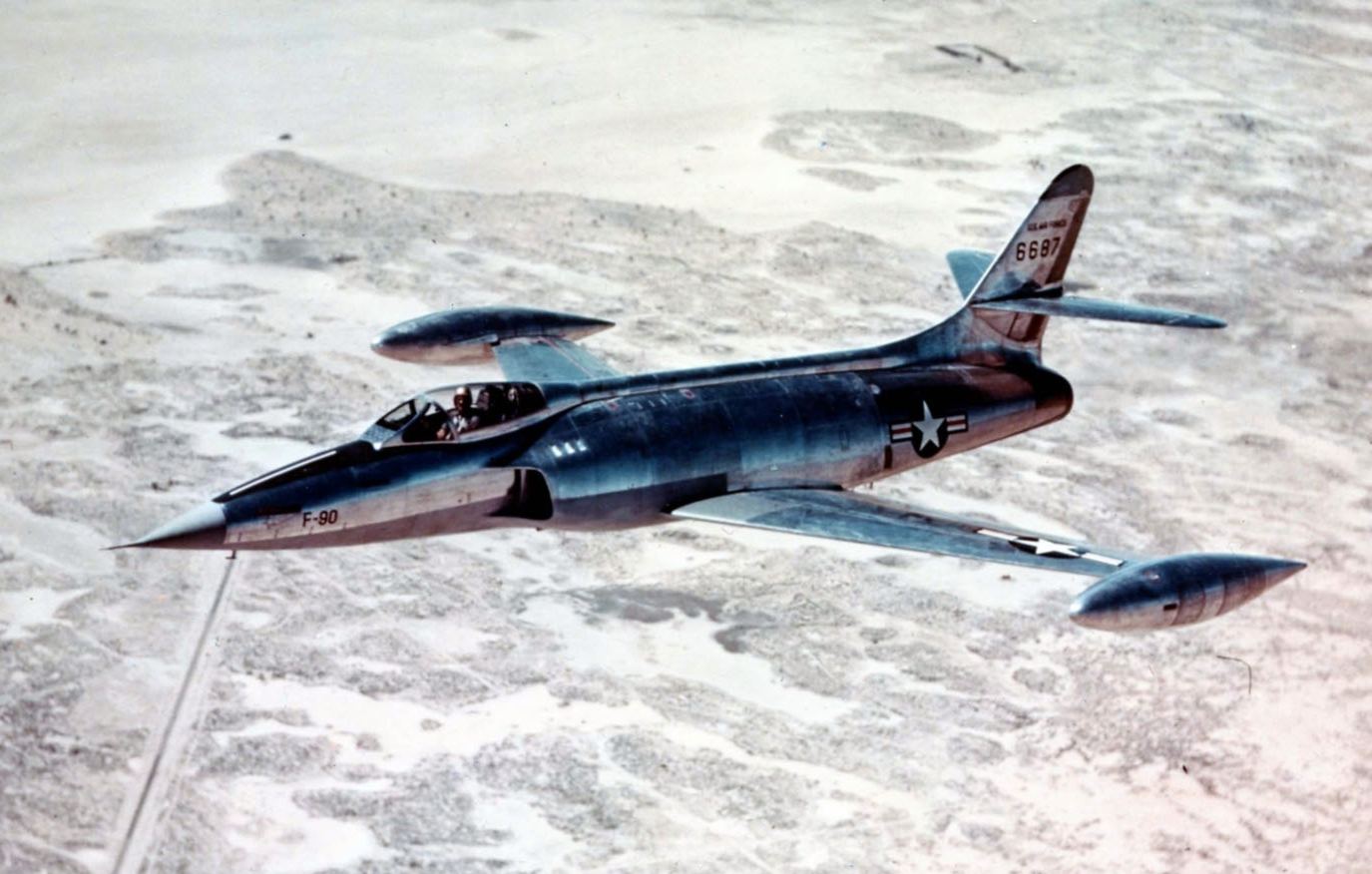
- XF-90 in flight

General information
- Type: Fighter
- Manufacturer: Lockheed
- Status: Canceled
- Primary user: United States Air Force (Intended)
- Number built: 2

History
- First flight: 3 June 1949

The Lockheed XF-90 was a long-range penetration fighter and bomber escort built for the United States Air Force. The same requirement produced the McDonnell XF-88 Voodoo. Lockheed received a contract for two prototype XP-90s (redesignated XF-90 in 1948). The design was developed by Willis Hawkins and the Skunk Works team under Kelly Johnson. Two prototypes were built (s/n 46-687 and -688). Developmental and political difficulties delayed the first flight until 3 June 1949, with Chief Test Pilot Tony LeVier at the controls. Embodying the experience gained in developing the P-80 Shooting Star, the XF-90 shared some design traits with the older Lockheed fighter, albeit with swept-wings; however, this latter design choice could not sufficiently make up for the project's underpowered engines, and the XF-90 never entered production.

== Design and development ==
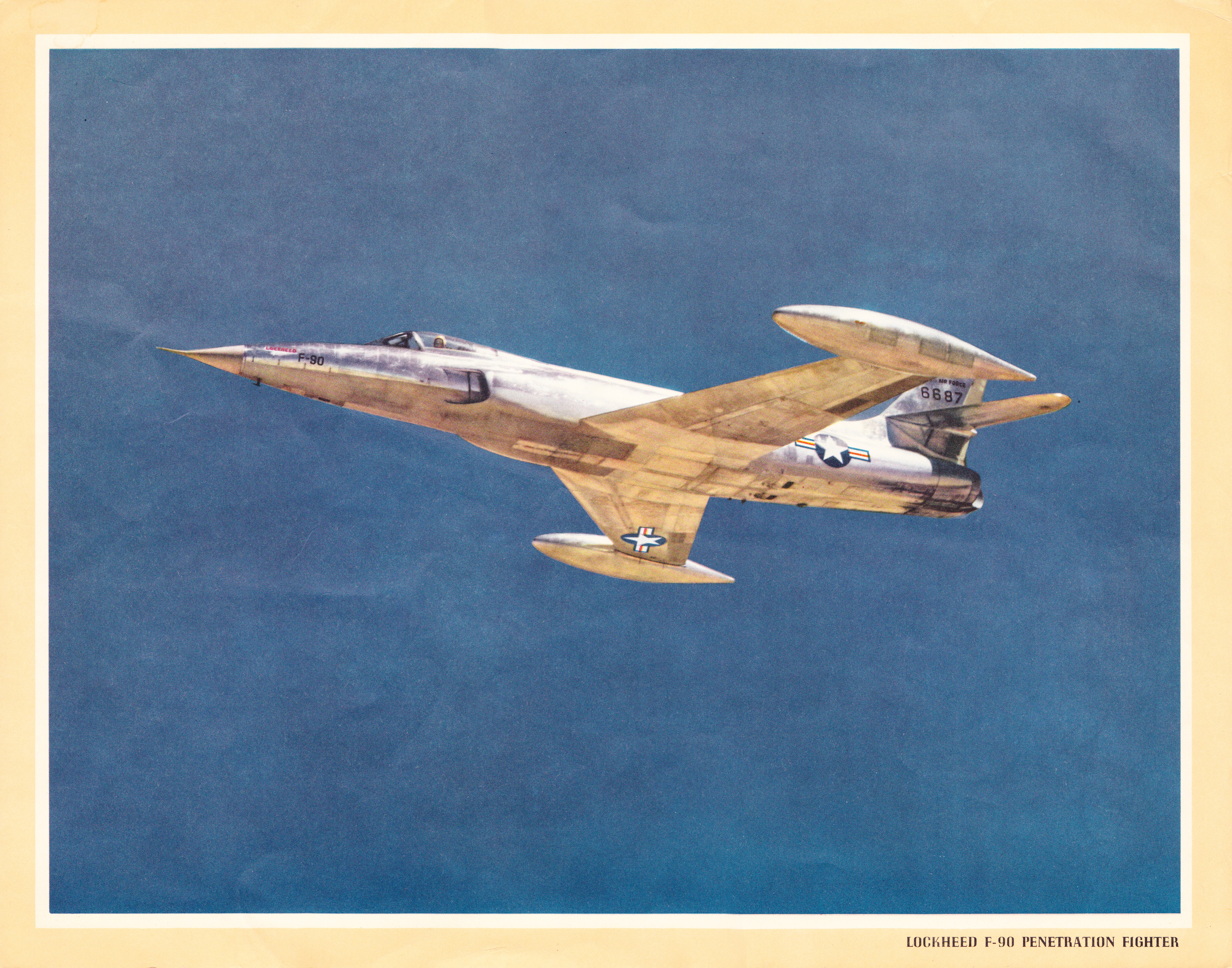

In response to a 1945 Army request for an advanced jet fighter, Lockheed proposed a jet powered initially by a Lockheed L-1000 axial flow turbojet, and then the General Electric J35. Further design refinements included using two Westinghouse J34 engines with afterburners. After data showed that a delta planform would not be suitable, the Lockheed Model 90 was built in 1947 as a mock-up.

The final design embodied much of the experience and shared the intake and low-wing layout of the previous P-80 Shooting Star, but with 35° swept-back wings, a sharply-pointed nose, and two Westinghouse J34-WE-11 axial-flow turbojet engines, providing a total thrust of 6,200 lbf (27.6 kN), mounted side-by-side in the rear fuselage and fed by side-mounted air intakes. The wings had leading edge slats, Fowler flaps, and ailerons on the trailing edge. The pressurized cockpit was fitted with an ejection seat and a bubble canopy. Proposed armament was six 20 mm (.8 in) cannons. The internal fuel was supplemented by tip tanks, bringing total fuel capacity to 1,665 gal (6,308 L). The use of 75ST aluminum rather than the then-standard 24ST aluminum alloy, along with heavy forgings and machined parts, resulted in a well-constructed, sturdy airframe. These innovations resulted in an aircraft with an empty weight more than 50% heavier than its competitors.

The first XF-90 used non-afterburning J34s, but these lacked the thrust for takeoff as rocket-assisted RATO were required for most of the first flights unless it carried a very low fuel load. The second (XF-90A) had afterburners installed which had been tested on an F-80 testbed. Even so, the aircraft remained underpowered.

== Testing and evaluation ==
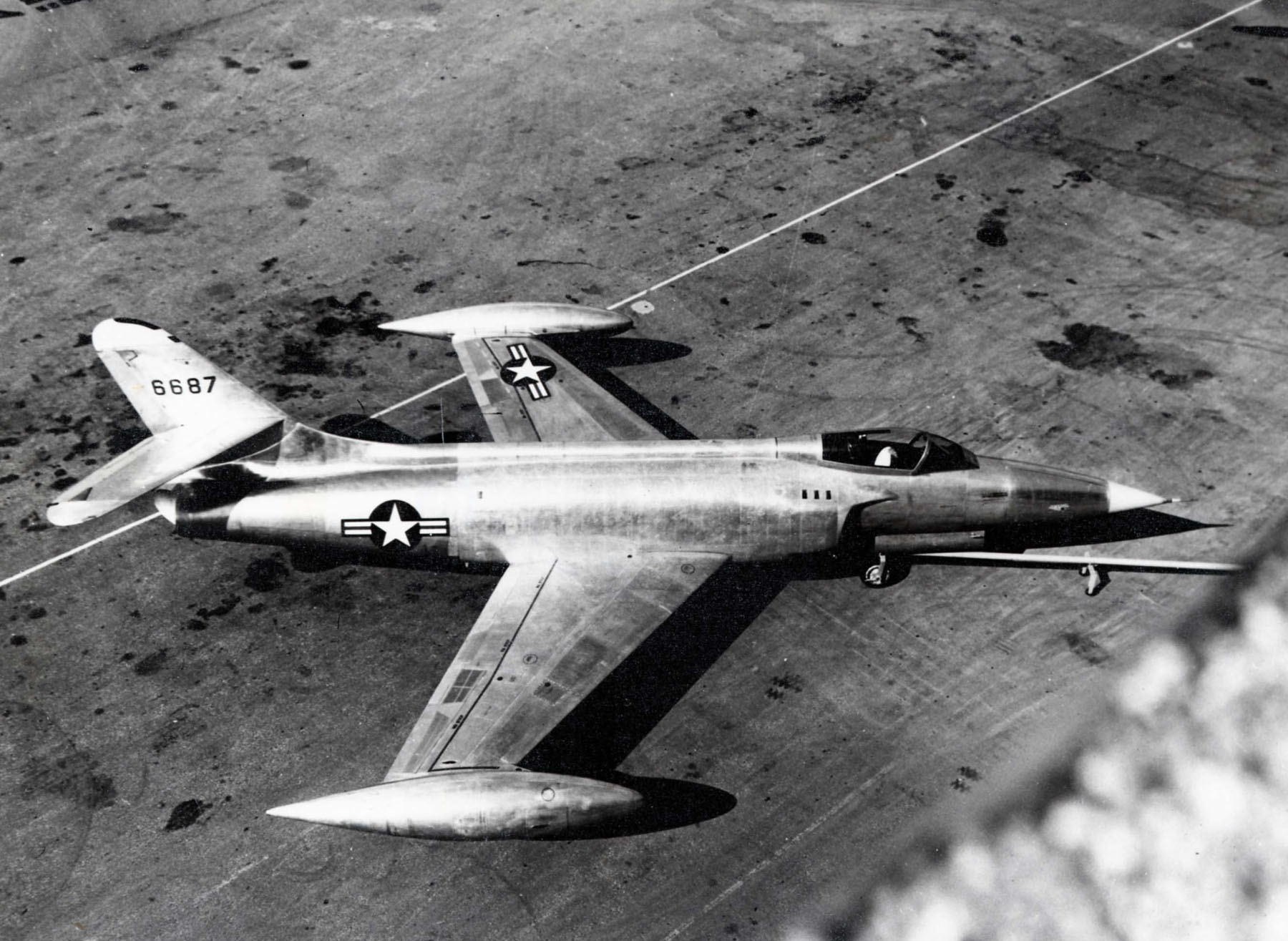
The first XF-90 prototype.

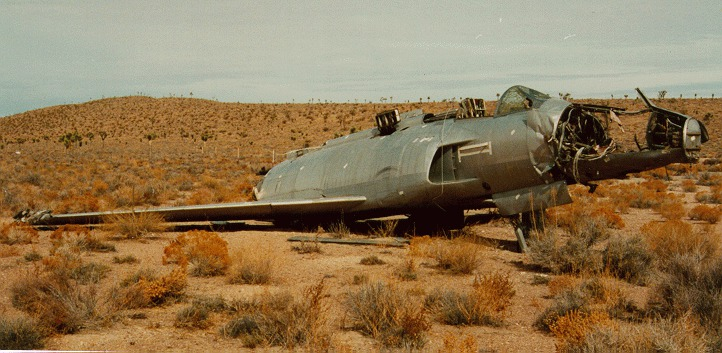
Remains of the second XF-90 prototype.

The XF-90 was the first USAF jet with an afterburner and the first Lockheed jet to fly supersonic, albeit in a dive. It also incorporated an unusual vertical stabilizer that could be moved fore and aft for horizontal stabilizer adjustment. Partly because Lockheed's design proved underpowered, it placed second to McDonnell's XF-88 Voodoo which won the production contract in September 1950, before the penetration fighter project was abandoned altogether.

Upon Lockheed losing the production contract, the two prototypes were retired to other testing roles. The first aircraft (46-687) was shipped to the NACA Laboratory in Cleveland, Ohio in 1953 for structural tests. It was no longer flyable, and its extremely strong airframe was tested to destruction. The other (46-688) survived three atomic blasts at Frenchman Flat within the Nevada Test Site in 1952.

== Notable appearances in media ==
The XF-90 lived on as the jet fighter aircraft flown by the popular Blackhawks Squadron in the comic book series of the same name, first published by Quality Comics and later by DC Comics. The Blackhawks flew fictional "B" and later "C" models all through the 1950s until 1964. Both were improved, single engine production variants of the original twin-engine Lockheed XF-90.

== Aircraft disposition ==
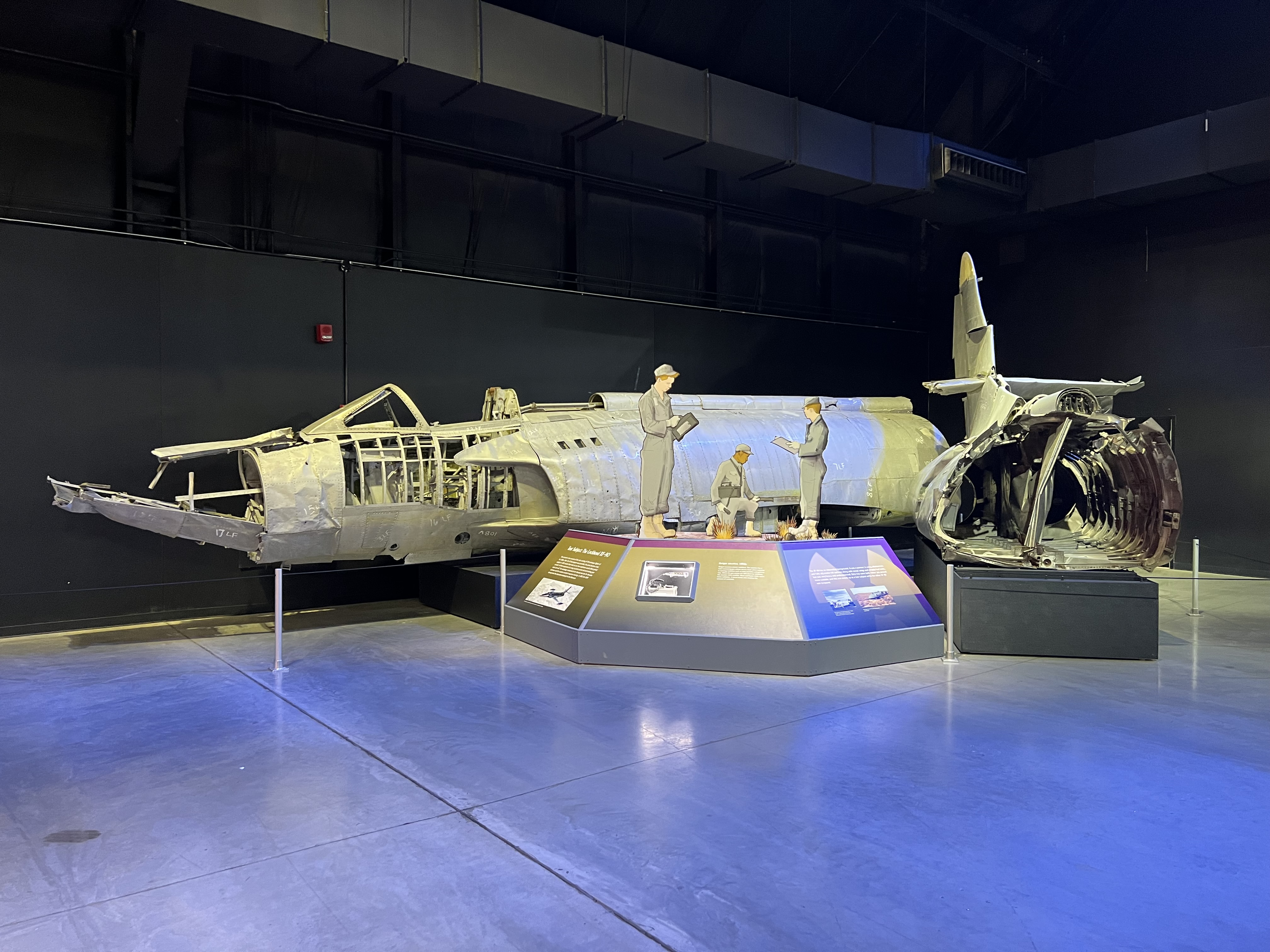
Remains of XF-90A 46-0688 at the National Museum of the United States Air Force.

- 46-0687 – tested to destruction at NACA lab in Cleveland, Ohio.
- 46-0688 – on display at the National Museum of the United States Air Force in Dayton, Ohio. In 2003, the heavily damaged hulk was recovered from the Nevada Test Site and moved there. Its wings have been removed, and its nose was mangled by the nuclear blasts. During the decontamination process, all rivets were removed to purge radioactive sand. The aircraft is now on display in the museum's Cold War gallery in a diorama depicting it on the Nevada Test Site.

== Specifications (XF-90A) ==
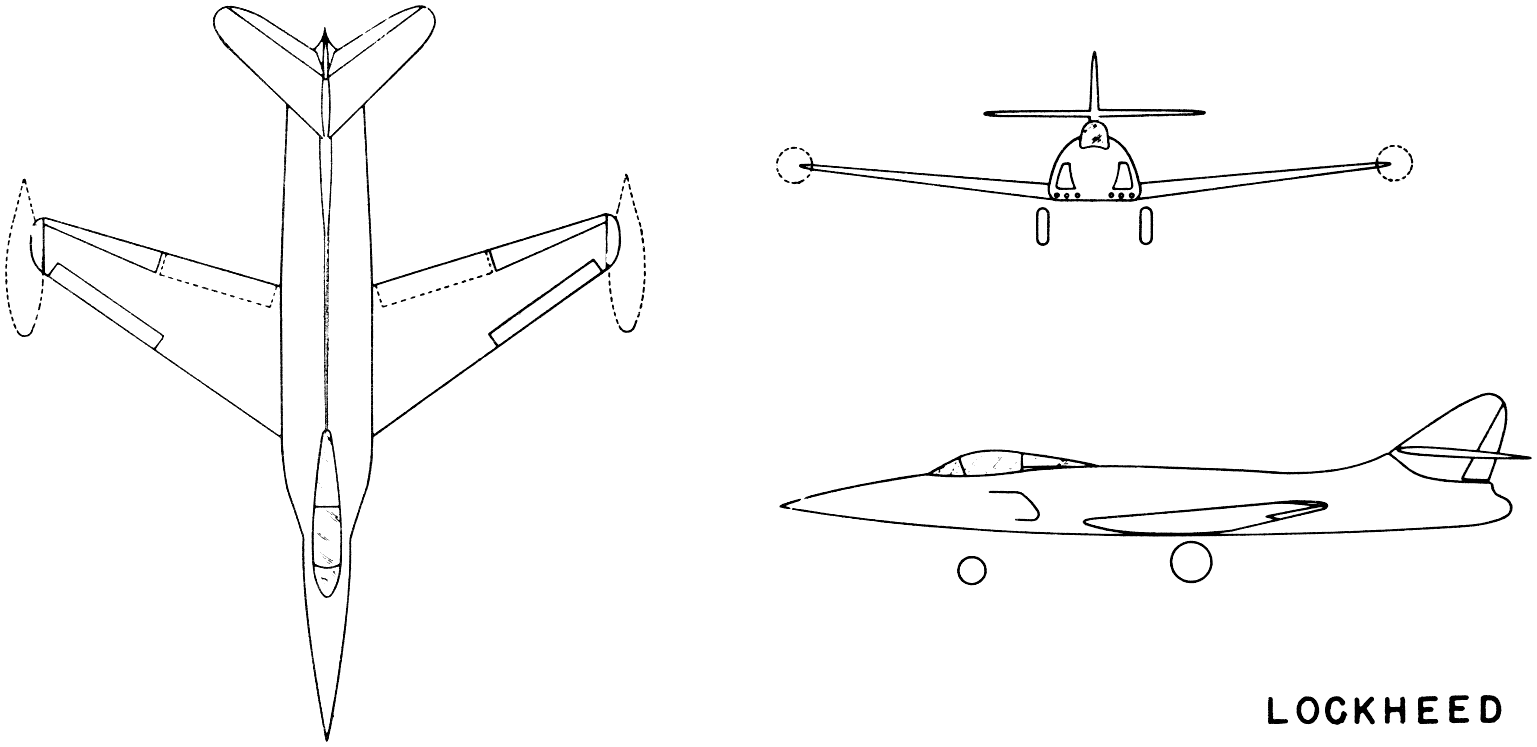
3-view line drawing of the Lockheed XF-90

General characteristics

- Crew: one
- Length: 56 ft 2 in (17.12 m)
- Wingspan: 40 ft 0 in (12.20 m)
- Height: 15 ft 9 in (4.80 m)
- Wing area: 345 sq ft (32 m^{2})
- Empty weight: 18,050 lb (8,204 kg)
- Gross weight: 27,200 lb (12,363 kg)
- Max takeoff weight: 31,060 lb (14,118 kg)
- Powerplant: 2 × Westinghouse J34-WE-15 turbojets, 4,100 lbf (18 kN) thrust each

Performance

- Maximum speed: 665 mph (1,064 km/h, 578 kn)
- Range: 2,300 mi (3,680 km, 2,000 nmi)
- Service ceiling: 39,000 ft (11,890 m)
- Rate of climb: 5,555 ft/min (28.2 m/s)
- Wing loading: 79 lb/sq ft (386 kg/m^{2})
- Thrust/weight: 0.30

Armament

- 6 × 20 mm (.79 in) cannons
- 8 × 5 in (127 mm) HVAR rockets
- Up to 2,000 lb (907 kg) of bombs

== See also ==
Aircraft of comparable role, configuration, and era

- McDonnell XF-88 Voodoo
- North American YF-93

Related lists

- List of Lockheed aircraft
- List of fighter aircraft
- List of military aircraft of the United States
