= Willis Hawkins =

American aeronautical engineer

External image
- Willis Hawkins, in front of a C-130, linked to from the http://www.godickson.com/ahsfv.htm web page, and ultimately from an LA Times Obituary.

Willis Moore Hawkins (December 1, 1913 – September 28, 2004) was an American aeronautical engineer for Lockheed for more than fifty years. He was hired in 1937, immediately after receiving his bachelor's degree in aeronautical engineering from the University of Michigan. Prior to that, he was in the first graduating class of The Leelanau School, a boarding school in Glen Arbor, Michigan. He contributed to the designs of a number of historic Lockheed aircraft, including the Constellation, P-80 Shooting Star, XF-90, F-94 Starfire, and F-104 Starfighter. During World War II, he was part of the group of Lockheed designers who designed the first American attempt at a jet plane, the Lockheed L-133.

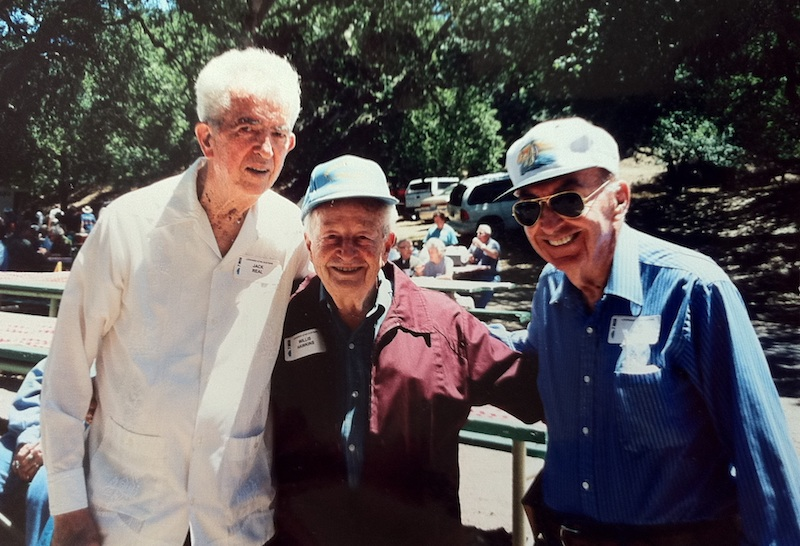
Jack Real, left; Willis Hawkins, center; Joseph Ware, Jr., right, at a StarDusters gathering.

In 1951, he led the design team that created the proposal for the Lockheed Model 82, which would become the C-130 Hercules, with Joseph F. Ware, Jr. as Flight Test Engineer in charge. Hawkins started the Lockheed Missiles and Space Company and served as president. He was elected a Vice President of the Lockheed Corporation in 1960 and later served on the corporation's board of directors. Hawkins served as Assistant Secretary for Research and Development for the US Army from 1962 to 1965, where he was instrumental in starting development of the M1 Abrams main battle tank. He retired from Lockheed in 1980, but Lockheed chairman Roy Anderson brought Hawkins back to run the Lockheed—California Company on an interim basis in the 1980s. Hawkins retired for good in 1986. He died in 2004 at the age of 90, after witnessing the celebration of the 50th anniversary of the C-130's first flight on August 23, 1954.
