= Nathan C. Price =

Nathan C. Price was an American engineer and inventor. He made substantial contributions to several US aircraft projects during the first half of the twentieth century.

== Early life ==
Nathan Cozens Price was born 20 December 1904 at Montclair, New Jersey. He was named for his grandfather. The 1940 US Census lists his age 35, birth of himself and father in New Jersey and mother in New York.

As an Eagle Scout, Nathan was a bodyguard for Prince of Wales in November 1919. He graduated from Glen Ridge High School, Montclair, New Jersey, in 1923.

A news item October 6, 1923 in Princeton, New Jersey, notes that “Nathan C. Price, of Glen Ridge, a graduate of the Glen Ridge High School, was given a scholarship from the individual scholarship funds to attend Princeton University.” He is listed as a resident at 66 Clark Street, Glen Ridge, in 1926.

== At Berkeley ==
Price then attended the University of California, Berkeley, where he was a senior in September, 1927.

1927-09-01 SF Chronicle U. C. Student Shot in Hand at Practice While practicing at target shooting with his revolver in the hills back of the Hotel Claremont, Berkeley, late yesterday afternoon, Nathan C. Price, 21, University of California senior, was shot through the left hand in trying to extract a shell which had jammed in the barrel of the gun. Immediately after the accident Price was taken to the university infirmary, where his wound was treated by Dr. R. T. Legge. Although very painful, the wound was declared to be not serious by Dr. Legge, who reported the accident to the Berkeley Police Station.

1929 Residence in Berkeley, California.

== Doble Steam Motors Experience ==
1930 Residence in Berkeley, single. Employed part time at Doble Steam Motors, Emeryville, California. 1932 After 5 years as a senior, he received Bachelor of Science in Engineering, from the University of California at Berkeley.

== Abner and Warren Doble Contract to Engineer a Steam Airplane ==
The steam airplane had been a constant publicity tease by Abner Doble since 1915. The Beslers had gained control of the company and needed publicity to stir up business in the depression. On November 27, 1929, Abner notes in his diary that the Besler brothers and Doble brothers have agreed to “Design and construct a steam airplane powerplant of 100 HP for steady operation. Dobles contribute engineering:- 25%, Beslers contribute everything else:- 75%.”

Not keeping the idea under wraps, Besler made his first news feed to the Associated Press three years before the demonstration flights:

June 25, 1930 AP Steam-Powered Plane. ALAMEDA. Cal. ( )— Work is being rushed here on what is thought to be the first steam-powered airplane in the United States. It is being built by William J. Besler, pilot-inventor. It will have a 2-cylinder compound type engine weighing about 300 pounds, with 150 horsepower.”

Deciding on the V-2 compound engine style, The model A engine was designed, built tested and photographed, but it was underpowered and enlarged three times. Abner leaves for New Zealand to consult. Eventually the A-2 engine was designed with larger displacement. Two boiler types were developed. Price's "turbo" blower was made to run belted to the engine tailshaft and clutched to a motor-generator for starting.

== Price Builds a Doble Steam Car ==
Abner Doble’s diary shows that his mother asked him to take her LaSalle to be converted to steam in April 1931. He assigned it to Nathan Price. Doble Steam Motors shop notes show car F-31 was started July 3, 1931 and delivered September 29, 1931 – Mileage was 13,200. Gear ratio 2:1. This is definitely the car Warren Doble had at Henchel in Kassel, Germany where it was also used by Richard Roosen.

In parallel, for the cars, a small V-2 compound engine was designed under Warren Doble as chief engineer as the Model I Auxiliary engine to replace the donkey pump in the F series cars in 1930. This engine layout was later co-opted by Besler in several iterations as the auxiliary engine was used in the Blue Goose railcar, an aircraft engine, and in other developments.

== Price Takes Over the Doble Steam Airplane Development for Besler ==
Warren Doble was edged out of the company August 11, 1932, and A-2, the second engine aircraft engine, was developed. Nathan C. Price performed and recorded the actual development in the Doble Steam Motors Experimental Test Reports, which had been historically Warren’s responsibility. This is confirmed by his initials on the reports.

Many Doble automotive components were used, but the relatively cramped engine space required some handmade items, notably Price's combustion blower. This blower fed a carburetor type burner, a monotube steam generator, and the two-cylinder, double acting V-2 piston steam engine based on Doble concepts. Price managed the herculean task of system balancing and design and construction development and eventually brought the system into adequate performance for a test flight.

The first installation in a Curtiss Robin fuselage was problematic, so Bill Besler bought a Travel Air 2000 for $600 and Price directed assembly in Emeryville. Final assembly with wings was done in the hangar of the Boeing School at the Alameda Airport and impressed the Boeing technical staff.

A quick proof flight, piloted by William J. Besler on April 12, 1933, was followed by a publicity event for the newsreels on April 16, and the plane was dismantled. By this time the Doble brothers had been pushed out of the company, Price finishing the project. The Beslers made sure the Doble and Price names were omitted from news, movies and photos of the flights. The Doble brothers' mother, May Doble, insisted that her sons not go up in the plane.

== Early career ==
With the two years of intense pressure finally off, Price married Constance De Luynee Holmes on 15 Apr 1933 at Alameda, California. Yes, this is the day before the Besler airplane demonstration. The Prices had two children.

Considering steam turbines, Price became chief engineer of the Universal Engine and Propeller Company and obtained a patent. His residence was in Berkeley in 1935. Sticking with airplanes, he was the speaker at the Eastbay Engineers Club on "The Development of Power Plants for Small Aeroplanes" in January 1936.ref: Price, N., "SMALL PLANE POWER PLANT DEVELOPMENTS OF UNIVERSAL ENGINE & PROPELLER COMPANY," SAE Technical Paper 350077, 1935,

Moving to Seattle, Washington, Price became Chief Engineer of Boeing in 1937. He testified in April 1939 on a Stratoliner crash. His draft registration in October 1940 shows him at Lockheed Aircraft Corp in Burbank and residing in Hollywood, California.

== Pressurized cabin ==
Before World War II, American airplane manufacturer Boeing had responded to a government solicitation for a large strategic bomber. Its proposal, the B-17 Flying Fortress, was considered "too big" by some members of Congress when additional financing was requested for the project. Fearing the project would be canceled and hoping to salvage something from the design effort, Boeing President Claire Egtvedt, who was aware that fledgling airline companies Trans World Airlines and Pan American World Airways were seeking the ability to operate their airliners above most of the frequent low-level turbulence on their routes, proposed that those airlines underwrite the cost of creating a pressurized airliner from components of the B-17. The Model 307 airliner would utilize the B-17's wings and tail.

The airliner's four Curtiss Wright R-1820 radial engines used crankshaft-driven two-speed superchargers both for added power and for greater performance at altitude. To provide pressurized air for the proposed cabin, the two inboard engines also drove (via a shaft) an additional supercharger mounted on each engine's firewall.

Dr. W. Randy Lovelace of the Mayo Clinic, was consulted; he advised that cabin pressurization begin at 8,000 feet MSL. Then pressurized air would be added as required to maintain an 8,000-foot cabin pressure. Above 16,000 feet MSL, cabin pressure would again decrease, due to the limited rating of the superchargers. The plane was expected to have a maximum cruise altitude of 20,000 to 22,000 feet MSL.

Price's cabin pressure regulator was the heart of the pressurization system. Its inlet valve regulated the flow of ventilating air to the cabin; its discharge valve opened as directed to maintain the required pressure. The valves' operations were controlled by a "black box", a maze of valves, venturis, and pleated metal bellows. Incoming air was drawn through slits on the wing leading edge; discharged air exited below the empennage.

Price received a United States patent for his work. After the prototype was working correctly, a contract was given to Garrett AiResearch in California to manufacture the components.

== P-38 supercharger ==
In 1937 the Lockheed Company responded to a government proposal for an advanced fighter with a two-engine design of unusual configuration. Designers opted to incorporate the Allison V-1710 engine, which used a single-stage supercharger. This severely limited its performance at higher altitudes, so Lockheed added exhaust-driven superchargers, which solved the altitude problem. The GE-supplied turbochargers were upgraded in 1941 for higher-altitude missions, so Lockheed contracted with Price to analyze the installation and provide improvements. He is credited with the system's success after that time.

== Axial-flow jet engine ==
Price started work on his own turbojet design in 1938. To improve fuel efficiency, he used a combination of low-compression axial compressor stages feeding a high-compression reciprocating compressor. In 1941 he was hired by Lockheed to evaluate the General Electric superchargers being fit to the experimental XP-49, a high-altitude version of the P-38. Price had the basic design of his jet completed and was able to attract the interest of Chief Research Engineer Kelly Johnson. Johnson had been thinking about a new high-speed design after running into various compressibility problems with the P-38 and the jet engine appeared to solve some of the problems. During 1941 he ordered the development of a new aircraft to be powered by Price's engine, developing the engine as the L-1000 and the aircraft as the L-133.

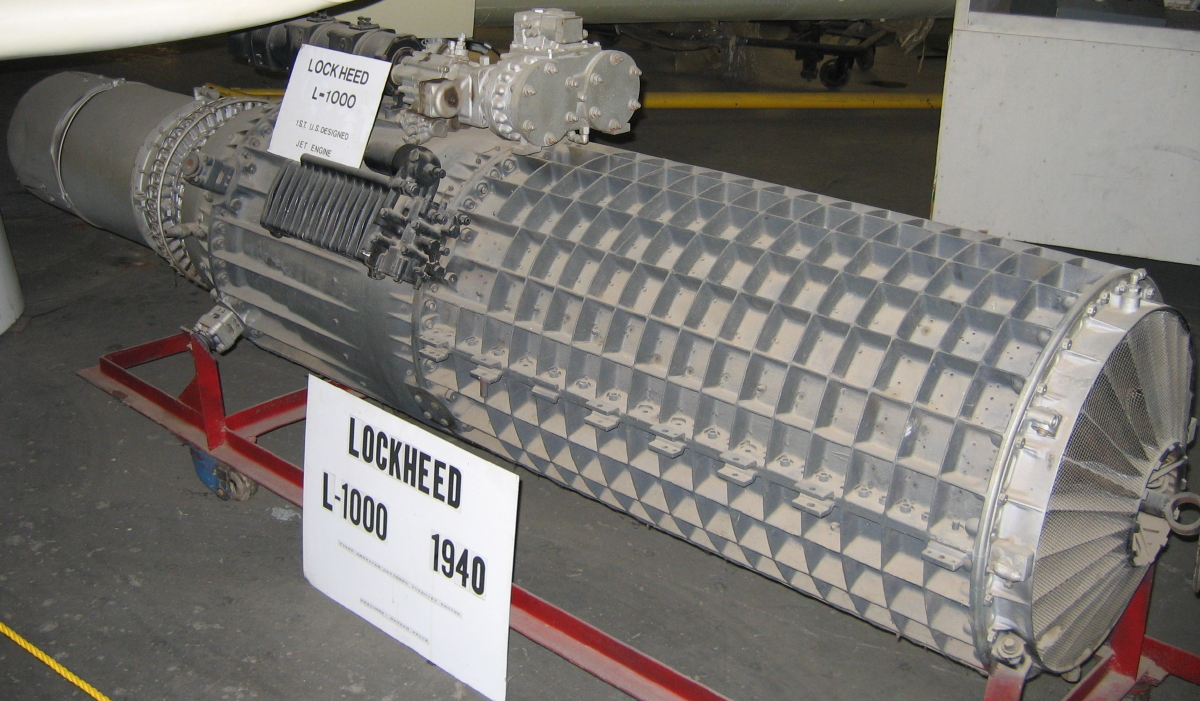
An L-1000 at the Planes of Fame Air Museum in Chino, California

The proposed engine was not officially accepted, because at that time the United States government was informed of British work on jet engines. However, Price was encouraged by United States Army Air Forces (USAAF) officials at Wright Field to refine his design. His redesign incorporated two sixteen-stage axial compressors with a single stage of intercooling. The first four stages of the forward compressor remained clutched to allow them to operate at optimum speed. The turbine was reduced to four stages. The low-pressure compressor was encased in a two-part cylindrical casing with stiffening ribs, which gave it an odd appearance similar to the bottom of an egg carton. The shorter high-pressure compressor was similarly encased, but with ribs running front-to-back only. Power was taken off between the two compressor stages to power accessories, with the gearbox placed on the top of the engine outside of the compressor casings.

In June 1943 the USAAF did give Lockheed a contract for a jet-powered airplane, but it was to incorporate a British turbojet. Thereafter, Price discontinued work on his design. The sole example of his engine is displayed at Planes of Fame Air Museum, in Chino, California.

== See also ==
- Hans von Ohain
- Frank Whittle
