= Lockheed J37 =

Early US turbojet engine

J37/L-1000
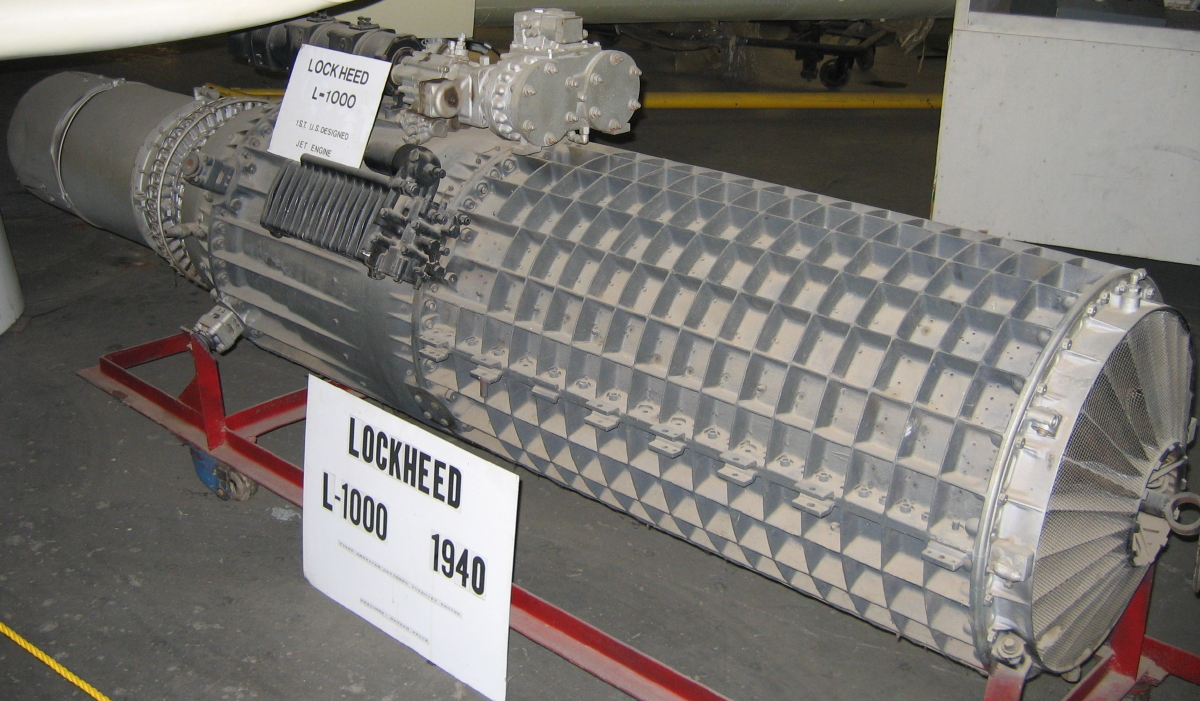
- An L-1000 at the Planes of Fame Museum in Chino, California
- Type: Turbojet
- National origin: United States
- Manufacturer: Lockheed Corporation
- First run: 1946

The Lockheed J37 (company designation L-1000) was one of the first turbojet engines designed in the United States. It was not considered very important when its development was first begun in the 1930s, and it was allowed to languish. By the time it was developed enough for production use, other engines, some British-derived, had surpassed it in performance. The design was later converted to a turboprop, the T35 and still later sold to Wright Aeronautical, where it saw some interest for use on what would become the B-52 Stratofortress, before that design moved to jet power. The J37 and T35 were built to the extent of a number of testbed examples but never entered production.

== Design and development ==
In 1930, Nathan C. Price joined Doble Steam Motors, a manufacturer of steam engines for cars and other uses. Over the next few years he worked on a number of projects and starting in autumn 1933 began working on a steam turbine power plant for aircraft use. Steam generation at high altitudes required air to be pressurized to sea level pressure and delivered at a constant rate to a steam generator's burners; Price proposed using a centrifugal compressor powered by a small gas turbine which was in turn driven by the hot gasses from a burner located between the compressor and turbine. Hot gasses exiting the turbine were then passed on to a steam generator, the output of which would then drive steam turbines connected to propellers (US Patent 2,223,856).

Price started work on his own turbojet design in 1938, although this initial design was far more complex than what eventually emerged as the J37. In an effort to keep the fuel efficiency of the engine similar to existing piston engine, Price used a combination of low-compression axial compressor stages feeding a high-compression reciprocating compressor. In 1941 he was hired by Lockheed to evaluate the General Electric superchargers being fit to the experimental XP-49, a high-altitude version of their famous P-38. By this time Price had the basic design of his jet completed and was able to attract the interest of Lockheed's Chief Research Engineer, Kelly Johnson, who would later found the company's famous Skunk Works. Johnson had been thinking about a new high-speed design after running into various compressibility problems at high speed with the P-38 and the jet engine seemed like a natural fit in this project. During 1941 he ordered the development of a new aircraft to be powered by Price's engine, developing the engine as the L-1000 and the aircraft as the Lockheed L-133.

Later that year the Tizard Mission arrived in the US and presented many technological advances being worked on in England, including information on Frank Whittle's jet engine designs. Rumors of similar work in Germany and the well-publicized flights in Italy suggested that practically everyone but the US was working on jets and getting a design of their own suddenly took on the utmost importance. Vannevar Bush, Tizard's counterpart in the US, decided the best course of action was to simply license the British designs. A committee under the direction of William F. Durand was set up to put the British designs into production and build an aircraft to test them. These projects emerged as the General Electric J31 powering the P-59 Airacomet.

On 30 March 1942, Lockheed submitted proposals for the L-133 and L-1000 to the US Army Air Force's development division at Wilbur Wright Field. By this point the original design proved too complex and had evolved into a new design replacing the pistons with a set of three centrifugal stages, with intercooling between each of the stages. The main combustor was a "canular" type with twelve flame cans in an annular container, feeding their exhaust to a five-stage axial turbine. For additional thrust, fuel could be sprayed between the turbine stages. To fine-tune performance at different altitudes, the compressor and turbine stages were coupled using a variable-speed hydraulic clutch. The design called for a weight of 1,700 lb (775 kg) and a sea level thrust of 5,100 lbf (22700 N). By November 1942 the design had been further refined, with the weight settling at 1,610 lb (735 kg) and the combustion area using chrome-steels. The Army remained uninterested and Lockheed apparently started getting cold feet.

Nevertheless, on 19 May 1943 Price agreed to start a more radical redesign at the urging of Wright Field. He produced a much simpler design consisting of two sixteen-stage axial compressors with a single stage of intercooling between them. The first four stages of the frontmost compressor remained clutched to allow them to operate at optimum speed. For testing purposes the compressor blades had no airfoil shaping and were attached to the central hub on rotating mounts to allow their angles to be changed between runs. The turbine was reduced to four stages. The low-pressure compressor was encased in a two-part cylindrical casing with stiffening ribs, which gave it an odd appearance similar to the bottom of an egg carton. The shorter high-pressure compressor was similarly encased but with ribs running front-to-back only. Power was taken off between the two compressor stages to power accessories, with the gearbox placed on the top of the engine outside of the compressor casings.

In June 1943 the Army eventually demonstrated their interest in a Lockheed jet design but contracted for the P-80 Shooting Star, to be powered by a licensed version of the centrifugal-flow Halford H.1. They remained interested in the L-1000 as well and sent out a long-term development contract under the name XJ37-1 in July 1943 with the first delivery on 1 August 1945. However, when the war ended the first example was only about two thirds complete. Some of the work had been contracted out to Menasco Motors Company and at the end of the year the entire mechanical side of the project was turned over to them. The XJ37 was being worked on at the same time as competing Westinghouse axial-flow designs undergoing development, the 19A and 19B, were being test-run through the 1943-45 period, resulting in America's first production axial-flow turbojet engine, the Westinghouse J30, of which some 260 examples were made for the earliest American military jets for the U.S. Navy, and for the first American delta-wing fighter design, the Convair XF-92.

The first engine was finally ready for operation in 1946. The Army contracted for another four examples. Around this time a turboprop version was proposed, the XT35 Typhoon. This was a fairly simple adaptation of the J37, adding a fifth turbine stage at the rear of the engine, containing a radial turbine that drove the pusher propeller and exited the exhaust around the outer rim of the engine. An alternate arrangement would send the exhaust through an opening in the propeller boss. In September 1947 Lockheed finally threw in the towel and sold the design to Wright Aeronautical.

At the time the Army (soon to be US Air Force) was in the process of developing a new truly intercontinental bomber. Given engine and airframe technology at that time it appeared that the only way to build such an aircraft would be to use turboprops and Wright was interested in capturing that market. In June 1946 Boeing proposed their Model 462 to fill the requirement, featuring six T35 engines, later reduced to four in a series of redesigns. However, by 1948 advances in airframe design, particularly the introduction of the swept wing, allowed the bomber to move to jet power, eventually leading to the B-52 Stratofortress.

Work on the J37/T35 continued until July 1953, by which point three engines had been delivered to the USAF. The Air Force turned over the engines and all collected data to the industry as a whole. No further interest was forthcoming and the project ended after an estimated $4.5 million (~30 million year 2000 dollars) had been spent.
