= Lockheed L-133 =

Proposed US jet fighter design

L-133 "Starjet"
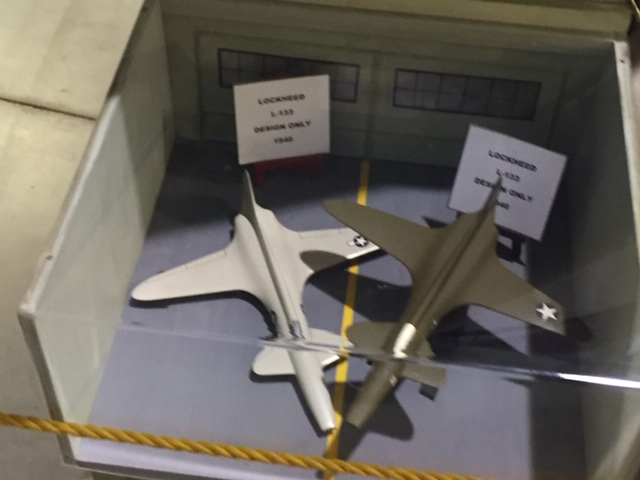

General information
- Type: Fighter
- National origin: United States
- Manufacturer: Lockheed Corporation
- Primary user: United States Army Air Forces

The Lockheed L-133 was an exotic design started in 1939 which was proposed to be the first jet fighter of the United States Army Air Forces (USAAF) during World War II. The radical design was to be powered by two axial-flow turbojets with an unusual blended wing-body canard design capable of 612 mph (985 km/h) in level flight. The USAAF rejected the 1942 proposal, but the effort speeded the development of the USAAF's first successful operational jet fighter, the P-80 Shooting Star, which did see limited service near the end of war. The P-80 was a less radical design with a single British-based Allison J33 engine, with a conventional tail.

== Development ==
The Lockheed aviation company was the first in the United States to start work on a jet-powered aircraft. The L-133 design started in 1939 as a number of "Paper Projects" by engineers Clarence L. "Kelly" Johnson, Willis M. Hawkins and Hall L. Hibbard. By 1940 preliminary work on a company-financed jet fighter had been started, which progressed to several different versions on the drawing board. In the meantime, Lockheed was working on an axial-flow L-1000 turbojet engine of their own design, which was intended to power the culmination of the twin-engine jet fighter project, the Model L-133-02-01.

Throughout World War II, the development of a jet-powered fighter had the potential to bring a decisive advantage in the air battles of the war; as history played out, only Germany built significant numbers of jet fighters before the war ended, but they reached service in the Luftwaffe too late to make a difference.

On 30 March 1942, Lockheed formally submitted the L-133-02-01 to the USAAF for consideration. Powered by two L-1000 turbojets and featuring a futuristic-appearing canard design with slotted flaps to enhance lift, the single-seat fighter was expected to have a top speed of 612 mph (985 km/h) in level flight, but a range of only 310 miles (500 km)

Profile views of the Lockheed L-133

The L-133 had a main wing shape that was essentially identical to the outer wing sections of the Lockheed P-38 Lightning. In many respects the L-133 was far ahead of its time, with futuristic features including:

- canard layout;
- blended wing-body planform; and,
- two engines in a very low-drag integral fuselage location.

The USAAF considered the L-133 to be too advanced for the time, and did not pursue the project. The experience gained with the design served Lockheed well in the development of the USAAF's first operational jet fighter, the P-80 Shooting Star. Although entering combat service after the war had ended, the P-80 was less advanced than the L-133. Because the USAAF didn't give the L-133 project the go-ahead, the advanced engines intended for the L-133 had long pauses in their development. The most expedient engine choice for the P-80 thus became the Allison J33, based on British centrifugal compressor designs. The P-80 was a cheap-to-build single-engine aircraft with a conventional wing and tailplane design, not using the blended wing-body and canard layout of the L-133.

== Specifications (L-133-02-01) ==
Data from

General characteristics

- Crew: 1
- Length: 48 ft 4 in (14.73 m)
- Wingspan: 46 ft 8 in (14.22 m)
- Wing area: 325 sq ft (30.194 m^{2})
- Powerplant: 2 × Lockheed L-1000 axial-flow turbojets , 5,100 lbf (23 kN) thrust each

Performance

- Maximum speed: 625 mph (985 km/h, 543 kn)

Armament

- 4 × 20mm nose-mounted cannon

== See also ==
- Planes That Never Flew

Aircraft of comparable role, configuration, and era

- Heinkel He 280
- Gloster Meteor
- McDonnell XP-67
- Messerschmitt Me 262

Related lists

- List of fighter aircraft
- List of military aircraft of the United States
