= Lockheed P-80 Shooting Star =

First jet aircraft in U.S. operational service

P-80 / F-80 Shooting Star
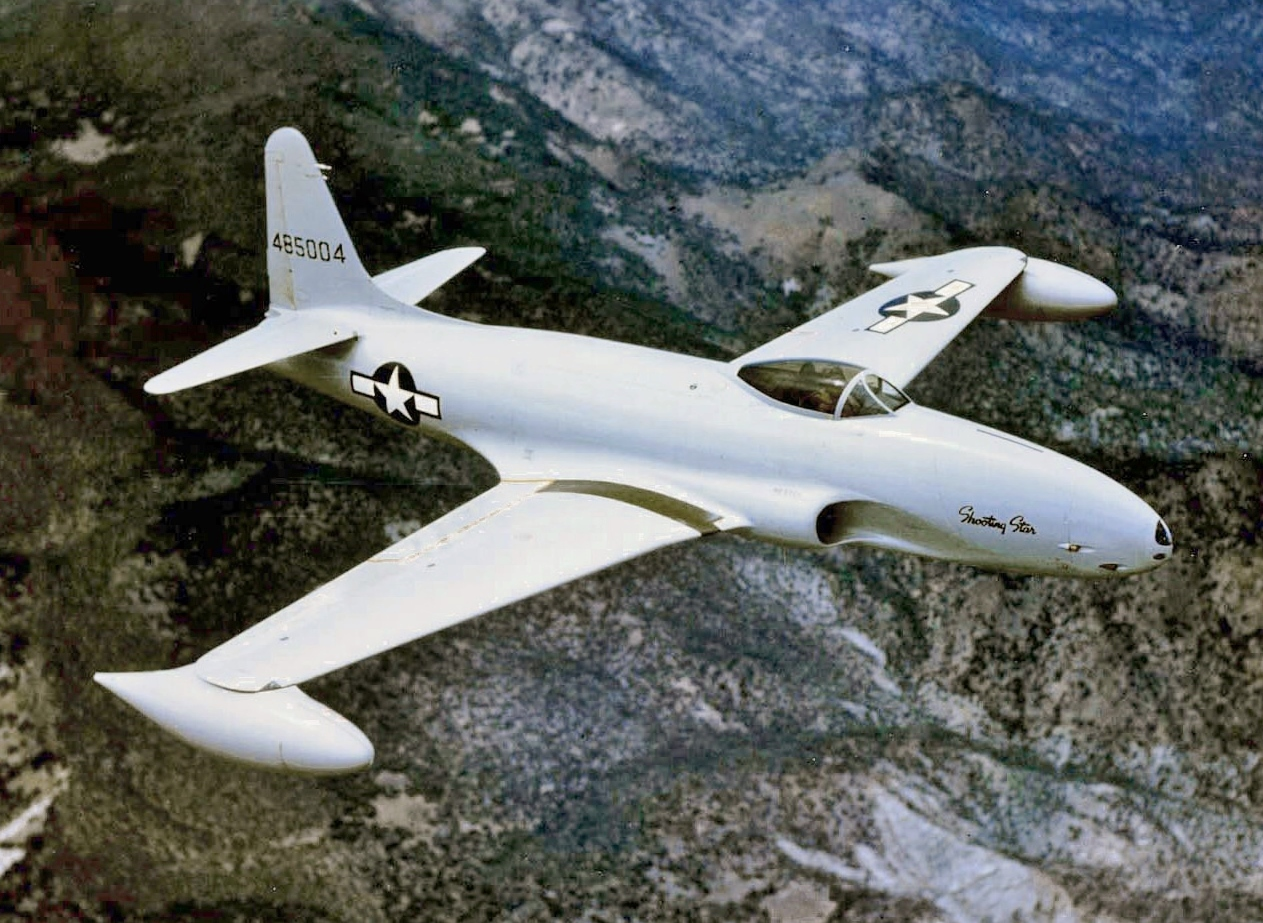
- P-80A with "tip tanks"

General information
- Type: Jet fighter
- National origin: United States
- Manufacturer: Lockheed Corporation
- Designer: Clarence "Kelly" Johnson
- Primary users: United States Air Force: United States Navy; Chilean Air Force; Colombian Air Force
- Number built: 1,715

History
- Manufactured: 1945–1950
- Introduction date: 1945; 81 years ago
- First flight: January 8, 1944; 82 years ago
- Retired: 1959; 67 years ago (United States); 1974; 52 years ago (Chile)
- Developed into: Lockheed T-33 Shooting Star; Lockheed F-94 Starfire

The Lockheed P-80 Shooting Star is an early jet fighter that was designed and built by Lockheed. It was the first jet aircraft to be used operationally by the United States Army Air Forces (USAAF), flying active missions during the latter months of World War II.

The P-80 has its origins in Lockheed's earlier L-133 design study, although the USAAF ultimately passed it over in favor of the competing Bell P-59 Airacomet for it being technologically unfeasible. However, after the P-59's performance proved to be lacking and the discovery of Nazi Germany's Me 262 combat jet in spring 1943, Lockheed was instructed to commence work on what would become the XP-80 in May 1943. Developed to accept the British-made Halford H-1 B "Goblin" turbojet engine, it was worked on by 128 engineers led by Clarence L. "Kelly" Johnson in what became known as the Skunk Works. Design work on the airframe started on 26 June 1943, and the first aircraft was delivered to Muroc Army Airfield only 143 days later. On 8 January 1944, the first prototype performed its maiden flight. During early flights of the P-80, multiple pilots lost their lives, including one of America's top aces, Richard Bong. By the end of 1944, 12 preproduction aircraft had been delivered to the USAAF. While these two aircraft saw limited service in Italy just before the end of World War II, they never engaged in direct combat. (Note: In contrast, Gloster Meteors, the first Allied jet fighters, were directed against the V-1 flying bomb in mid-1944 and scored numerous kills; they were subsequently deployed onto the continent to seek out enemy combatants over Allies-held territory.)

Production of the P-80 continued after the conflict, being adopted by both the United States Navy (USN) and the newly formed United States Air Force (USAF), the latter assigning it the designation F-80. The type was deployed widely during the opening years of the Cold War, forming part of the response to events such as the Berlin Blockade. It saw extensive combat operations during the Korean War, both as a fighter and as a photoreconnaissance aircraft. At its height, no fewer than 10 USAF squadrons were operating the F-80C over Korea. By the end of the conflict, though, fighter models of the F-80 had already been withdrawn from the Korean theater in favor of other platforms. Although the aircraft had been America's first successful turbojet-powered combat aircraft, it was designed with straight wings, thus was quickly outclassed by a new generation of swept-wing fighters, such as the Soviet's MiG-15. This led to the F-80 being rapidly replaced in the air superiority role by the transonic-capable North American F-86 Sabre. The final American F-80s were withdrawn in 1959; the Chilean Air Force, the last operator of the type, retired its aircraft during 1974.

Several derivatives of the P-80 were produced, such as the Lockheed F-94 Starfire, a twin-seat, all-weather interceptor that was used during the Korean War. Another derivative was the closely related Lockheed T-33 Shooting Star, an early jet trainer that remained in service with both the USAF and USN well into the 1980s, and a handful of examples were still operational into the 21st century.

== Design and development ==
=== Background ===
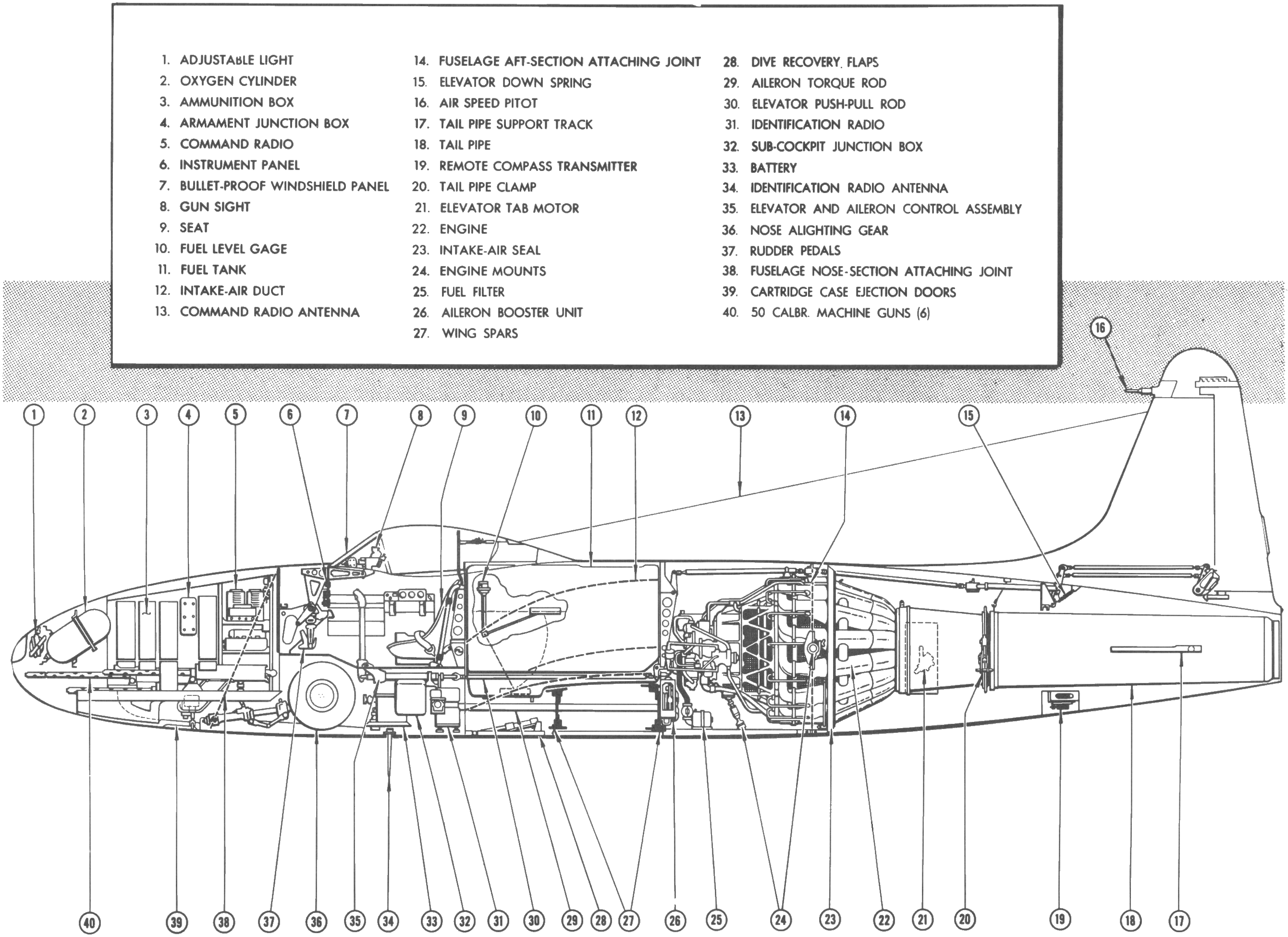
A cross-section of the aircraft with labeled parts

Lockheed was the first American aircraft company to start work on a jet-powered aircraft, having worked on the L-133 design study back in 1939. The L-133 was progressively developed into a more advanced design that included numerous futuristic features, such as canard forewings and a blended wing body; however, when Lockheed presented the design to the USAAF, it was rejected as being technologically unfeasible. Instead, the USAAF opted to concentrate its resources on the development of the much less radical Bell P-59 Airacomet, which made its first flight in October 1942. Flight testing revealed that the P-59's performance was only marginally superior to current piston-engined fighters. While Bell performed preliminary work to revise the P-59 with a low wing and a single fuselage-mounted engine, which was given the designation XP-59B; Bell's factory had become swamped with other projects, thus the USAAF opted to transfer the project to Lockheed.

The impetus for development of the P-80 was the discovery by Allied intelligence of the Me 262 in spring 1943, which had made only test flights of its own first quartet (the V1 through V4 airframes) of design prototypes at that time, all fitted with retracting tailwheel landing gear. After receiving documents and blueprints comprising years of British jet aircraft research, the commanding general of the USAAF, Henry H. Arnold, believed an airframe developed to accept the British-made Halford H-1 B "Goblin" jet engine could provide the superior performance to match the new German jets, and the Materiel Command's Wright Field research and development division tasked Lockheed to design the aircraft based on its experience with the L-133. Concept work began on the XP-80 in May 1943. Since the British turbojet was not yet delivered, Lockheed obtained its blueprint dimensions from Bell as ordered by the USAAF. Lockheed's team of 128 engineers was led by Clarence L. "Kelly" Johnson in a makeshift building used for the design and assembly of the prototype. The building was remote and secure, built from pallets and packing crates around an existing shack, the whole of which was covered by a rented circus tent; this tent area became known as Skunk Works—the first explicit use of the term to refer to an elite engineering project.

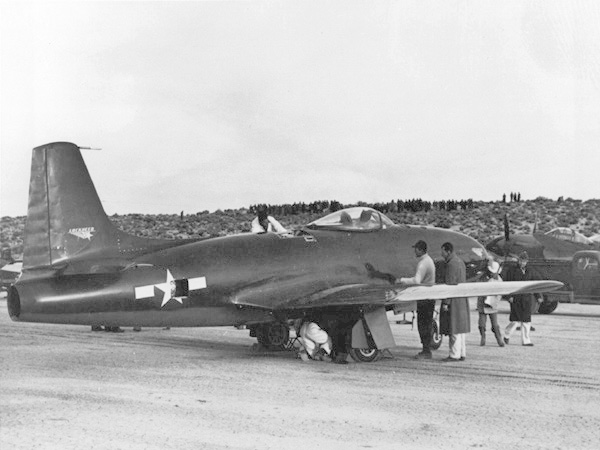
The original XP-80 prototype Lulu-Belle

With the Germans and British clearly far ahead in development, Lockheed was pressed to develop a comparable jet as quickly as possible. Kelly Johnson submitted a design proposal in mid-June and promised that the prototype would be completed in 180 days. By the end of day 19, a full-scale wooden mock-up of the aircraft had been completed. By the end of day 139, the first prototype had been completed and was ready for engine tests, although its delivery was briefly delayed by the team having no method of removing it from the assembly building short of its partial demolition. On 8 January 1944, it was delivered to Muroc Army Airfield for its maiden flight.

The project was so secret that only five of the more than 130 people working on it knew that they were developing a jet aircraft, and the British engineer who delivered the Halford H1 engine was detained by the police because Lockheed officials could not vouch for him. After the engine had been mated to the airframe, foreign object damage during the first run-up destroyed the engine. The British engineer who had delivered the engine had warned Lockheed that the skin of the inlet ducts was too thin, but the American engineers had ignored this warning, leading to both ducts collapsing and being sucked into the engine when it ran at full throttle. This delayed the first flight until a second engine (the only other existing) could be delivered from Britain, de Havilland generously donating the engine intended for the prototype Vampire.

The XP-80 featured a conventional, all-metal airframe that was provisioned with a slim low wing and tricycle landing gear. Common to the majority of early jets designed during World War II—and before the Allies captured German research data that confirmed the speed advantages of the swept wing—the XP-80 possessed straight wings, similar to previous propeller-driven fighters. The pilot was provisioned with a pressurized cockpit that was covered by a bubble canopy and provisioned with relatively simplistic instrumentation.

The P-80 was the first operational jet fighter to have its engine buried in the fuselage, a format that had been previously used in the pioneering German Heinkel He 178 V1 of 1939, as well as the British Gloster E.28/39 jet demonstrator of 1941. Other early jet aircraft were typically powered by a pair of engines due to their limited power output, and these were mounted in external nacelles for ease of maintenance. The advent of more powerful British jet engines made the adoption of a single, fuselage-mounted engine configuration possible. The XP-80 was also the first aircraft to be fitted with tip tanks; these actually lowered overall drag by reducing vortices at the wing tips, while also improving the aircraft's roll response and bolstered the wing's spanwise loading.

=== Into flight ===
The first prototype (44-83020) was nicknamed Lulu-Belle (also known as "the Green Hornet" because of its paint scheme). Powered by the replacement Halford H1 taken from the prototype de Havilland Vampire jet fighter, (Note: The Vampire's first flight was delayed until 20 September 1943 as a result) it first flew on 8 January 1944, with Lockheed test pilot Milo Burcham at the controls. Following this flight, Johnson said, "It was a magnificent demonstration, our plane was a success – such a complete success that it had overcome the temporary advantage the Germans had gained from years of preliminary development on jet planes." The donated British jet engine and program data had no doubt proved invaluable. In test flights, the XP-80 eventually reached a top speed of 502 mph (808 km/h; 436 kn) at 20,480 ft (6,240 m), making it the first turbojet-powered USAAF aircraft to exceed 500 mph (800 km/h) in level flight, following the August 1944 record flight of 504 mph (811 km/h; 438 kn) by a special high-speed variant of the Republic P-47 Thunderbolt. Contemporary pilots, when transitioning to pioneering jets like the P-80, were unused to flying at high speed without a loud reciprocating engine and had to learn to rely on the airspeed indicator.

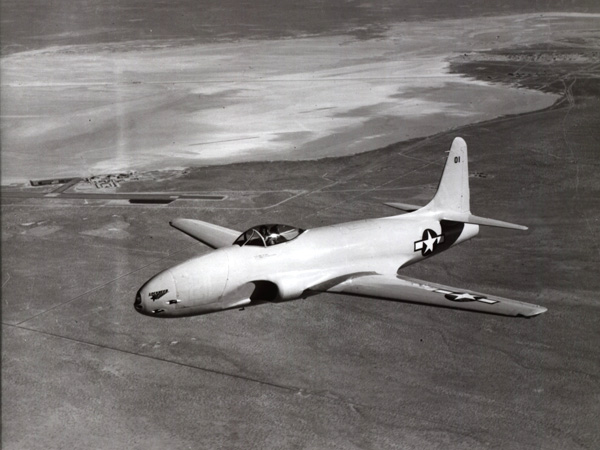
XP-80A Gray Ghost in flight

The second prototype, designated XP-80A, was designed for the larger General Electric I-40 engine (an improved J31, later produced by Allison as the J33). Two aircraft (44-83021 and 44-83022) were built; 44-83021 was nicknamed the Gray Ghost after its "pearl gray" paint scheme, while 83022, left unpainted for comparison of flight characteristics, became known as the Silver Ghost. The XP-80A's first test flight was unimpressive, but most of the problems with the design were soon addressed and corrected in the test program. Initial opinions of the XP-80A were not positive, with Lockheed Chief Engineering Test Pilot Milo Burcham commenting that an aircraft he very much enjoyed (powered by the Halford engine) had now become a "dog". The XP-80As were primarily testbeds for larger, more powerful engines and air-intake design, so consequently they were larger and 25% heavier than the XP-80.

The P-80 testing program proved to be very dangerous. Burcham was killed on 20 October 1944 while flying the third YP-80A, 44–83025. The Gray Ghost was lost on a test flight on 20 March 1945, although pilot Tony LeVier escaped. Newly promoted to chief engineering test pilot to replace Burcham, LeVier bailed out when one of the engine's turbine blades broke, causing structural failure in the aircraft's tail. LeVier landed hard and broke his back, but returned to the test program after six months of recovery. The top-scoring World War II USAAF ace, Major Richard Bong, was also killed on an acceptance flight of a production P-80 in the United States on 6 August 1945. Both Burcham and Bong had crashed as a result of main fuel pump failure. Burcham's death was the result of a failure to brief him on a newly installed emergency fuel pump backup system, but the investigation of Bong's crash found that he had apparently forgotten to switch on this pump, which could have prevented the accident. He bailed out when the aircraft rolled inverted, but was too close to the ground for his parachute to deploy.

After Bong's death, both the USAAF and Lockheed wanted to prove the reliability of the P-80. Robert E. Thacker from the Flight Test Division at Wright Field was ordered to select three other pilots, pick up five P-80s from Lockheed, fly them to Muroc Army Airbase, and fly each airplane there for 500 hours. Thacker tapped Chuck Yeager and two other pilots; they put 500 hours on each airplane without further incident.

Despite this, the P-80 was recorded as having the highest accident rate of any fighter operated by the USAAF in 1946, and limited pilot experience was an identified contributing factor. USAAF promptly concluded that pilots often struggled with the transition from piston-powered aircraft to jet propulsion, such as underestimating the slower response to throttle changes and showing poor speed awareness. In response, the development of a dedicated jet-powered trainer was started; it was directly derived from the P-80 by extending an otherwise-standard airframe by an additional four feet and six inches to accommodate a second seat for the instructor. The resulting aircraft, designated T-33 Shooting Star, was widely used in the training of as many as quarter of a million pilots during its service life.

During August 1945, the P-80 actively was claimed to be the fastest aircraft in the world. However, when the USAAF formally compared the P-80 and Me 262 shortly after the conflict, it concluded: "Despite a difference in gross weight of nearly 2,000 lb (900 kg), the Me 262 was superior to the P-80 in acceleration, speed, and approximately the same in climb performance. The Me 262 apparently has a higher critical Mach number (the Me 262A's was M 0.86), from a drag standpoint, than any current Army Air Force fighter."

== Operational history ==
=== USAAF service ===
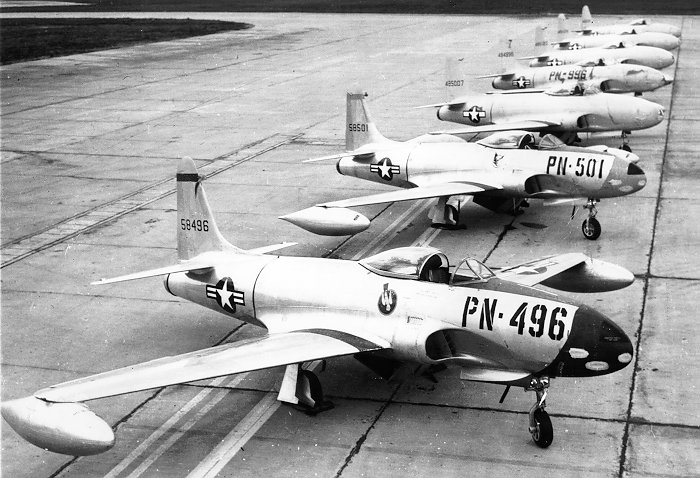
Operational P-80Bs at Langley AFB

The Shooting Star began to enter service in late 1944 with 12 preproduction YP-80As, one of which was destroyed in the accident in which Burcham was killed. A 13th YP-80A was modified to the sole F-14 photoreconnaissance model; it was lost in a December crash.

Four aircraft were sent to Europe for operational testing (demonstration, familiarization, and possible interception roles), two to England and two to the 1st Fighter Group at Lesina Airfield, Italy, but when test pilot Major Frederic Borsodi was killed in a crash caused by an engine fire while demonstrating a YP-80A (44-83026) at RAF Burtonwood, Lancashire, England, on 28 January 1945, the YP-80A was temporarily grounded. Before World War II ended, however, two preproduction YP-80A aircraft saw limited service in Italy with the USAAF, flying reconnaissance missions during February and March 1945. Because of delays in the delivery of production aircraft, the P-80 saw no actual combat during the conflict.

The initial production order for 1,000 P-80As was received after USAAF acceptance in February 1945. A total of 83 P-80s had been delivered by the end of July 1945 and 45 were assigned to the 412th Fighter Group (later redesignated the 1st Fighter Group) at Muroc Army Air Field. Shortly after the end of the end of the conflict, production of the P-80 was sharply curtailed, with the wartime plans for 5,000 aircraft being reduced to 2,000 aircraft at a unit cost that was a little under $100,000 each. By spring 1946, the USAAF was operating 301 P-80s, almost all of which were based in the continental United States.

On 27 January 1946, Colonel William H. Councill flew a P-80 nonstop across the U.S. to make the first transcontinental jet flight. He completed the 2,457 miles (3,954 km) run between Long Beach and New York in 4:13:26 hr at an average speed of 584 mph (507 kn; 940 km/h), aided by the upper-level westerly winds, to set a Fédération Aéronautique Internationale record. The P-80B prototype, modified as a racer and designated P-80R, was piloted by Colonel Albert Boyd to a world airspeed record of 623.73 mph (1,004.2 km/h) on 19 June 1947.

A total of 1,714 single-seat F-80A, F-80B, F-80C, and RF-80s was manufactured by the end of production in 1950, of which 927 were F-80Cs (including 129 operational F-80As upgraded to F-80C-11-LO standards). However, the two-seat TF-80C, first flown on 22 March 1948, became the basis for the T-33 trainer, of which 6,557 were produced.

=== U.S. Air Force service ===
Production of the P-80C was started in 1948; on 11 June, the newly formed United States Air Force (USAF) redesignated the type as F-80C. The 1st and 56th Fighter Groups of the USAF's Strategic Air Command operated the F-80 between 1946 and 1948. The first P-80s to serve in Europe joined the 55th Fighter Group (later redesignated the 31st FG) at Giebelstadt, Germany, in 1946, remaining 18 months. When the Soviet Union blockaded Berlin, a squadron of the 56th FG led by Colonel David C. Schilling made the first west-to-east Atlantic crossing by single-engined jets in July, flying to Germany for 45 days in Operation Fox Able I. (Note: Royal Air Force jets had made the first crossing of the Atlantic in the reverse direction two weeks earlier.) Replaced by the newly F-80-equipped 36th Fighter Group at Fürstenfeldbruck, the 56th FG conducted Fox Able II in May 1949. That same year F-80s first equipped the 51st Fighter Group, based in Japan.

The 4th (Langley Air Force Base, Virginia), 81st (Kirtland Air Force Base, New Mexico), and 57th (Elmendorf Air Force Base, Alaska) Fighter Groups all acquired F-80s in 1948, as did interceptor squadrons of the Air Defense Command. The first Air National Guard unit to fly the F-80C was the 196th FS of the California ANG in June 1947.

During October 1951, despite the US being actively engaged in the Korean War, the USAF began the withdrawal of both the F-80A and F-80B.

=== U.S. Navy service ===
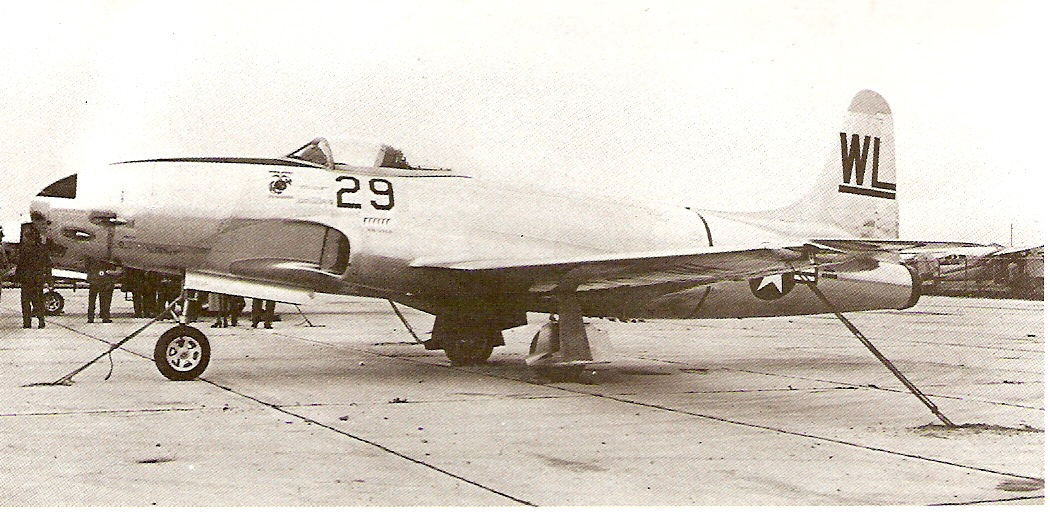
TO-1 Shooting Star of VMF-311

Several P-80A Shooting Stars (Note: Aviation historian Norman Polmar states three, but Joseph Baugher lists serial and bureau numbers for four: 44-85000 and −85005 became 29667 and 29668 with 44-85235 and 45-8557 becoming 29689 and 29690.) were transferred to the United States Navy beginning 29 June 1945, retaining their P-80 designations. At Naval Air Station Patuxent River, one Navy P-80 was modified with required add-ons, such as an arrestor hook, and loaded aboard the aircraft carrier USS Franklin D. Roosevelt at Norfolk, Virginia, on 31 October 1946. The following day the aircraft made four deck-run takeoffs and two catapult launches, with five arrested landings, flown by Marine Major Marion Carl. A second series of trials was held on 11 November.

The U.S. Navy had already begun procuring its own jet aircraft, but the slow pace of delivery was causing retention problems among pilots, particularly those of the Marines who were still flying Vought F4U Corsairs. To increase land-based jet-transition training in the late 1940s, 50 F-80Cs were transferred to the U.S. Navy from the U.S. Air Force in 1949 as jet trainers. Designated TO-1 by the Navy (changed to TV-1 in 1950), 25 were based at Naval Air Station North Island, California, with VF-52, and 16 assigned to the Marine Corps, equipping VMF-311 at Marine Corps Air Station El Toro. These aircraft were eventually sent to reserve units. The success of these aircraft led to the procurement by the Navy of 698 T-33 Shooting Stars (as the TO-2/TV-2) to provide a two-seat aircraft for the training role. Lockheed went on to develop a carrier-capable version, the T2V SeaStar, which went into service in 1957.

=== Korean War ===
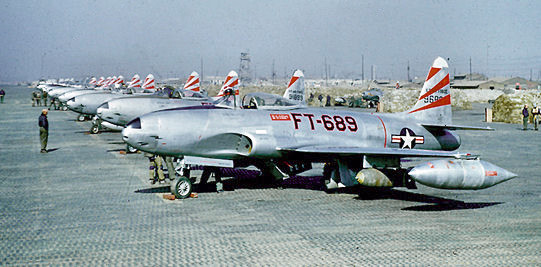
F-80Cs of the 8th Fighter-Bomber Group in Korea, 1950

The F-80 first saw combat service in the Korean War, and were among the first aircraft to be involved in jet-versus-jet combat. The Americans used the F-80C fighter and RF-80 photo-reconnaissance variants over Korea; at the start of the conflict, the F-80 comprised roughly half of the USAF's fighter strength. The F-80 flew both air-to-air and air-to-ground sorties, claiming several aerial victories against North Korean Yak-9s and Il-10s.

On 1 November 1950, a Russian MiG-15 pilot, Lieutenant Semyon F. Khominich, became the first pilot in history to be credited with a jet-versus-jet aerial kill after he claimed to have shot down an F-80. According to the Americans, the F-80 was downed by flak. One week later, on 8 November, the first American claim for a jet-versus-jet aerial kill was made when Lieutenant Russell J. Brown, flying an F-80, reported that he downed a MiG-15. Soviet records claim that no MiGs were lost that day and that their pilot, Senior Lieutenant Kharitonov, survived by pulling out of a dive at low altitude.

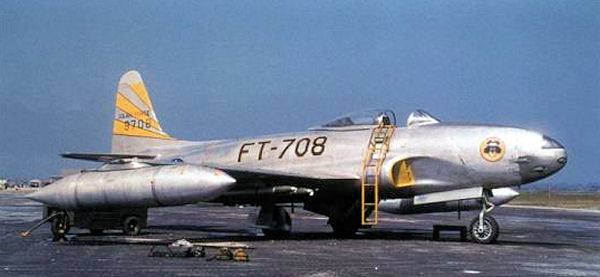
F-80C Shooting Star of the 8th Fighter Bomber Group in Korea

Despite initial claims of success, the speed of the straight-wing F-80s was inferior to the 668 mph (1075 km/h) MiGs. The MiGs incorporated German research showing that swept wings delayed the onset of compressibility problems, and enabled speeds closer to the speed of sound. F-80s were soon replaced in the air superiority role by the North American F-86 Sabre, which had been delayed to also incorporate swept wings into an improved straight-winged naval FJ-1 Fury. However, F-80 pilots still destroyed a total of six MiG-15s in aerial combat. When sufficient Sabres were in operation, the F-80 flew exclusively ground-attack missions, and were also used for advanced flight training duties and air defense in Japan. By the end of hostilities, and the only F-80s still flying in Korea were photo-reconnaissance variants.

F-80Cs equipped 10 USAF squadrons in Korea:

- 8th Fighter-Bomber Wing (35th, 36th, and 80th Fighter-Bomber Squadrons), based at Suwon Air Base, was the longest-serving F-80 unit in Korea. It began missions from Japan in June 1950 and continued to fly the Shooting Star until May 1953, when it converted to F-86 Sabres.
- 49th Fighter-Bomber Group (7th, 8th, and 9th FBS) deployed to Taegu AB (K-2), Korea, from Japan in September 1950 and continued fighter-bomber missions in the F-80C until June 1951, when it converted to the F-84 Thunderjet.
- 51st Fighter-Interceptor Wing (16th and 25th FIS) operated F-80Cs from Kimpo AB (K-14) and Japan from September 1950 to November 1951 when it transitioned to F-86s.
- 35th Fighter-Interceptor Group and two squadrons, the 39th and 40th FIS, went to Pohang, Korea in July 1950, but converted to the P-51 Mustang before the end of the year.

One RF-80A unit operated in the Korean War:

- 8th Tactical Reconnaissance Squadron, later redesignated 15th TRS, served from 27 June 1950 at Itazuke, Japan, Taegu (K-2), and Kimpo (K-14), South Korea, until after the armistice. The squadron also utilized a few converted RF-80Cs and RF-86s.

During the Korean War, 368 F-80s were lost, including 277 in combat missions and 91 non-combat losses Of the 277 F-80s lost in operations (approximately 30% of the existing inventory), 113 were lost to ground fire, 14 to enemy aircraft, 54 to "unknown causes" and 96 were "other losses". F-80s are credited by the USAF with destroying 17 aircraft in air-to-air combat and 24 on the ground. Major Charles J. Loring Jr. was posthumously awarded the Medal of Honor for his actions while flying an F-80 with the 80th Fighter-Bomber Squadron, 8th Fighter-Bomber Wing on 22 November 1952.

== Variants ==
=== P-80/F-80 ===
1714 production aircraft were delivered to the Air Force prior to any conversions or redesignations, with their original block numbers.

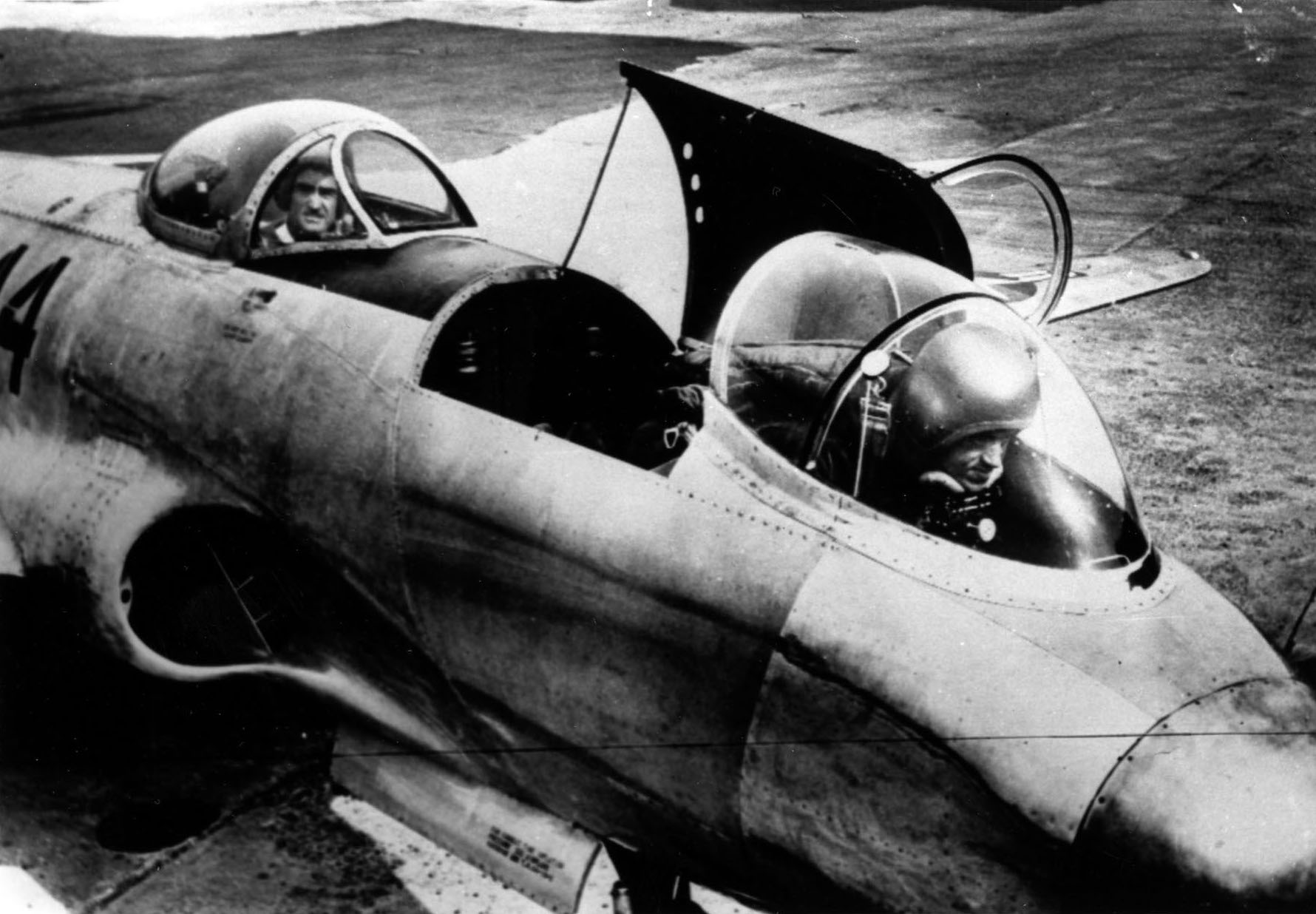
EF-80 prone pilot test aircraft

XP-80
Prototype powered by a de Havilland-built Halford H.1B turbojet and first flown 8 January 1944, one built.
XP-80A
Production prototype variant powered by a General Electric I-40 turbojet, increased span and length but wing area reduced, two built.
YP-80A
12 pre-production aircraft. One aircraft, 44-83027, lent to Rolls-Royce Limited and used for development of the Nene engine.
XF-14
One built from YP-80A order (44-83024), lost in midair collision with B-25 Mitchell chase plane on 6 December 1944; USAAF photo reconnaissance prototype.
P-80A
344 block 1-LO aircraft; 180 block 5-LO aircraft. Block 5 and all subsequent Shooting Stars were natural metal finish. Fitted with 225 US gal (187 imp gal; 850 L) tiptanks.
F-80A
USAF designation of P-80A.
EF-80
Modified to test "Prone Pilot" cockpit positions. (Note: See also Gloster Meteor F8 "Prone Pilot" for background on prone pilot experiments.)

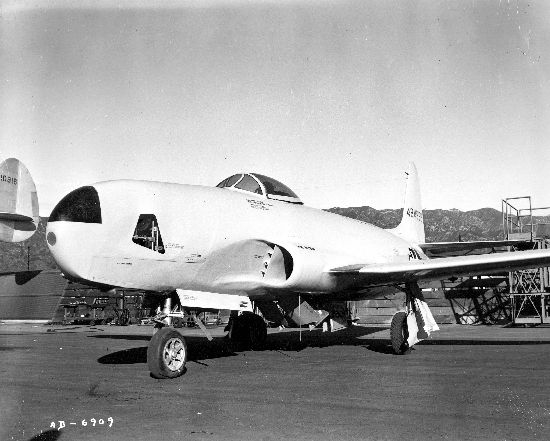
F-14A/FP-80A reconnaissance aircraft

F-14A
Unknown number of photo-reconnaissance conversions from P-80A, all redesignated FP-80A.
XFP-80A
Modified P-80A 44–85201 with hinged nose for camera equipment.

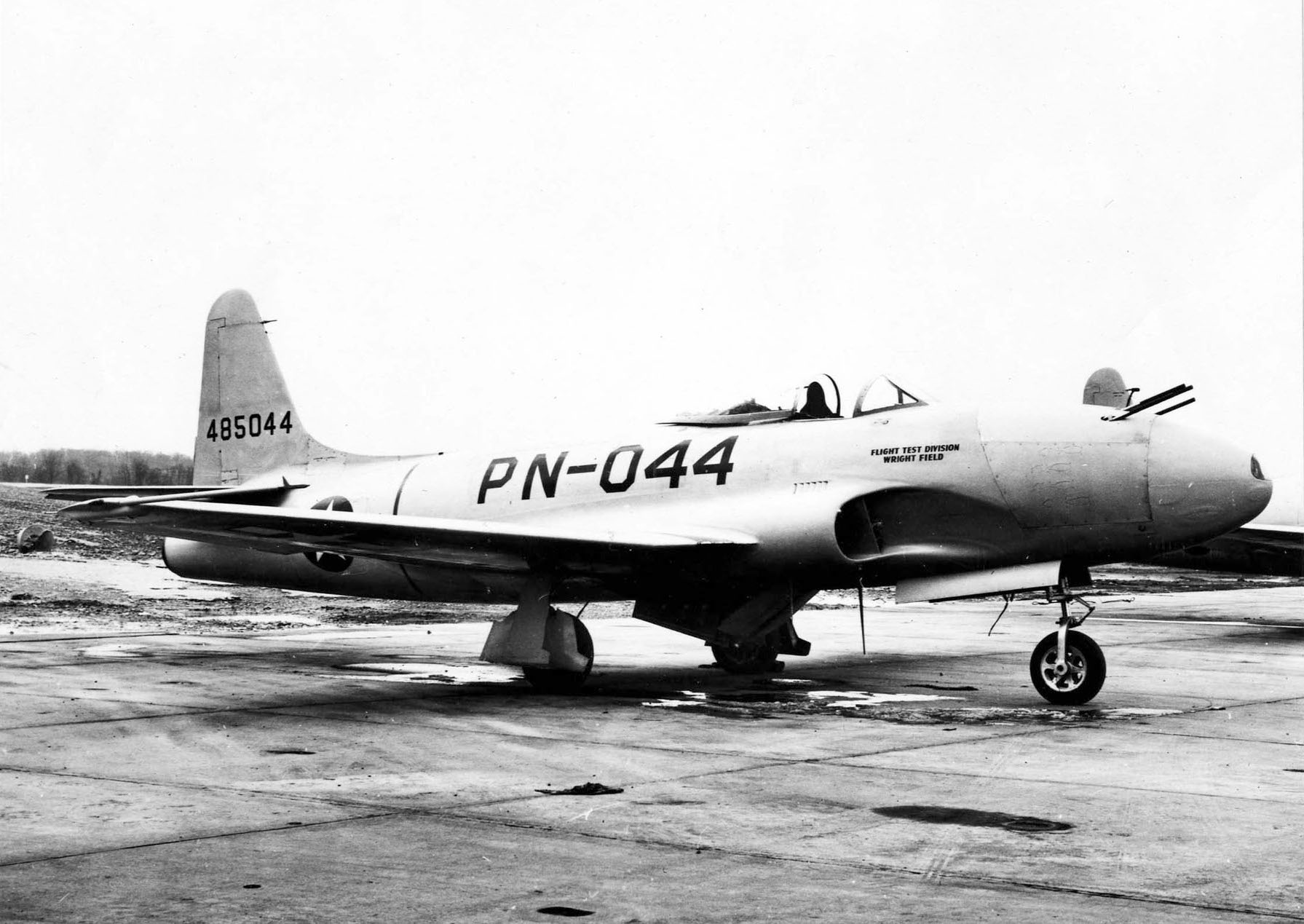
F-80A test aircraft (s/n 44-85044) with twin 0.5 in (12.7 mm) machine guns in oblique mount, similar to World War II German Schräge Musik, to study the ability to attack Soviet bombers from below

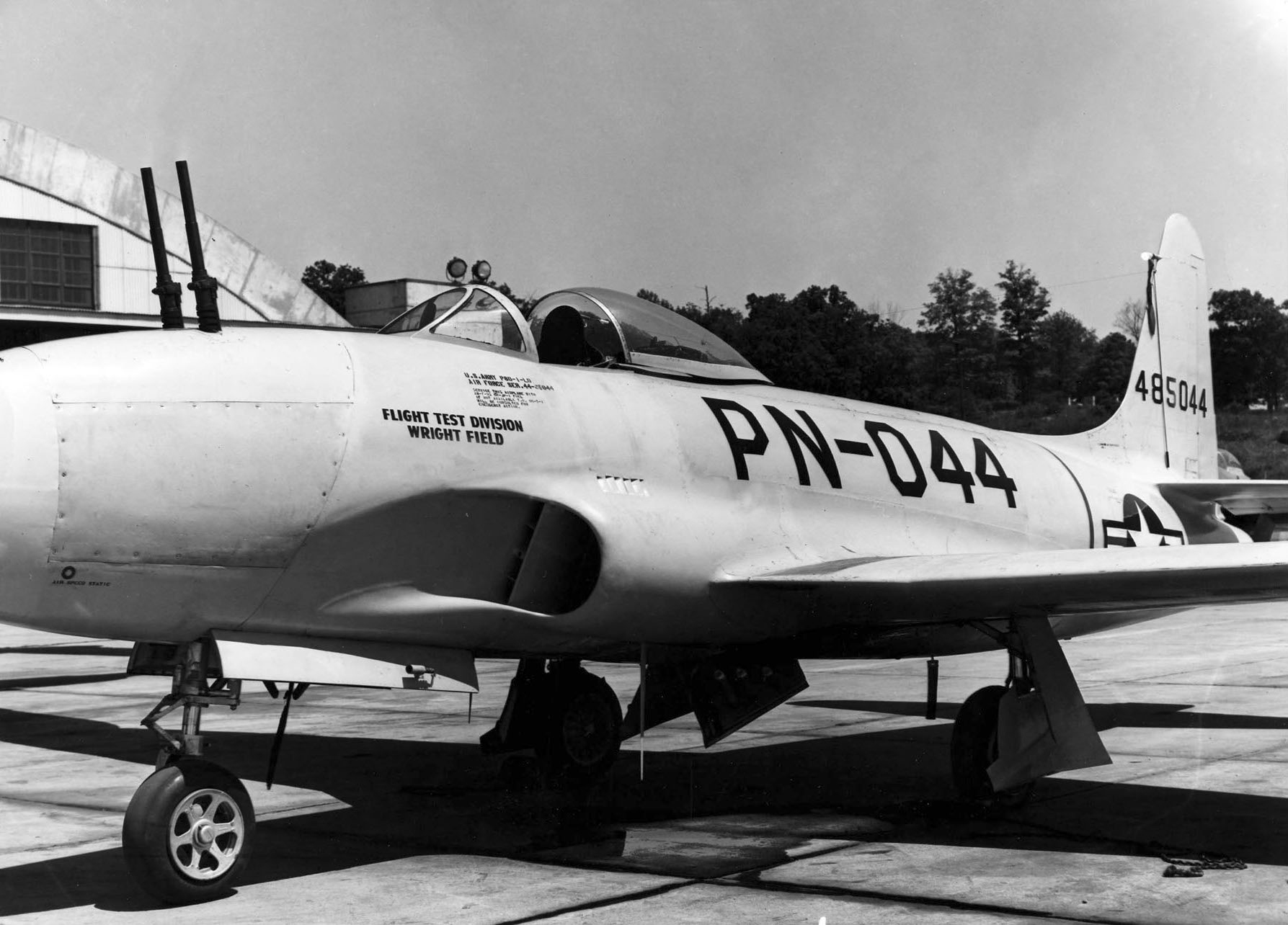
F-80 with Schräge Musik configuration at full elevation

FP-80A
152 block 15-LO; operational photo reconnaissance aircraft.
RF-80A
USAF designation of FP-80A, 66 operational F-80A's modified to RF-80A standard.
ERF-80A
Modified P-80A 44–85042 with experimental nose contour.
XP-80B
Reconfigured P-80A, improved J-33 engine, one built as prototype for P-80B
P-80B
209 block 1-LO; 31 block 5-LO; first model fitted with an ejection seat (retrofitted into -As); delivered between March 1947 and March 1948. The P-80B also featured underwing rocket launchers. Thinner wings with thicker skin, a stronger nose bulkhead to support 6 x M3 .50 in machine guns, stainless steel armored compartment for the newer J33-21, cockpit cooling, and canopy anti-frosting systems. 240 produced.
F-80B
USAF designation of P-80B.
P-80R
Modification of XP-80B to racer.
P-80C
162 block 1-LO; 75 block 5-LO; 561 block 10-LO
F-80C
USAF designation of P-80C; 128 F-80A modified to F-80C-11-LO with J-33-A-35 engine and ejection seat installed; fitted with 260 US gal (220 imp gal; 980 L) tiptanks; major P-80 production version.
RF-80C
70 modified F-80A and F-80C, and six modified RF-80A, to RF-80C and RF-80C-11, respectively; upgraded photo recon plane.
DF-80A
Designation given to number of F-80As converted into drone directors.
QF-80A/QF-80C/QF-80F
Project Bad Boy F-80 conversions by Sperry Gyroscope to target drones. Q-8 was initially proposed as designation for the QF-80.
TP-80C
First designation for TF-80C trainer prototype.
TF-80C
Prototype for T-33 (48-0356).
TO-1/TV-1
U.S. Navy variant of F-80C; 49 block 1-LO and one block 5-LO aircraft transferred to USN in 1949; 16 initially went to U.S. Marine Corps.

=== Derivatives ===
Lockheed T-33 Shooting Star

Lockheed also produced a two-seat trainer variant with a longer fuselage, the T-33, which remained in production until 1959 and was produced under license in Japan and Canada. The trainer was used by more than 20 countries. A total of 6,557 T-33s were built and some are still flying.

Lockheed F-94 Starfire

Two TF-80Cs were modified as prototypes for the F-94 Starfire, an all-weather fighter produced in three variants.

== Former operators ==
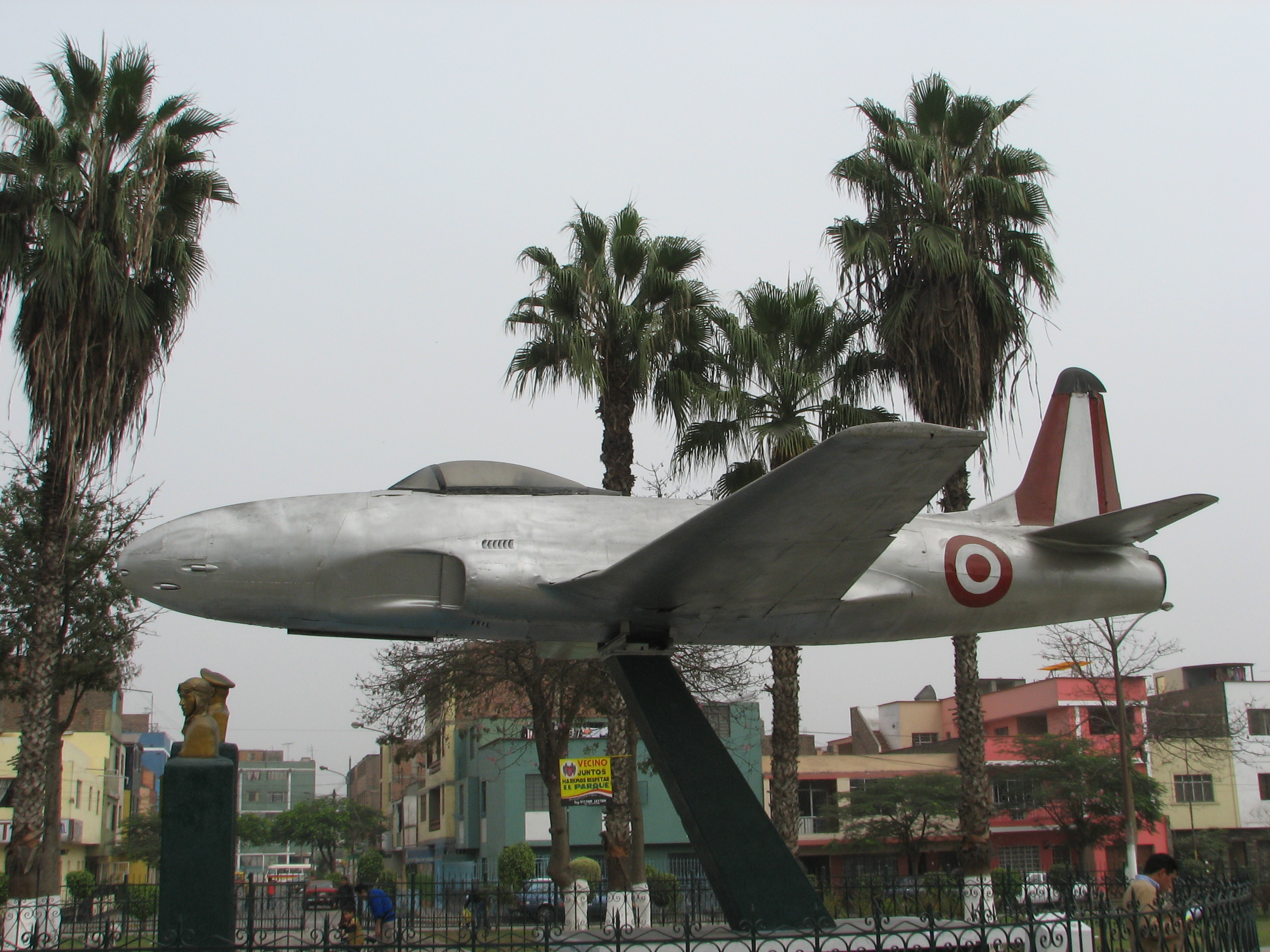
A Peruvian F-80C preserved in a Lima park

Brazil
33 F-80Cs delivered starting in 1958, withdrawn from service in 1973.
Chile
around 30 F-80Cs delivered from 1958 on, last ones retired from service in 1974.
Colombia
25 F-80Cs delivered starting in 1958, retired by 1966.
Ecuador
16 F-80Cs delivered between 1957 and 1960, six returned to the United States in 1965.
Peru
16 F-80Cs delivered starting in 1958, used by the 13th Fighter-Bomber Group until the type was phased out in 1973.
United States

- United States Air Force
- United States Navy, 1945 to 1970s

Uruguay
at least 18 F-80Cs delivered in 1958, withdrawn from use in 1972.

== Aircraft on display ==
=== Brazil ===
F-80C

- 49-0433 – Museu Aeroespacial in Rio de Janeiro, Brazil.

=== Chile ===
- 49-0787 – Museo Nacional Aeronáutico y del Espacio, Los Cerrillos Airport, Santiago, Chile.

=== Colombia ===
- FAC 2061 – Colombian Aerospace Museum, Tocancipá

=== United States ===
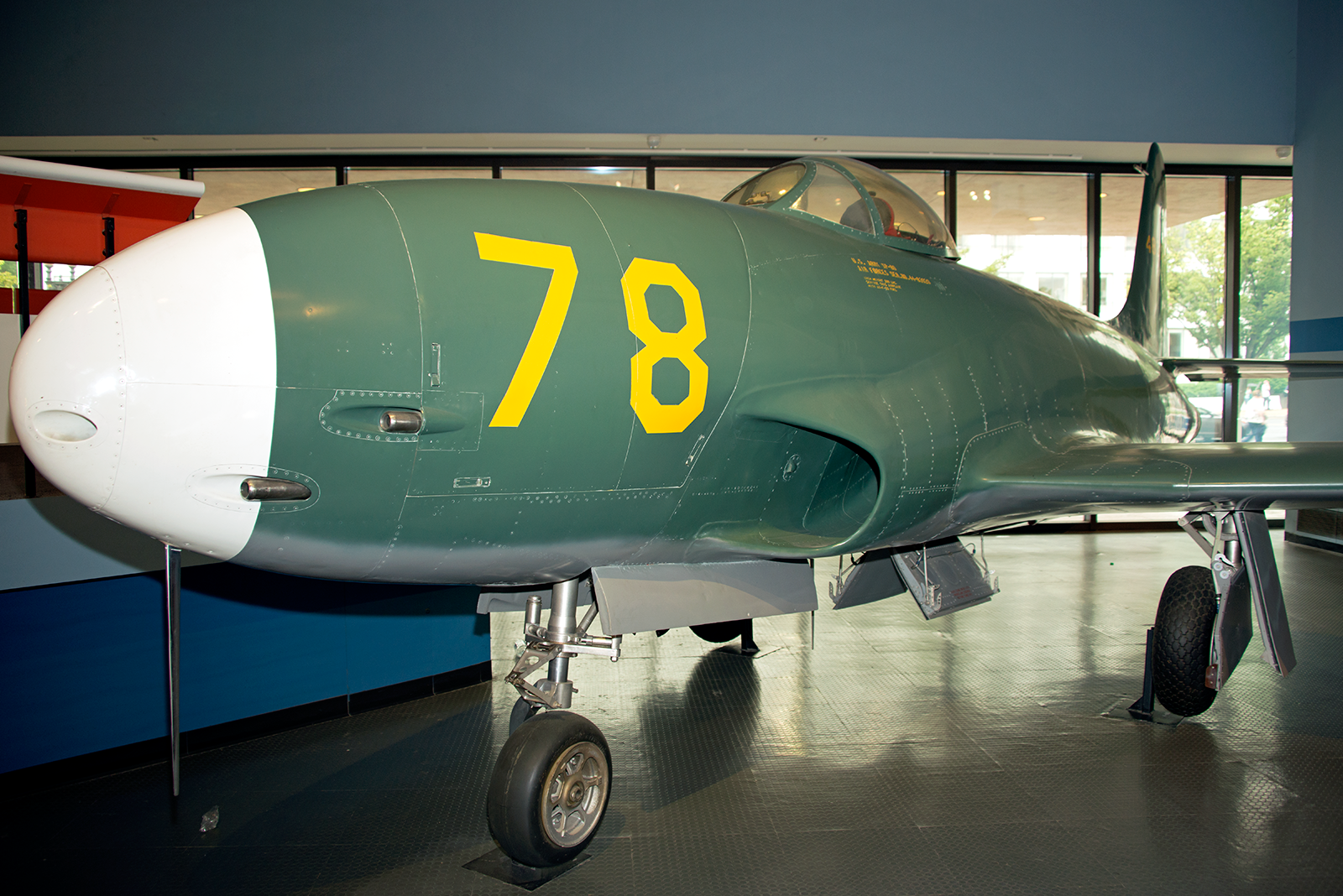
Lockheed XP-80 "Lulu-Belle" at the National Air and Space Museum, Washington, D.C.

XP-80

- 44-83020 (Lulu-Belle) – National Air and Space Museum in Washington, D.C.. First flown on 8 January 1944, it was restored right after the 1976 opening of the National Air and Space Museum and is still in their collection.

P-80A

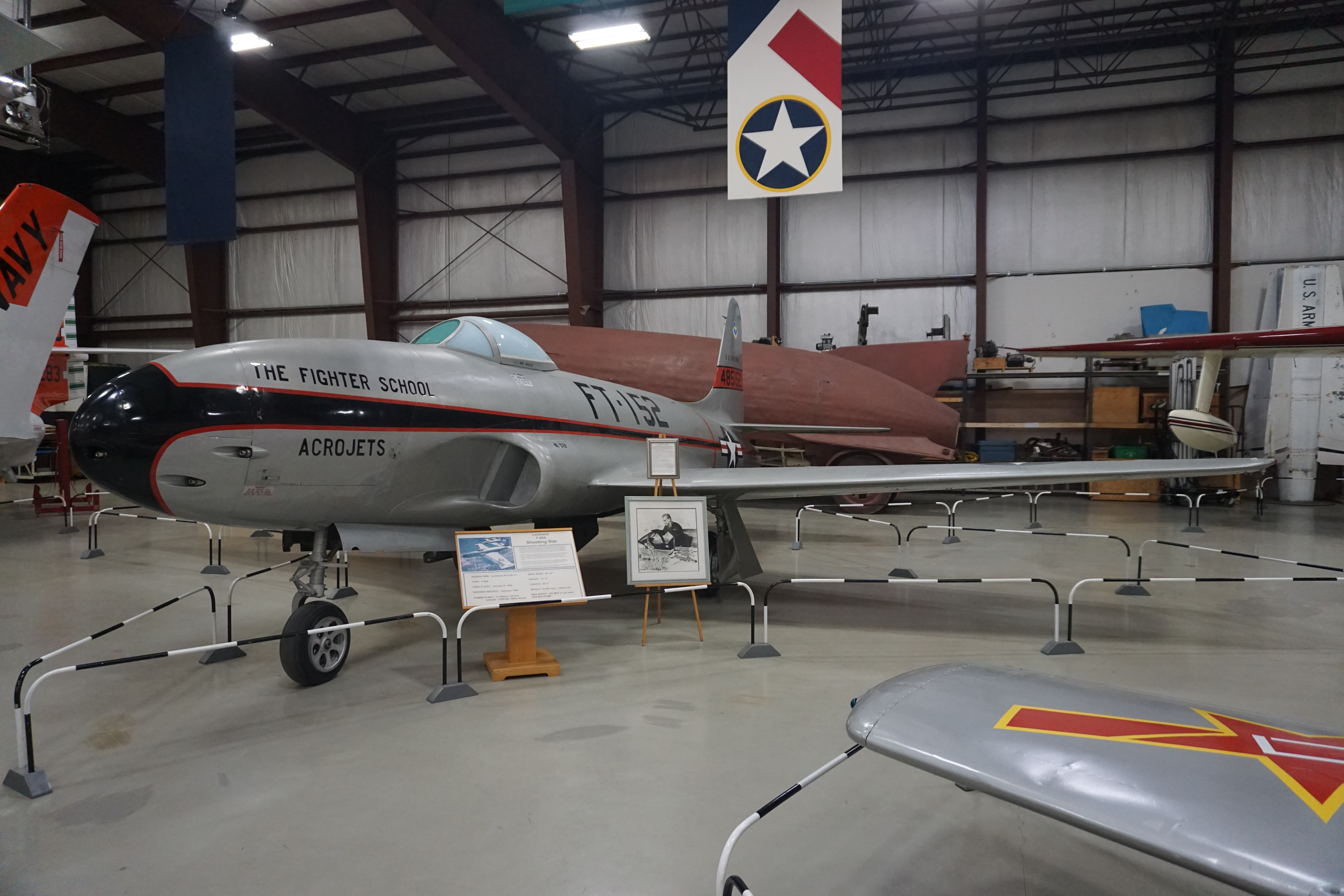
P-80A on display at the Air Zoo

- 44-84999 – Hill Aerospace Museum at Hill AFB, Utah. This airframe is a T-33A that has been modified and painted to resemble a P-80.
- 44-85123 – Air Force Flight Test Museum at Edwards Air Force Base in California. Currently undergoing restoration. This aircraft set transcontinental speed record in January 1946, closed circuit speed record in June 1946, and won the Thompson Trophy Race in September 1946. Was then used to test nose fairing and wing designs.
- 44-85125 (displayed as 44-85152) – Kalamazoo Air Zoo in Kalamazoo, Michigan.
- 44-85391 (front of fuselage) – Air Victory Museum, Medford, New Jersey.
- 44-85488 – Planes of Fame in Chino, California.

P-80B

- 45-8357 – Museum of Aviation at Robins Air Force Base, Warner Robins, Georgia.
- 45-8490 – Castle Air Museum at the former Castle Air Force Base in Atwater, California.
- 45-8501 – Kirtland AFB, Albuquerque, New Mexico.
- 45-8517 – Anna Jordan Park, Baton Rouge, Louisiana.
- 45-8612 – Pima Air & Space Museum adjacent to Davis-Monthan AFB in Tucson, Arizona.
- 45-8704 – Aerospace Museum of California at the former McClellan AFB in Sacramento, California.

P-80C

- 47-0171 – Iowa Gold Star Military Museum, Camp Dodge, Des Moines, Iowa.
- 47-0215 – Reflections of Freedom Air Park, McConnell AFB, Wichita, Kansas.
- 47-0221 – Redesignated US Navy TV-1 BuNo 33824 Wings of Freedom Aviation Museum, Horsham Township, Pennsylvania.
- 47-1837 – Redesignated USMC TO-1 BuNo 33840 at the Flying Leatherneck Aviation Museum at MCAS Miramar, San Diego, California.
- 47-1392 – Naval Air Station Joint Reserve Base Fort Worth, Fort Worth, Texas.
- 48-0868 – EAA Airventure Museum in Oshkosh, Wisconsin.
- 49-0432 (displayed as 49-417) – Air Force Armament Museum at Eglin AFB, Florida.
- 49-0696 – National Museum of the United States Air Force at Wright-Patterson AFB in Dayton, Ohio.
- 49-0710 – Mid-America Air Museum, Liberal, Kansas.
- 49-0719 – in storage awaiting restoration at Yanks Air Museum in Chino, California.
- 49-1853 – Veteran's Memorial Square, Holloman AFB in New Mexico.
- 49-1872 – Pueblo Weisbrod Aircraft Museum, Pueblo Memorial Airport, Pueblo, Colorado.

P-80R

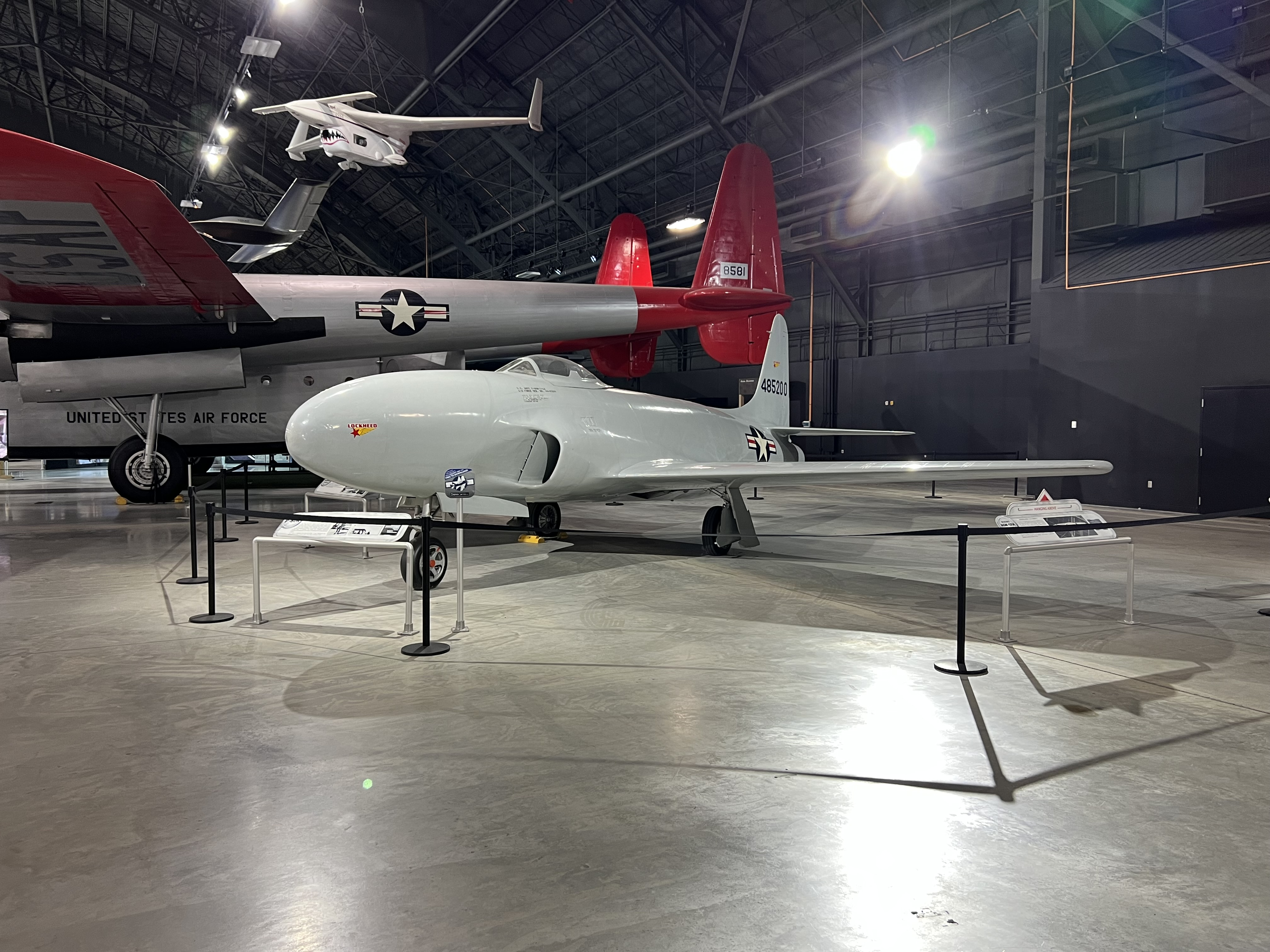
P-80R on display at the National Museum of the United States Air Force

- 44-85200 – National Museum of the United States Air Force at Wright-Patterson AFB in Dayton, Ohio. This aircraft was specially modified for racing by equipping it with a smaller canopy, a shorter wing, and redesigned air intakes. On 19 June 1947, it was flown by Colonel Albert Boyd to a new world speed record of 623.73 mph (1,004.2 km/h). The P-80R aircraft was shipped to the Museum from Griffiss Air Force Base in New York in October 1954.

=== Uruguay ===
F-80C

- 47-0205 (FAU213) – Museo de la aeronautica in Montevideo, Uruguay.

== Specifications (P-80C/F-80C) ==
3-view silhouette drawing of the Lockheed F-80C Shooting Star

Data from Quest for Performance, Lockheed Aircraft since 1913

General characteristics

- Crew: 1
- Length: 34 ft 5 in (10.49 m)
- Wingspan: 38 ft 9 in (11.81 m)
- Height: 11 ft 3 in (3.43 m)
- Wing area: 237.6 sq ft (22.07 m^{2})
- Aspect ratio: 6.37
- Airfoil: NACA 65-213
- Empty weight: 8,420 lb (3,819 kg)
- Gross weight: 12,200 lb (5,534 kg)
- Max takeoff weight: 16,856 lb (7,646 kg)
- Zero-lift drag coefficient: 0.0134
- Frontal area: 32 sq ft (3.0 m^{2})
- Powerplant: 1 × Allison J33-A-35 centrifugal compressor turbojet, 4,600 lbf (20 kN) thrust dry

5,400 lbf (24 kN) with water injection

Performance

- Maximum speed: 594 mph (956 km/h, 516 kn) at sea level
- Maximum speed: Mach 0.76
- Cruise speed: 439 mph (707 km/h, 381 kn)
- Range: 825 mi (1,328 km, 717 nmi)
- Ferry range: 1,380 mi (2,220 km, 1,200 nmi)
- Service ceiling: 46,800 ft (14,300 m)
- Rate of climb: 6,870 ft/min (34.9 m/s)
- Time to altitude: 20,000 ft (6,100 m) in five minutes and 30 seconds
- Lift-to-drag: 17.7
- Wing loading: 51.3 lb/sq ft (250 kg/m^{2})
- Thrust/weight: 0.364

0.435 with water injection.

Armament

- Guns: 6 × 0.50 in (12.7mm) M3 Browning machine guns (300 rpg)
- Rockets: 8 × 127 mm (5.00 in) HVAR unguided rockets
- Bombs: 2 × 1,000 lb (450 kg) bombs

== See also ==
Related development

- Lockheed T-33 Shooting Star
- Lockheed T2V SeaStar
- Lockheed F-94 Starfire

Aircraft of comparable role, configuration, and era

- Bell P-59 Airacomet – (United States)
- de Havilland Vampire – (United Kingdom)
- Gloster Meteor – (United Kingdom)
- Gloster Meteor F8 "Prone Pilot" – (United Kingdom)
- Hawker Hunter – (United Kingdom)
- Heinkel He 162 Volksjäger – (Nazi Germany)
- Heinkel He 280 – (Nazi Germany)
- Messerschmitt Me 262 – (German Reich)
- Mikoyan-Gurevich MiG-9 – (Soviet Union)
- Nakajima Kikka – (Empire of Japan)
- Saab 32 Lansen – (Sweden)
- Yakovlev Yak-23 – (Soviet Union)

Related lists

- List of military aircraft of the United States
- List of fighter aircraft
- List of jet aircraft of World War II
- List of Lockheed aircraft
