= Lockheed Altair =

1930s sports aircraft

Altair
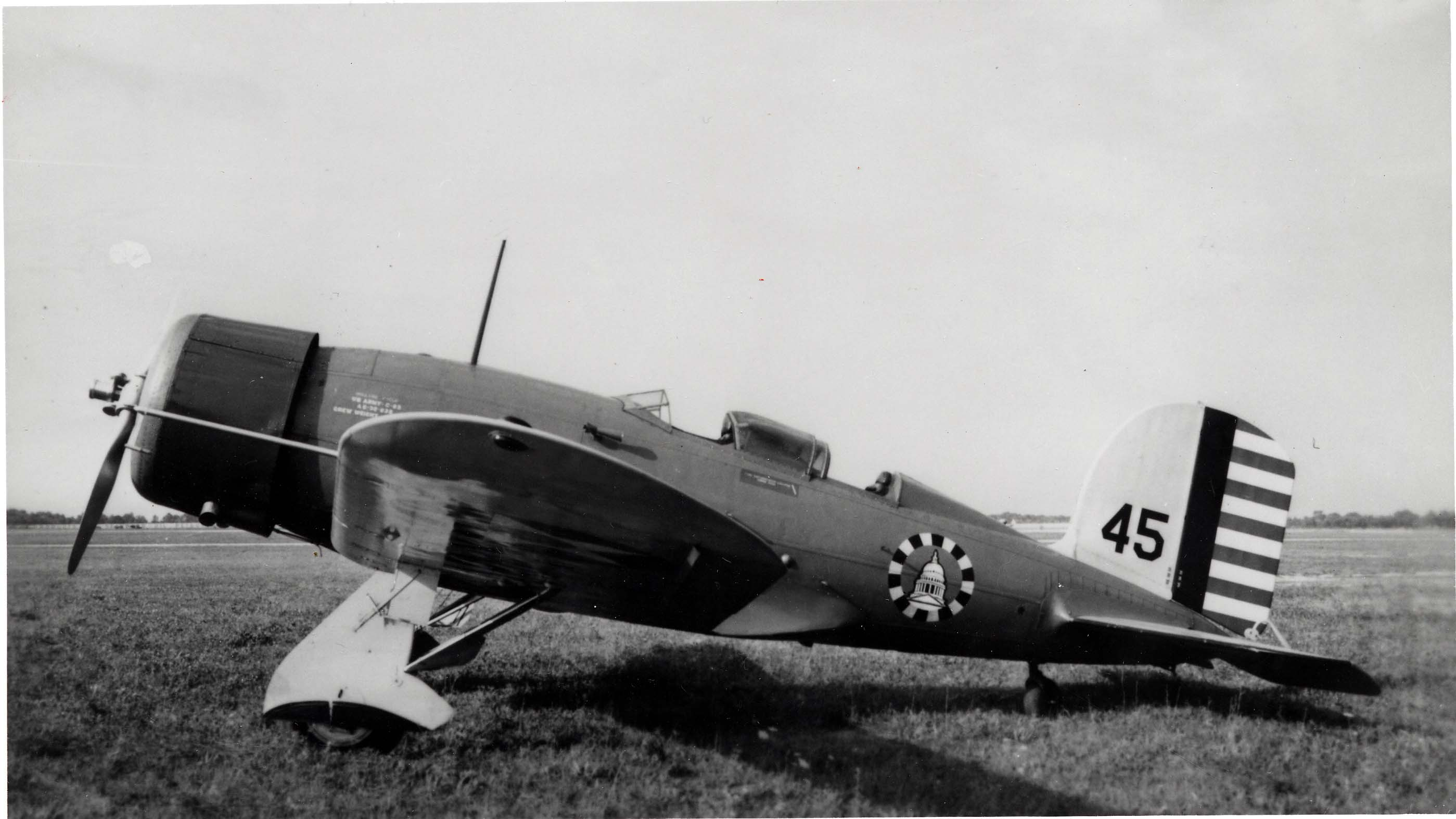
- The C-23, an Altair 8D purchased by the US Army Air Corps for use as a staff transport

General information
- Type: Civilian sport
- National origin: United States of America
- Manufacturer: Lockheed Aircraft Limited
- Number built: 11

History
- First flight: September 1930
- Developed from: Lockheed Sirius
- Developed into: Lockheed Orion

The Lockheed Altair was a single-engined sport aircraft produced by Lockheed Aircraft Limited in the 1930s. It was a development of the Lockheed Sirius with a retractable undercarriage, and was the first Lockheed aircraft and one of the first aircraft designs with a fully retractable undercarriage.

== Development and design ==
Lockheed designed an alternative wing fitted with a retractable undercarriage for the Lockheed Sirius as a result of a request from Charles Lindbergh, although Lindbergh in the end chose to buy a standard Sirius. The first Altair, converted from a Sirius, flew in September 1930. Like the Sirius, the Altair was a single-engined, low-winged monoplane of wooden construction. The undercarriage, which was operated by use of a hand crank, retracted inwards.

Four Altairs following the prototype were converted from examples of the Sirius, with another six Altairs built from scratch: three by Lockheed, two by the Detroit Aircraft Corporation, and one by AiRover. The AiRover Altair, dubbed The Flying Testbed, was powered by a Menasco Unitwin engine, which used two engines to drive a single shaft. The Unitwin was used in the Vega Starliner, which never went into production.

== Operational history ==
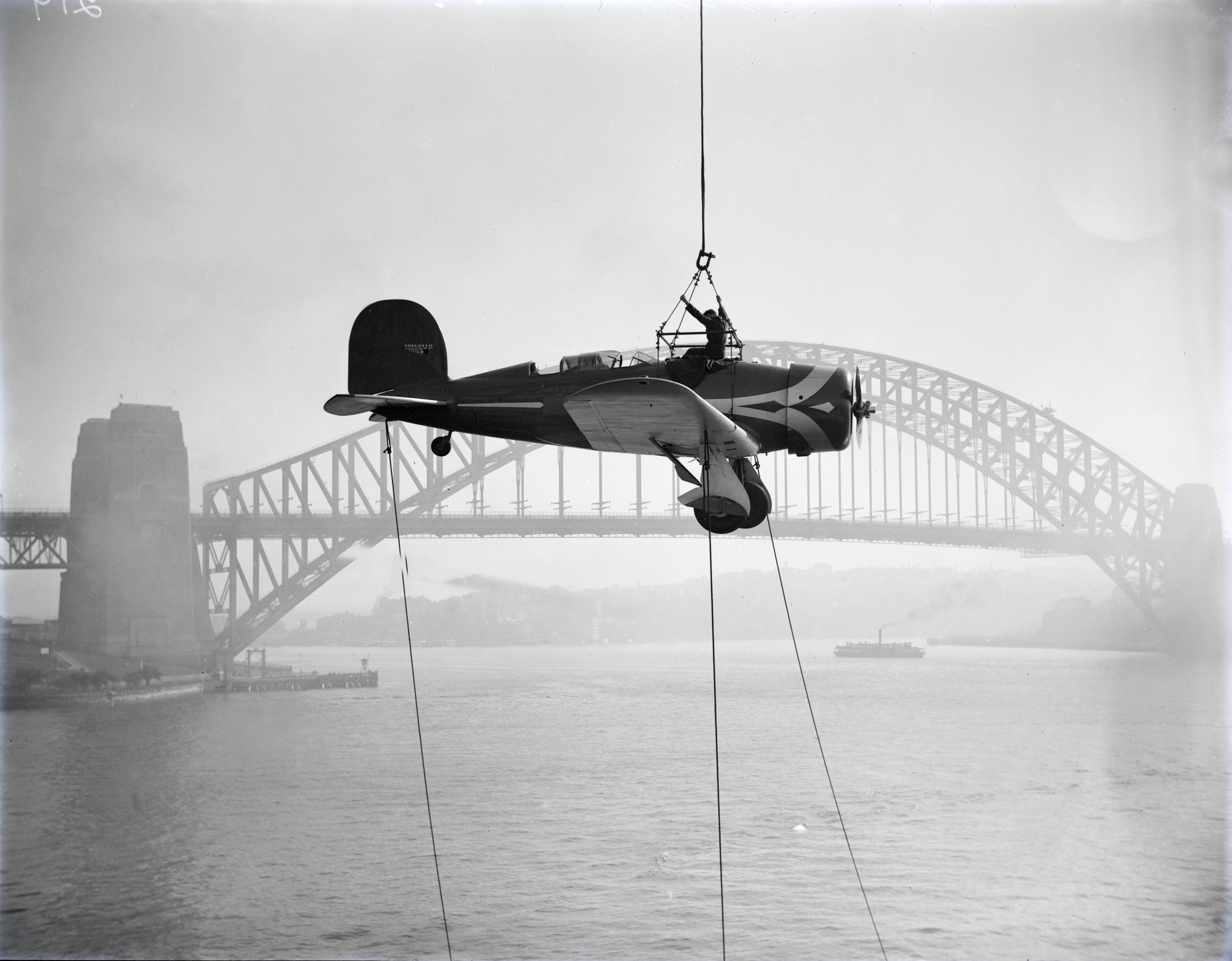
Charles Kingsford Smith's Lockheed Altair, Sydney, 1934

The prototype Altair was purchased by the United States Army Air Corps and designated Y1C-25, with a second Altair, fitted with a metal construction fuselage was also purchased by the Army as the Y1C-23 and used as a staff transport, as was a single similar aircraft operated by the US Navy as the XRO-1.

Altairs were used on a number of record-breaking long-range flights. Lady Southern Cross was used by Australian aviator Charles Kingsford Smith to carry out the first flight from Australia to the United States. The Lady Southern Cross departed Archerfield Airport on October 20, 1934, and arrived at Oakland, California on November 4. Kingsford Smith and his co-pilot Tommy Pethybridge disappeared in the early hours of November 8, 1935, flying Lady Southern Cross during an attempt on the record for flying between England and Australia.

Two Altairs were used by the Japanese newspaper Mainichi Shimbun as high-speed passenger and cargo aircraft, one remaining in use until 1944.

== Variants ==
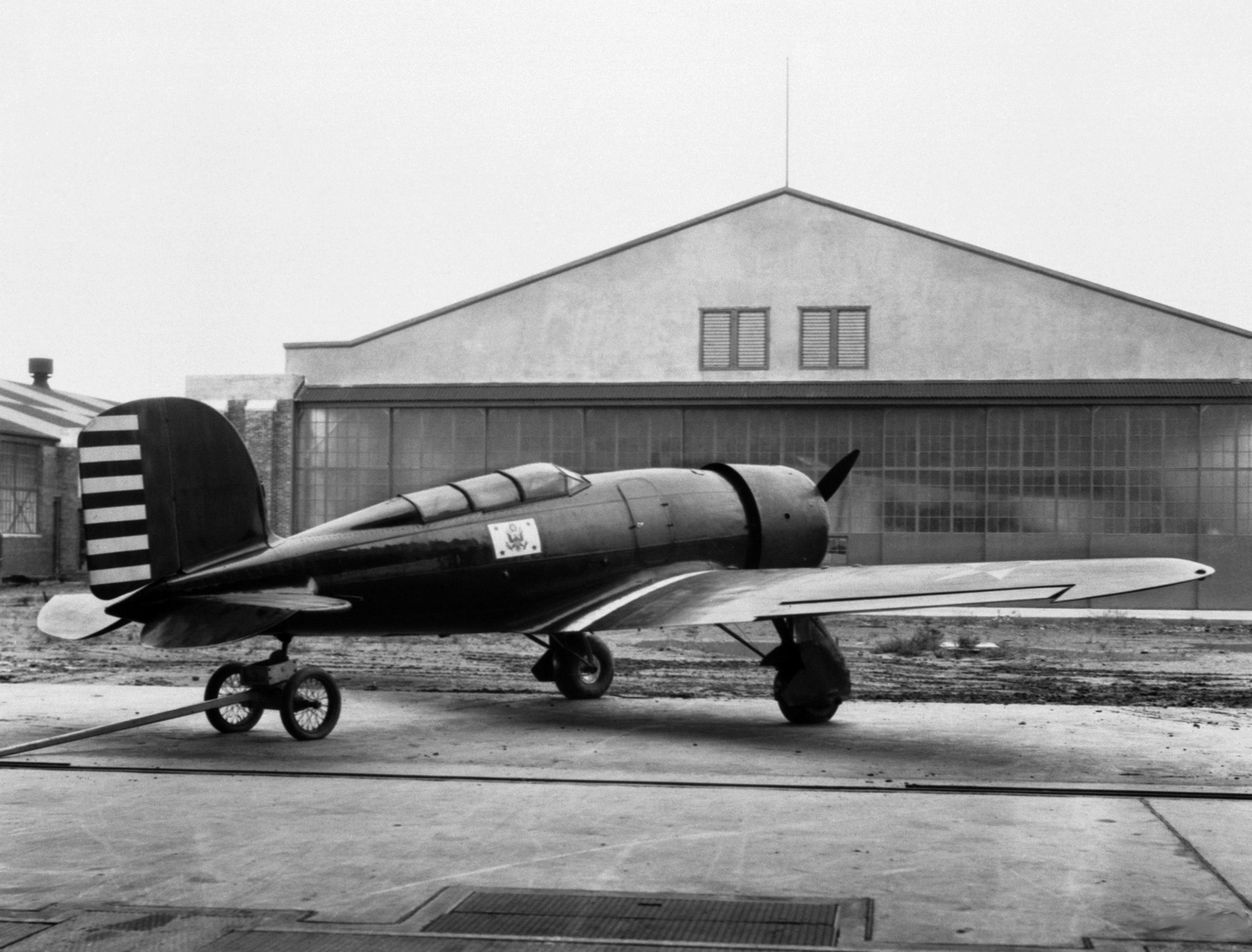
Lockheed Y1C-25 Altair

8D Altair
Two-seat long-range high-performance sports aircraft, fitted with a retractable undercarriage, powered by a 500 hp (373 kW) Pratt & Whitney SR-1340E Wasp radial piston engine; One prototype, four converted Sirius aircraft, six production aircraft.
8G Altair
One aircraft built by the AiRover Company as a testbed for the Menasco Unitwin 2-544 engine, intended for the Vega Model 2 Starliner.
Sirius 8 Special
One aircraft built for the Australian aviator Charles Kingsford Smith, it was converted into an Altair 8D aircraft, later named the Lady Southern Cross.
DL-2A
Two Altair 8Ds built by the Detroit Aircraft Corporation.
Y1C-23
The second Altair 8D was purchased by the US Army Air Corps, it was used as a staff transport aircraft. Later redesignated C-23.
Y1C-25
The Altair 8D prototype was purchased by the US Army Air Corps, powered by a 450 hp (336 kW) Pratt & Whitney R-1340-17 Wasp radial piston engine.
XRO-1
One Altair DL-2A acquired by the U.S. Navy, it was used as staff transport aircraft.

== Operators ==
Japan

- Mainichi Shimbun

United States

- United States Army Air Forces
- United States Navy

== Specifications (Y1C-23) ==
Data from Lockheed Aircraft since 1913

General characteristics

- Crew: 1
- Length: 28 ft 4 in (8.64 m)
- Wingspan: 42 ft 9 in (13.03 m)
- Height: 9 ft 6 in (2.90 m)
- Wing area: 293.2 sq ft (27.24 m^{2})
- Empty weight: 3,235 lb (1,468 kg)
- Gross weight: 4,895 lb (2,220 kg)
- Powerplant: 1 × Pratt & Whitney SR-1340E Wasp 9-cylinder air cooled radial engine, 500 hp (373 kW)

Performance

- Maximum speed: 207 mph (333 km/h, 180 kn) at 7,000 ft (2,140 m)
- Cruise speed: 175 mph (282 km/h, 152 kn)
- Range: 580 mi (935 km, 504 nmi)
- Service ceiling: 23,800 ft (7,255 m)
- Wing loading: 52.5 lb/sq ft (81.5 kg/m^{2})
- Power/mass: 0.10 hp/lb (0.17 kW/kg)
- Climb to 7,000 ft (2,140 m): 9.4 min

== See also ==
Related development

- Lockheed Vega
- Lockheed Air Express
- Lockheed Explorer
- Lockheed Sirius
- Lockheed Orion

Related lists

- List of Lockheed aircraft
- List of military aircraft of the United States
- List of United States Navy aircraft designations (pre-1962)
