= Boeing C-108 Flying Fortress =

US World War II transport aircraft

C-108 Flying Fortress
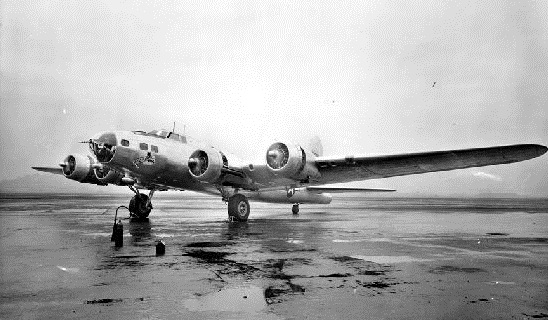
- The XC-108 running up

General information
- Type: Military transport aircraft
- Manufacturer: Boeing / Lockheed-Vega / Wright-Patterson AFB
- Primary user: United States Army Air Forces
- Number built: 4 conversions from B-17

History
- Introduction date: 1943
- First flight: 1943
- Retired: 1945
- Developed from: Boeing B-17 Flying Fortress

The Boeing C-108 Flying Fortress was an American transport aircraft used during World War II. Four were converted from B-17 Flying Fortress heavy bombers.

== Design and development ==
The first C-108 built (designated XC-108) was a B-17E (41-2593) converted to a V.I.P. transport for General Douglas MacArthur in 1943. With the exception of the nose and tail turrets, all armament was removed, as was all armor. The interior of the plane was made into a flying office for MacArthur, with extra windows, cooking facilities, and living space. To facilitate entry and exit, a drop-down door with steps was installed in the rear fuselage. A similar conversion was later made on a B-17F-40-VE (42-6036), which was redesignated YC-108.

Between August 1943 and March 1944, another B-17E (41-2595) was converted to a cargo aircraft and designated XC-108A. Hoping to convert obsolete bombers into cargo aircraft, the United States Army Air Forces initiated a remanufacturing station at Wright-Patterson Air Force Base. The plane was stripped of armament, armor, and other military equipment. Crew locations were shifted, and the nose was modified to provide space for cargo and/or personnel. The cockpit was accessed via the crawlway under it or through the hinged solid nose cone that had replaced the original glazed bombardier station. To increase cargo space, several bulkheads were removed and the bomb bay doors were sealed closed. This allowed much of the fuselage volume to be used to carry cargo or personnel.

A B-17F 42-30190 was converted (and given designation XC-108B) to tanker service. As in the XC-108A, it was devoid of armor and weapons, and the fuselage was modified to make space for its cargo. The fuselage was filled with fuel tanks.

== Operational history ==
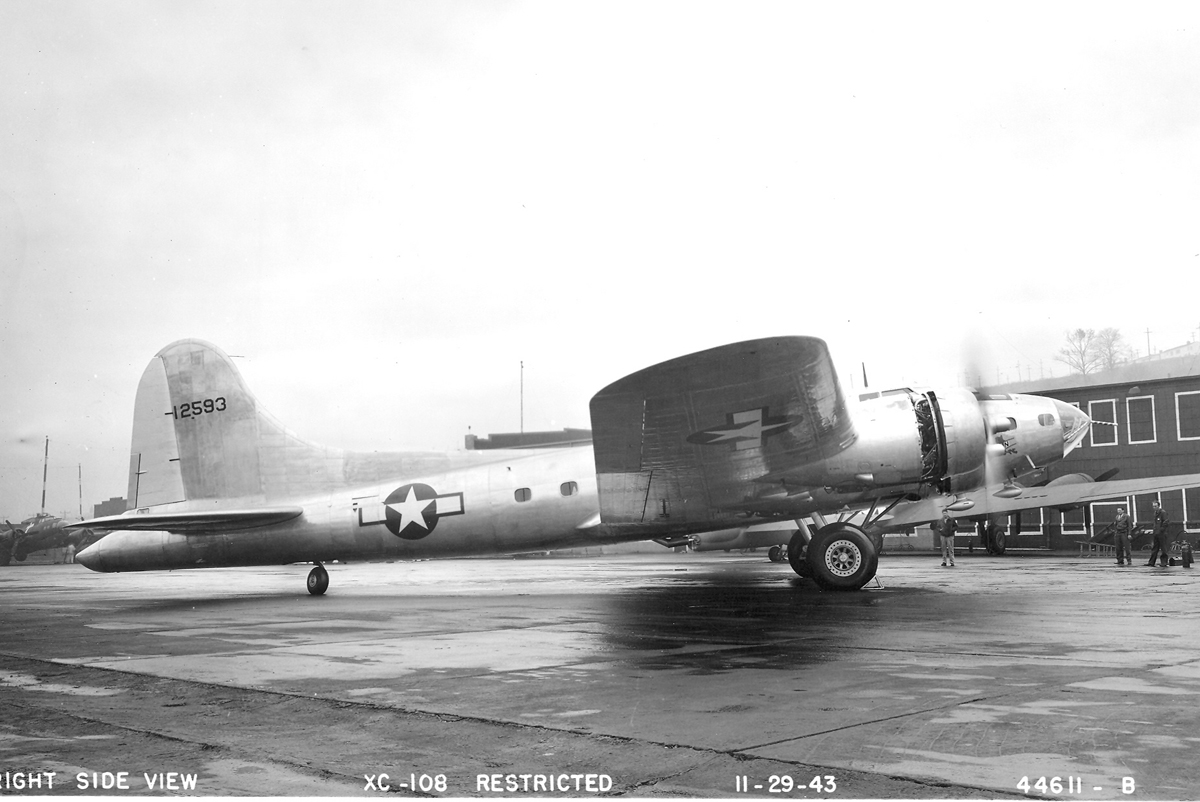
Boeing XC-108.

The XC-108 was personal VIP transport aircraft of General Douglas MacArthur in 1943.

The XC-108A was used to fly material and personnel over the Himalayas to the B-29 base in Chengdu, China. Due to chronic engine difficulties, it proved an impractical cargo aircraft. In October 1944, it was returned to the United States. By the end of the war, it was disassembled and left in a junkyard in Maine, where it suffered from some parts being scrapped and others salvaged from the airframe. Since then it has been rescued and is under restoration back to B-17E configuration.

== Variants ==
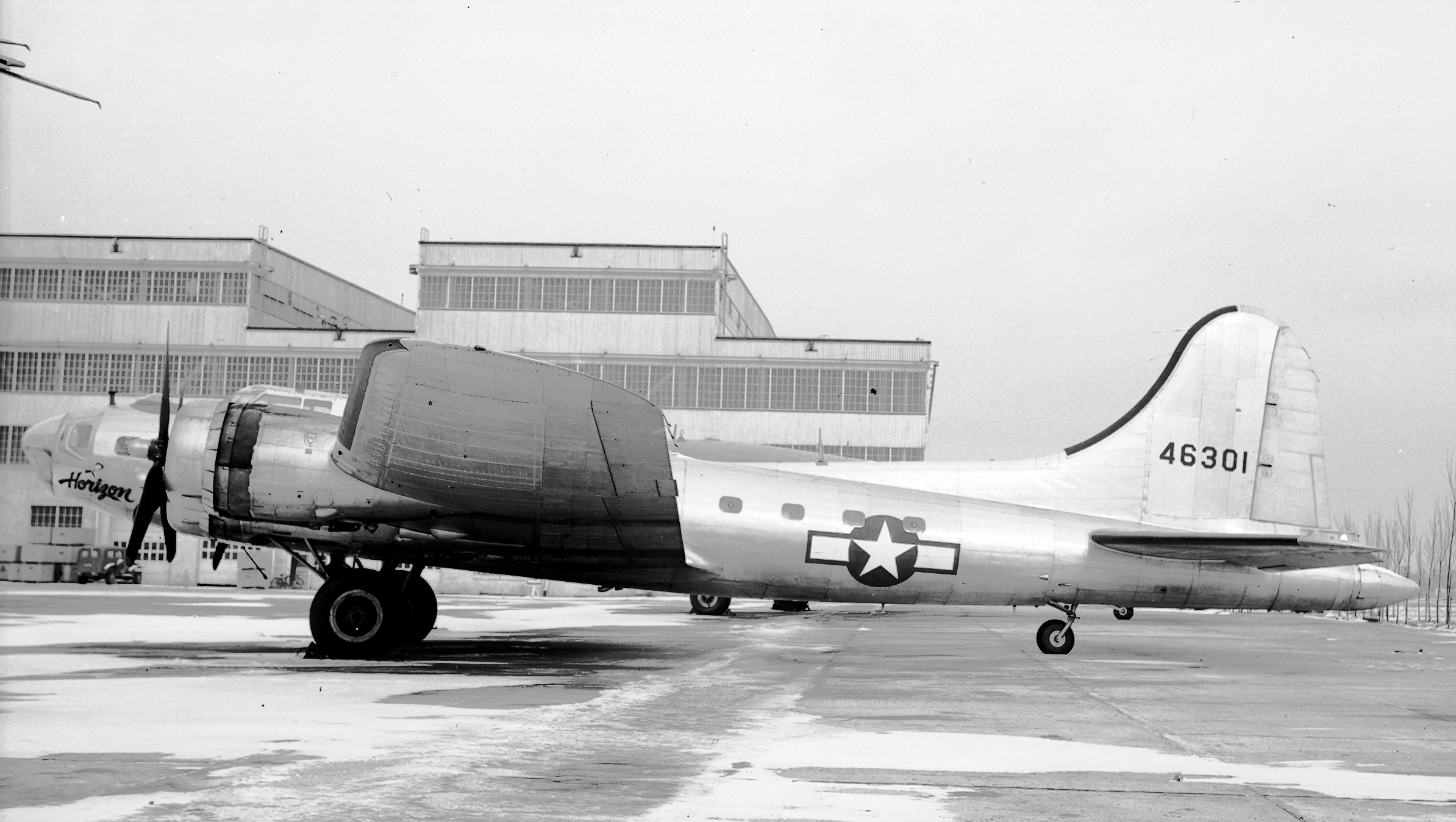
CB-17G at Patterson Field, Ohio on 1 January 1946.

XC-108
B-17E converted to VIP transport standard for General Douglas MacArthur. Originally B-17E s/n 41-2593.

YC-108
B-17F converted to VIP transport standard for General Douglas MacArthur. Originally B-17F s/n 42-6036.

XC-108A
B-17E converted to cargo or troop transport standard. Originally B-17E s/n 41-2595, known as "Desert Rat".

XC-108B
B-17F converted for service as a tanker. Originally B-17F s/n 42-30190.

Two other cargo transports and VIP transports were made from the B-17.

CB-17G
Troop transport version capable of carrying up to 64 troops, 25 built.

VB-17G
VIP transport version for high level staff officers, 8 built.

== Operators ==
United States

- United States Army Air Forces

== Surviving aircraft ==
- XC-108A, 41-2595, "Desert Rat", survived in a New England junkyard and is undergoing restoration in McHenry County, Illinois, by a private individual to B-17E configuration.

== Specifications (XC-108) ==
Data from American Military Transport Aircraft Since 1925

General characteristics

- Crew: 5
- Capacity: 64 troops or 8,000 lb (3.63 t) cargo
- Length: 74 ft 4 in (22.66 m)
- Wingspan: 103 ft 10 in (31.65 m)
- Height: 19 ft 1 in (5.82 m)
- Wing area: 1,527 sq ft (141.9 m^{2})
- Empty weight: 32,250 lb (14,628 kg)
- Gross weight: 40,260 lb (18,262 kg)
- Max takeoff weight: 53,000 lb (24,040 kg)
- Powerplant: 4 × Wright R-1820-65 9-cyl. turbo-charged air-cooled radial piston engines, 1,200 hp (890 kW) each

Performance

- Maximum speed: 274 kn (315 mph, 507 km/h)
- Cruise speed: 169 kn (195 mph, 314 km/h)
- Range: 2,900 nmi (3,300 mi, 5,300 km)
- Service ceiling: 36,600 ft (11,200 m)

Armament

- Guns: 4 × 0.5 in (12.7 mm) M2 Browning machine guns in nose and tail turret

== See also ==
- B-17 Flying Fortress variants

Related development

- B-17 Flying Fortress
- XB-38 Flying Fortress
- YB-40 Flying Fortress

Aircraft of comparable role, configuration, and era

- C-87 Liberator Express

Related lists

- List of military aircraft of the United States
