= Menasco Unitwin 2-544 =

Inverted twin six-cylinder air cooled aircraft engine

Unitwin 2-544
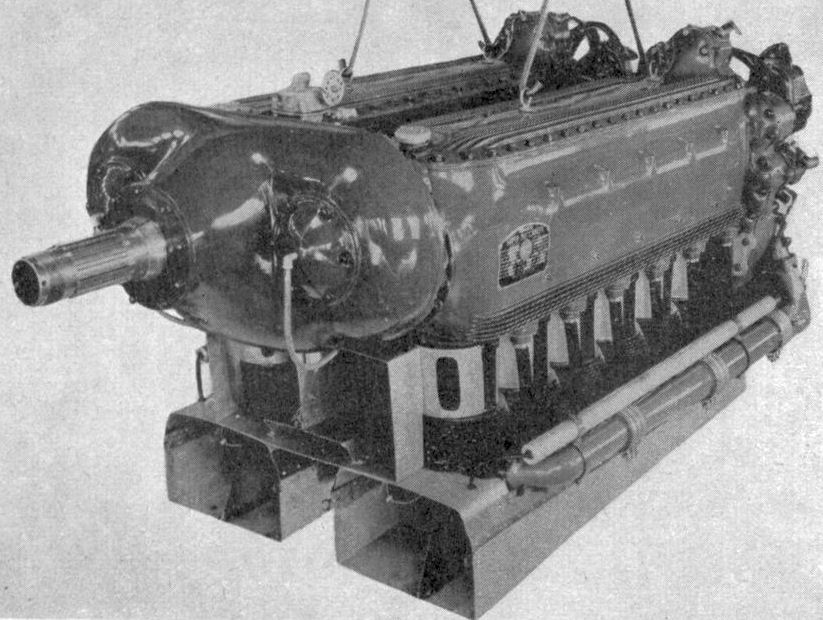
- National origin: United States
- Manufacturer: Menasco Motors Company
- First run: 1938
- Major applications: Vega Altair 8G; Vega Model 2 Starliner
- Developed from: Menasco C6S Super Buccaneer

The Menasco Unitwin 2-544 was a coupled piston engine. Menasco Motors Company of Burbank, California was a well known manufacturer of inverted inline four and six cylinder engines. At the request of Lockheed Aircraft designers, Menasco produced an inverted twelve-cylinder air cooled aircraft engine by designing a common gearbox for two of the six cylinder engines. The two crankshafts were combined with a unique double clutch gearbox to power a single propeller. This gave reliability of a twin engine aircraft in a single powerplant. It was a success, but did not enter production as no aircraft were produced that used it.

== Design and development ==
In mid-1935, Lockheed's chief engineer, Hall Hibbard, began discussing with Al Menasco, the president of the Menasco Motors Company in Burbank, the merits of coupling two Menasco C6S Super Buccaneer six-cylinder in-line engines mounted side-by-side, driving a single propeller.

In 1937, Lockheed established the AiRover Aircraft Company as a subsidiary to give Lockheed a place in the personal aviation market. Hall Hibbard wanted AiRover to use Menasco's novel twin powerplant in its first aircraft. AirRover used components of various Lockheed aircraft to construct what was designated as the Lockheed Altair 8G to serve as a flying test stand for the unproven Menasco engine. This test bed was first flown in December 1937 and confirmed the merits of its powerplant, leading to the decision to proceed with the design of a similarly-powered five-seat feeder-liner.

During 1938, the AiRover Company was reorganized as the Vega Aircraft Corporation, and with Mac V.F. Shortits installed as president, it started design of its new feeder-liner. Jack Wassail was the project engineer, and the aircraft was soon under construction in Vega's new A-1 plant, located at the recently purchased Lockheed Air Terminal.

== Operational history ==
The "Flying Testbed" was a custom built Vega Altair 8 (NX18149) used to test the experimental 520 hp Menasco Unitwin for use in the planned Starliner. The engine was two 260 hp Menasco C6S-4 Super Buccaneer engines mounted to a common gearbox that drove a single, two-blade, variable-pitch propeller. When it was no longer needed, the airplane was sold to Howard Batt, a Lockheed dealer. It was reengined with a 450 hp Pratt & Whitney Wasp SC in 1939, and was then registered as a Lockheed Altair 8-D in 1940.

Starliner Model 2, registered NX21725, rolled out of the factory in the spring of 1939 as a low-wing cabin monoplane with twin vertical tail surfaces. Its tricycle undercarriage retracted aft, with the wheels partially protruding beneath the nose and wing.

The Starliner was the first totally new Vega Airplane Company aircraft. It made its maiden flight at Burbank, California on April 22, 1939, with Vern Dorrell as pilot and J.B. Kendrick as engineering observer. The flight ended with an emergency when the propeller accidentally slipped into fine pitch. Vern Dorrell succeeded in landing on a vacant field, with minimum damage to the aircraft.

During repairs the twin tail was changed to a single vertical tail surface and an upgraded 640 hp Unitwin engine, the Starliner model 2 became the model 22 when it resumed its test flights. The Starliner was damaged again when Bud Martin had to land it on its main wheels when the nose wheel failed to come down. With the nose protected by the partially protruding front wheel, the aircraft again escaped with only slight damage to its lower cowling.

Repaired a second time, the Starliner satisfactorily completed a total of 85 flying hours; but due to its limited capacity of a pilot and four or five passengers, it was too small to satisfy the needs of the airlines. Menasco and Vega were increasingly occupied with military contracts. The only Starliner ended its life as a non-flying prop at a film studio.

== Variants ==
The Unitwin was developed in at least three versions:

520 hp Unitwin
Original version
600 hp Unitwin
for the Starliner model 2
640 hp Unitwin
for the Starliner model 22

None of these engines survived

== Applications ==
- Vega Altair 8G
- Vega Model 2 Starliner

== Specifications (U 2-544) ==
Data from Peter and Rita Ford

=== General characteristics ===
- Type: 12-cylinder inline inverted "U"
- Bore: 4.75 in (121 mm)
- Stroke: 5.125 in (130.2 mm)
- Displacement: 1088 cu in
- Length: 87.125 in
- Width: 34.625 in
- Height: 31.50 in
- Dry weight: 1,350 lb (610 kg)

=== Components ===
- Valvetrain: Pushrod overhead valve (1 intake, 1 exhaust)
- Supercharger: 10.90:1
- Fuel type: 87 octane aviation gasoline
- Cooling system: Air cooled
- Reduction gear: Direct drive
- 4 X Scintilla Magnetos

=== Performance ===
- Power output: 520 hp (390 kW)
- Compression ratio: 5.50:1
- Power-to-weight ratio: 3.00 lb/hp
- 147 bmep at cruise (450 hp at 2400 rpm and 5400 feet altitude)

== See also ==
Related development

- Menasco Buccaneer
