= Ben Rich (engineer) =

American aircraft designer (1925–1995)

- Born: Benjamin Robert Rich; June 18, 1925; Manila, Philippine Islands
- Died: January 5, 1995 (aged 69); Ventura, California, U.S.
- Education: University of California, Berkeley (BS); University of California, Los Angeles (MS); Harvard Business School
- Known for: Regarded as the "Father of stealth"
- Engineering career
- Discipline: Aeronautical engineering
- Employer: Lockheed (Skunk Works)
- Projects: U-2; SR-71 Blackbird; F-117 Nighthawk; F-22 Raptor

Benjamin Robert Rich (June 18, 1925 – January 5, 1995) was an American engineer and the second director of Lockheed's Skunk Works from 1975 to 1991, succeeding its founder, Kelly Johnson. Regarded as the "father of stealth", Rich was responsible for leading the development of the F-117, the first production stealth aircraft. He also worked on the F-104, U-2, A-12, SR-71, and F-22, among others.

== Early life ==
Rich was born in Manila in the Philippines to a Jewish family. He was one of five children of British lumber mill superintendent Isidore Rich and his French wife, Annie, the daughter of one of his paternal grandfather's Jewish customers who lived in Alexandria, Egypt. The Rich family was one of the first Jewish families to settle in Manila. Having fled the Philippines just weeks before the Empire of Japan's attack on Pearl Harbor, they moved to the United States in 1942, where Rich became a naturalized US citizen. He worked (with his father) in a Los Angeles, California, machine shop during World War II, and studied at Alexander Hamilton High School. After the war he started his college education when he was 21, majoring in mechanical engineering at University of California, Berkeley, followed by a master's degree in aeronautical engineering at University of California, Los Angeles, instead of the medical field as originally planned. He would later complete the Advanced Management Program at Harvard Business School.

== Career ==
=== Lockheed ===
Upon graduation Rich was hired by Lockheed as a thermodynamicist. There he worked on a variety of projects - he was awarded a patent for designing a nichrome heating system which prevented Navy patrol plane crew members' penises from freezing to their urine collection funnel. He designed inlet ducts for the F-104 Starfighter, the C-130 transport aircraft, and the F-90 fighter.

=== The Skunk Works ===
In December 1954 Rich transferred to the Skunk Works, the secret research and development section run by Lockheed's Chief Engineer, Clarence "Kelly" Johnson. There he designed the inlet ducts for the U-2, then led the effort to design and build a large-scale hydrogen liquefaction plant for project Suntan, a proposed hydrogen-powered supersonic very high-altitude aircraft to replace the U-2. After Suntan was canceled, Rich became propulsion systems program manager for the U-2's successors, the A-12 and the SR-71 Blackbird. Rich was chief aerodynamicist for the projects, designer of the shock cone engine inlet, air conditioning and heat management systems. He was also involved in the specification of the aircraft's black skin coatings which optimized dissipation of their tremendous aerodynamic heating as well as incorporating materials to reduce radar signature. The aircraft incorporated features that were later referred to as low observables or stealth technology.

When SR-71 crews became upset that engineers were not putting enough effort into solving a constant problem with violent engine unstarts in flight, Rich considered taking a flight in the SR-71 to experience the phenomenon himself, which included having to go through the same flight physical as pilots. He did not go through with the flight. He did eventually manage the problem by installing automatic controllers to maintain aircraft control during unstarts.

He briefly worked on a program that used ionizing radiation to help absorb radar coming from ahead of the aircraft. The radiation proved to be excessive and the test pilot disliked the heavy radiation shielding he had to wear. The project was cancelled when the military decided the radar signature was low enough without the ionizing equipment. The concept was proven to work, but unfeasible.

Later, as Johnson's successor as leader of the Skunk Works, Rich championed and directed the early experimental prototypes of stealth technology and led the development of the F-117 stealth fighter.

He is the author of Skunk Works: A Personal Memoir of My Years at Lockheed.

== Awards ==
A member of the National Academy of Engineering, he won numerous awards during his career, including the Collier Trophy. In 2005 he was inducted into the National Aviation Hall of Fame. In January 1981, he received the Department of Defense Medal for Distinguished Public Service for his work on the then-still-classified stealth airplane, in a secret ceremony in the office of then-Secretary of Defense Harold Brown. He was allowed to show the medal to his two children, Karen and Michael, but was not allowed to tell them why he had received it.

== Personal life ==
In 1950, Rich married Faye Mayer, a fashion model, who died in 1980. In 1982, Rich married Hilda Elliot. His son, Michael, is the former CEO and current President Emeritus of RAND Corporation and his daughter, Karen, is a botanist.

=== Death ===
Rich died of esophageal cancer in Ventura, California, on January 5, 1995.

== Selected aircraft ==
- F-104 Starfighter. Single-engine, high-performance, supersonic interceptor aircraft.
- XF-90. Experimental fighter / bomber escort aircraft.
- U-2 "Dragon Lady". Reconnaissance aircraft. A high altitude jet aircraft used by the CIA and the US Air Force during the cold war.
- SR-71 "Blackbird". An advanced, long-range, Mach 3.2 strategic reconnaissance aircraft. The Blackbird was designed to provide reconnaissance in defended airspace while improving aircrew survivability. In the Blackbird, mission success and survivability depended on aircraft speed. Ben Rich was responsible for engineering the spikes and engine inlet systems which made the Blackbirds the fastest jet aircraft in the world.
- F-117 Nighthawk. World's first production stealth aircraft.
- YF-22, prototype of the F-22 Raptor.
