= Kelly Johnson (engineer) =

American aerospace engineer (1910–1990)

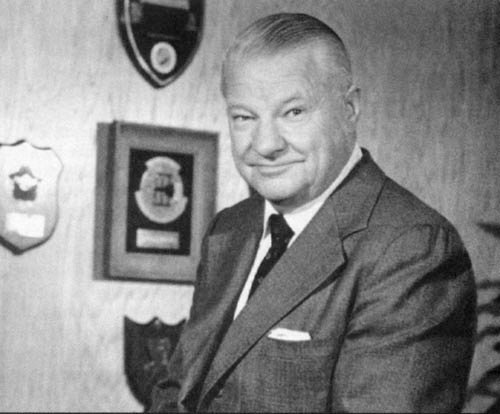
- Johnson, c. 1975
- Born: Clarence Leonard Johnson; February 27, 1910; Ishpeming, Michigan, U.S.
- Died: December 21, 1990 (aged 80); Los Angeles, California, U.S.
- Education: Flint Junior College; University of Michigan (BS, MS)
- Engineering career
- Discipline: Aeronautical engineering, systems engineering
- Employer: Lockheed Corporation
- Projects: P-38 Lightning; Skunk Works; U-2; F-104 Starfighter; SR-71 Blackbird

Clarence Leonard "Kelly" Johnson (February 27, 1910 – December 21, 1990) was an American aeronautical and systems engineer. He is recognized for his contributions to a series of important aircraft designs, most notably the Lockheed U-2 and SR-71 Blackbird. Besides the first production aircraft to exceed Mach 3, he also produced the first fighter capable of Mach 2, the United States' first operational jet fighter, as well as the first fighter to exceed 400 mph, and many other contributions to various aircraft.

As a member and first team leader of the Lockheed Skunk Works, Johnson worked for more than four decades and is said to have been an "organizing genius". He played a leading role in the design of over forty aircraft, including several honored with the prestigious Collier Trophy, acquiring a reputation as one of the most talented and prolific aircraft design engineers in the history of aviation.

In 2003, as part of its commemoration of the 100th anniversary of the Wright Brothers' flight, Aviation Week & Space Technology ranked Johnson eighth on its list of the top 100 "most important, most interesting, and most influential people" in the first century of aerospace. Hall Hibbard, Johnson's Lockheed boss, referring to Johnson's Swedish ancestry, once remarked to Ben Rich: "That damned Swede can actually see air."

== Life ==
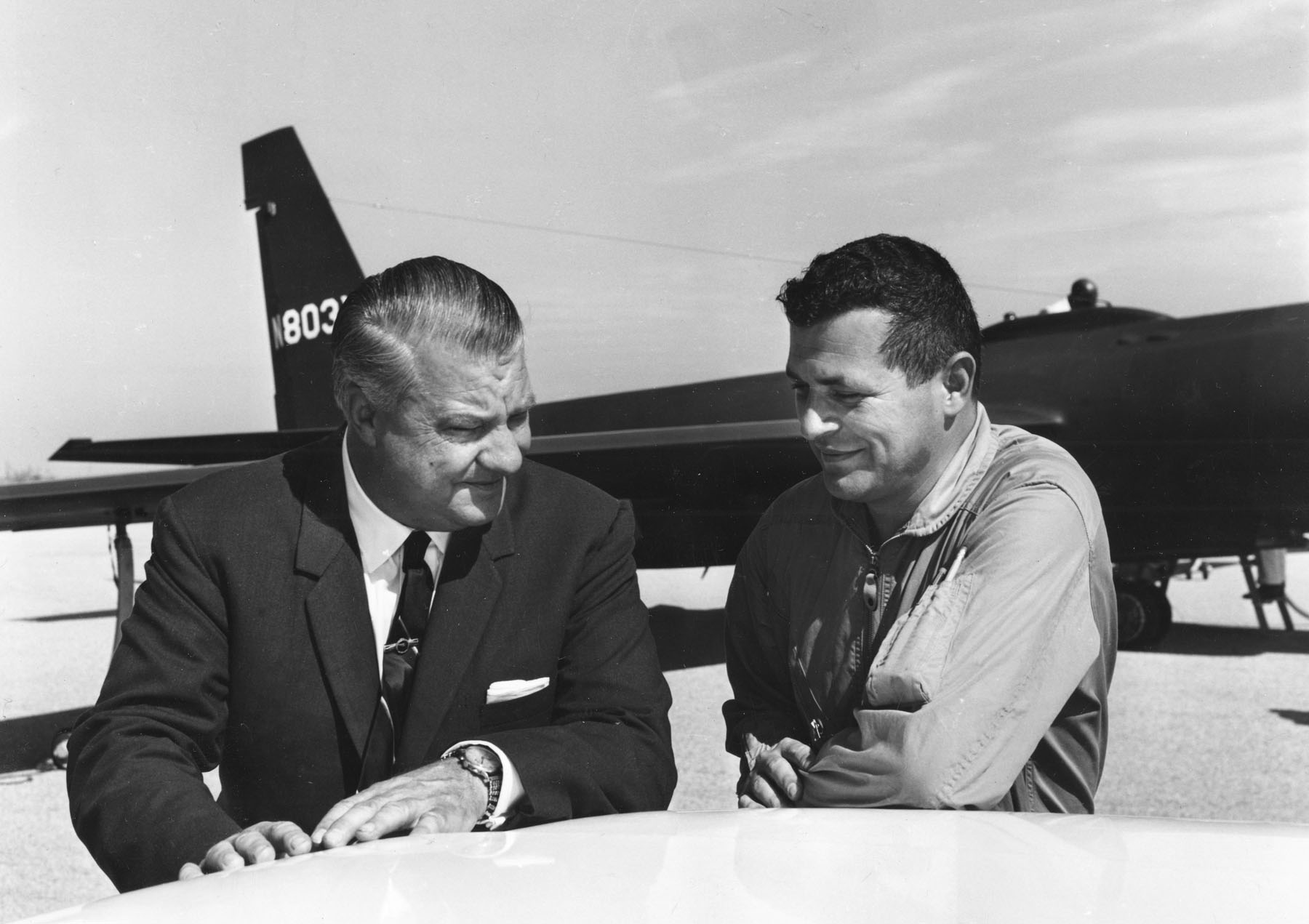
Kelly Johnson and Gary Powers in front of a U-2.

Kelly Johnson was born in the remote mining town of Ishpeming, Michigan. His parents were Swedish, from the city of Malmö, county of Scania. His father ran a construction company. Johnson was 13 years old when he won a prize for his first aircraft design. He attended Flint Central High School and graduated in 1928, then went to Flint Junior College, now known as Mott Community College, and finally to the University of Michigan in Ann Arbor, where he received a Bachelor's and Master's Degree in Aeronautical Engineering.

While attending grade school in Michigan, he was ridiculed for his name, Clarence. Some boys started calling him "Clara". One morning while waiting in line to get into a classroom, one boy started with the normal routine of calling him "Clara". Johnson tripped him so hard the boy broke a leg. The boys then decided that he was not a "Clara" after all, and started calling him "Kelly". The nickname came from the popular song at the time, "Has Anyone Here Seen Kelly? (Kelly from the Emerald Isle)". Henceforth, he was always known as "Kelly" Johnson.

In 1937, Johnson married Althea Louise Young, who worked in Lockheed's accounting department; she died in December 1969.

In May 1971, he married his secretary Maryellen Elberta Meade of New York; she died after a long illness on October 13, 1980, aged 46.

He married Meade's friend Nancy Powers Horrigan in November 1980.

His autobiography, titled Kelly: More Than My Share of it All, was published in 1985.

Johnson died at the age of 80 at St. Joseph Medical Center in Burbank after physical deterioration and the advancement of senility, caused by the hardening of his arteries connecting to his brain. During visits to the hospital, his good friend and fellow engineer Ben Rich watched his condition worsen, writing, "His eyes seemed unfocused and lifeless, and increasingly began to slip in and out of coherence. I could barely stand to visit him, and many times he seemed not even to recognize me." He is buried at Forest Lawn Cemetery, Los Angeles, California.

== Lockheed career ==
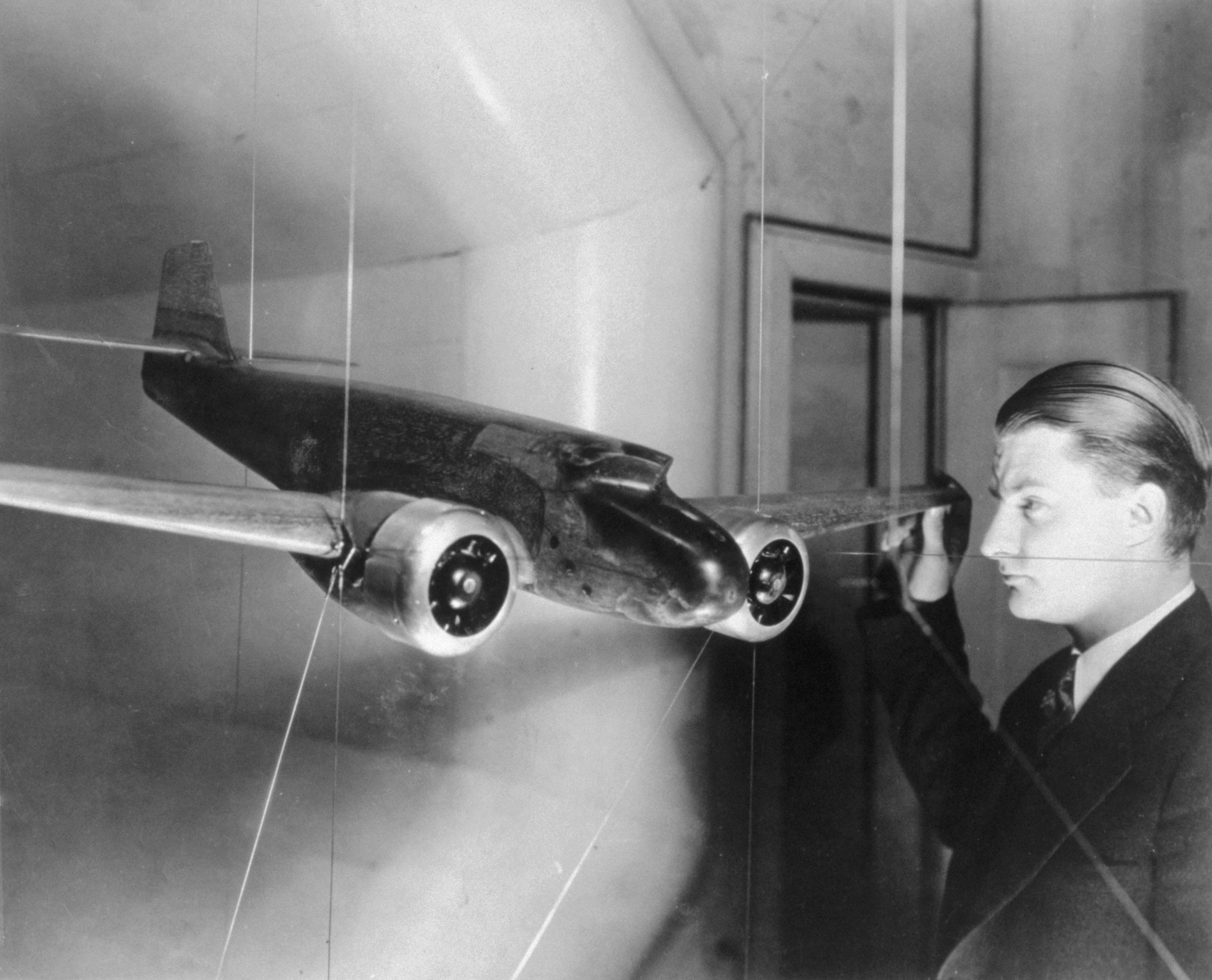
Kelly Johnson participated in the design of the Lockheed Model 10 Electra, testing a model with a single vertical stabilizer in the wind tunnel of the University of Michigan.

At the University of Michigan, Johnson conducted wind tunnel tests of Lockheed's proposed Model 10 airliner. He found the aircraft did not have adequate directional stability, but his professor felt it did and told Lockheed so. Upon completing his master's degree in 1933, Johnson joined Lockheed as a tool designer on a salary of $83 a month. Shortly after starting, Johnson convinced Hall Hibbard, the chief engineer, the Model 10 was unstable.

Hibbard sent Johnson back to Michigan to conduct more tests. Johnson eventually made multiple changes to the wind tunnel model, including adding an "H" tail, to address the problem. Lockheed accepted Johnson's suggestions and the Model 10 went on to be a success. This brought Johnson to the attention of company management, and he was promoted to aeronautical engineer.

After assignments as flight test engineer, stress analyst, aerodynamicist, and weight engineer, he became chief research engineer in 1938. In 1952, he was appointed chief engineer of Lockheed's Burbank, California plant, which later became the Lockheed-California Company. In 1956 he became Vice President of Research and Development there.

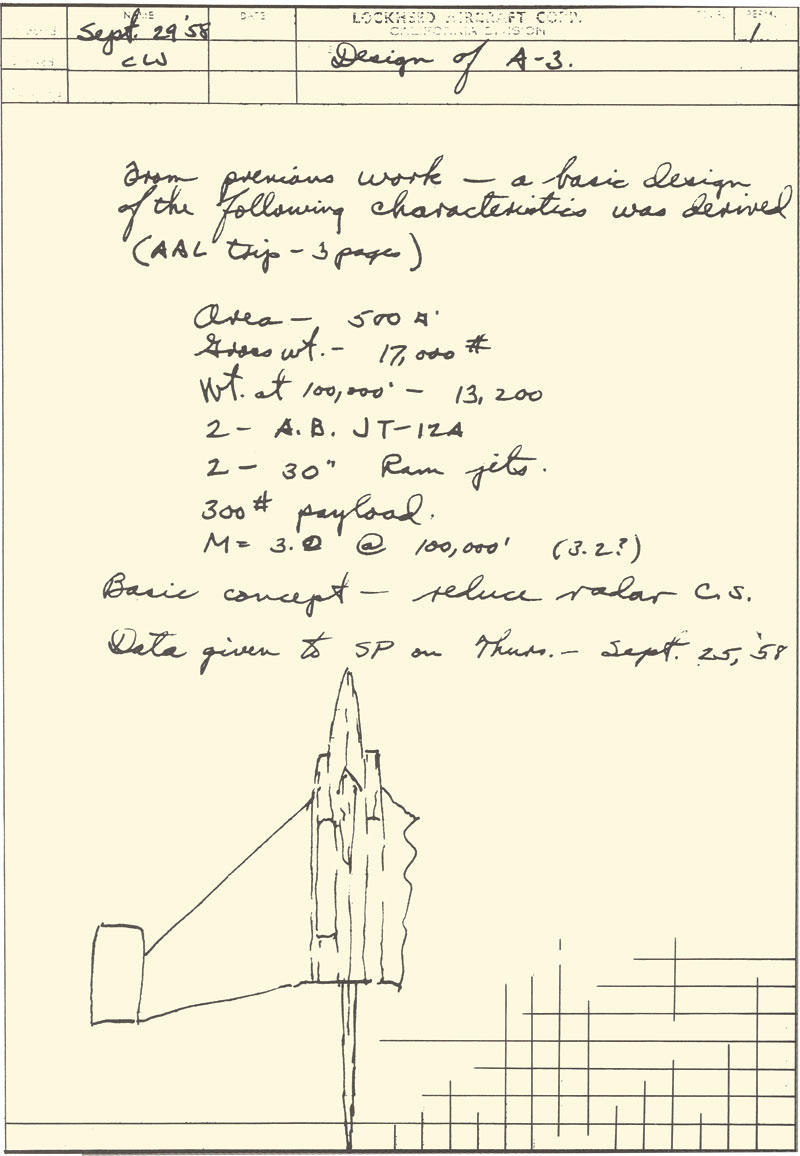
A design of the Lockheed A-3 (Mach 3 ramjet), sketch from Johnson's notebook

Johnson became Vice President of Advanced Development Projects (ADP) in 1958. The first ADP offices were nearly uninhabitable; a smelly former bourbon distillery was the first ADP location, the site where his secretive team built the first P-38 Lightning prototype. Moving from the distillery to a larger building, the stench from a nearby plastic factory was so vile that Irv Culver, one of the engineers, began answering the intra-Lockheed "house" phone "Skonk Works!"

In Al Capp's comic strip Li'l Abner, Big Barnsmell's Skonk Works (spelled with an o) was where Kickapoo Joy Juice was brewed. When the name leaked out, Lockheed ordered it changed to "Skunk Works" to avoid potential legal trouble over use of a copyrighted term. The term rapidly circulated throughout the aerospace community, and became a common nickname for research and development offices.

Johnson led or contributed to the development of a number of aircraft. A few examples illustrate the influence of his work. In the late 1930s, Johnson led the team that developed the advanced twin-engine fighter, the P-38 Lightning. Eventually, almost 10,000 Lightnings were built. They played a significant role in World War II.

In 1943, responding to United States Army Air Forces' concerns about Nazi Germany's development of high performance jet fighters, Johnson proposed to develop a jet airplane in six months. The result was the P-80 Shooting Star, which was completed on time and was America's first operational jet fighter.

In 1955, at the request of the Central Intelligence Agency, Johnson initiated construction of the airbase at Groom Lake, Nevada, later known as Area 51. This project provided a secret location for flight testing the Lockheed U-2.

Johnson also helped to design the Lockheed AQM-60 Kingfisher a decade before the famous SR-71. The Kingfisher was a highly successful single-engine Mach 4.3-capable ramjet aircraft composed mainly of steel, which was used to test American air defenses against nuclear missiles. The information and experience Johnson gained was later used to produce the A-12 spy plane for the Central Intelligence Agency. Johnson then used the combined knowledge of the Kingfisher and A-12 to produce the SR-71 Blackbird.

Johnson also led the development of the SR-71 Blackbird family of aircraft. Through a number of significant innovations, Johnson's team was able to create an aircraft that flew so high and fast that it could be neither intercepted nor shot down. No other jet airplane has matched the Blackbird's performance.

He served on Lockheed's board of directors from 1964 to 1980, becoming a senior vice president in 1969. He officially retired from Lockheed in 1975 and was succeeded by Ben Rich, but continued as a consultant at the Skunk Works. In June 1983, the Lockheed Rye Canyon Research and Development Center in Santa Clarita was renamed Kelly Johnson Research and Development Center, Lockheed-California Company, in honor of Johnson's 50 years of service to the company.

A number of factors contributed to Johnson's career. For instance, he could quickly and accurately estimate design characteristics such as mass, characteristics that usually were determined through long, ardous calculations. He was also promoting ideas while also earning others' trust. In addition, he created teams that were able to work well with each other.

== Aircraft contributions ==
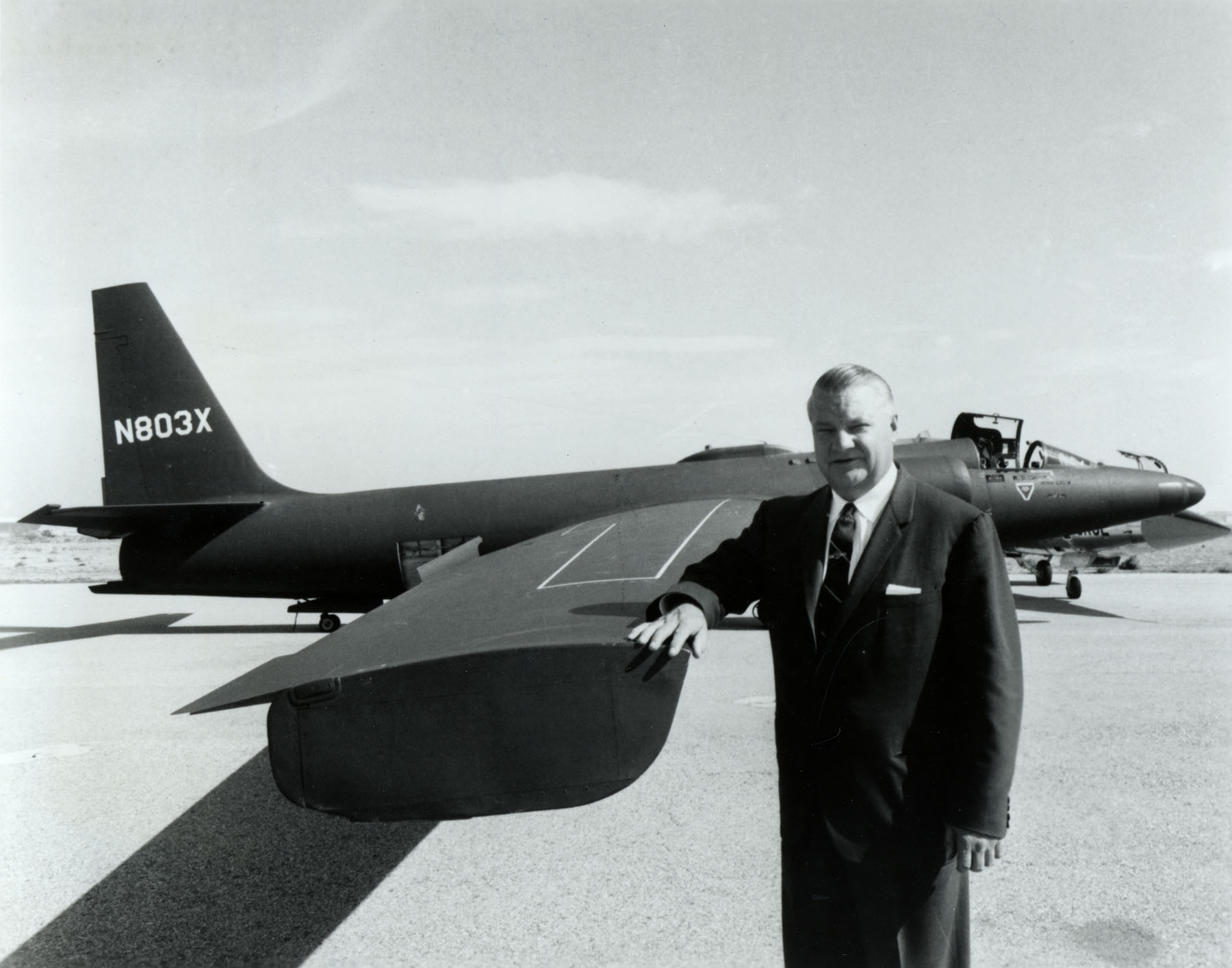
Kelly Johnson with an early variant of the U-2.

While at Lockheed, Johnson designed the P-38 Lightning fighter, made Fowler flaps work on the Model 14 Super Electra, and played a major role in converting the type into the Royal Air Force's Lockheed Hudson on short notice in 1938. He worked on the development of the Constellation for Howard Hughes' TWA airline.

Johnson contributed to the design of the following Lockheed aircraft:

- Model 9D Orion, First airliner with retractable landing gear, faster than any known military aircraft of the time. Won 1937 Harmon Trophy.
- Model 10 Electra, flown by Amelia Earhart on her ill-fated around-the-world expedition in 1937. First aircraft to perform round-trip commercial flight over Atlantic Ocean.
- Model 12 Electra Junior, upgraded version of Model 10. Used to prove wing deicing using engine exhaust, as well as testing of twin-engine aircraft aboard aircraft carriers. Used by British intelligence to spy on pre-war Nazi Germany. Won 1937 Bendix Trophy.
- Model 14 Super Electra Upgrade variant of Model 10. In 1938, completed a world-record flight of 15,441 mi (24,850 km).
- Model 18 Lodestar, competitor to famous DC-3. Similar operating cost, superior performance, smaller passenger capacity
- PV-1 Ventura, militarized version of Model 18. Would often lead B-24 bomber formations, due to being equipped with its own search radar unit. Used in both Pacific and European theater, including bombing raids on Germany, and hunting enemy submarines.
- P-38 Lightning, the first fighter to exceed 400 mph (640 km/h; 350 kn), and the aircraft which killed Admiral Isoroku Yamamoto. Holds the record for the longest interception mission of World War II.
- Constellation family, first family of pressurized airliners. Used in various military roles, including transporting President Eisenhower, and General MacArthur.
  - L-049 Constellation First version of Constellation, first four engine aircraft produced by Lockheed. Upon its first flight, the chief test pilot remarked, "This machine works so well that you don't need me anymore!"
    - L-149 Constellation, designation given to L-049 aircraft refitted with a larger fuel capacity
    - C-69 Constellation, military transport version of the Constellation. Only one served during World War II, as a troop and VIP carrier.
    - L-649 Constellation, improved L-049 which included overhead sleeping berth, as well as a removable cargo bay, the "Speedpak".
      - L-749 Constellation, improved L-649. Larger fuel capacity, strengthened landing gear, and eventually weather radar.
        - C-121/R7O/R7V Constellation, military version of L-749. Used as radar warning AWACS aircraft. President Dwight Eisenhower and General Douglas MacArthur both used the C-121A as their personal VIP transports. Also used as a freighter.
        - PO-1W/WV-1 Warning Star, airborne early warning (AEW) variant of the C-121, used to supplement the Distant Early Warning Line. EC-121s were also used for intelligence gathering.
        - L-1049 Super Constellation, stretched version of the Constellation, modified into several military variants.
            - PO-2W/WV-2/WV-3/EC-121 Warning Star. AEW variant, used along with picket ships to warn of incoming Soviet bomber attacks.
            - YC-121F/R7V-2 Constellation, experimental turboprop military transport.
          - L-1649 Starliner, last model of the Lockheed Constellation line. Powered by four Wright R-3350 TurboCompound engines.
- F-80 Shooting Star, the first successful American jet fighter. First west-to-east Atlantic crossing by single-engined jet.
- T-33 and TV-2, trainer versions of F-80.
- P2V Neptune, anti-submarine bomber. Temporarily kept aboard aircraft carriers to use as a stop gap, one use, nuclear bomber. Incapable of landing on aircraft carrier after launch.
- XF-90, prototype penetration fighter. First USAF jet with an afterburner and the first Lockheed jet to fly supersonic.
- F-94 Starfire, first operational USAF fighter equipped with an afterburner and the first jet-powered all-weather fighter to enter combat.
- X-7, testbed for ramjet engines and missile guidance technology. Dropped from B-52 and assisted by rocket on initial flight phase, exceeded Mach 4.
- F-104 Starfighter, first Mach 2 fighter to enter service. With its GE J79 engine, it won the 1958 Collier Trophy for its Lockheed and GE technical achievement.
- F-117A Nighthawk, first operational stealth aircraft.
- C-130 Hercules, turboprop military transport. Longest continuous production run of any military aircraft in history. Over 40 models serving in at least 60 nations.
- U-2, high altitude intelligence gathering aircraft.
- Blackbird family: A-12, YF-12, SR-71, M-21, and D-21. First family of operational Mach 3 aircraft. Composed almost entirely of titanium. The CIA M-21 was capable of launching a Mach 3 drone, known as the D-21. The YF-12 interceptor version was capable of launching a Mach 4 version of the AIM-47 Falcon missile, capable of hitting bombers flying at extremely low altitude. Johnson's second Collier Trophy (1963).
- JetStar/C-140, first dedicated business jet to enter service.

== Kelly Johnson's 14 Rules of Management ==
Johnson is sometimes cited as the originator of the KISS principle, and his famed "down-to-brass-tacks" management style was summed up by his motto, "Be quick, be quiet, and be on time." He ran Skunk Works by "Kelly's 14 Rules":

1. The Skunk Works manager must be delegated practically complete control of his program in all aspects. He should report to a division president or higher.
2. Strong but small project offices must be provided both by the military and industry.
3. The number of people having any connection with the project must be restricted in an almost vicious manner. Use a small number of good people (10% to 25% compared to the so-called normal systems).
4. A very simple drawing and drawing release system with great flexibility for making changes must be provided.
5. There must be a minimum number of reports required, but important work must be recorded thoroughly.
6. There must be a monthly cost review covering not only what has been spent and committed but also projected costs to the conclusion of the program. Don't have the books 90 days late, and don't surprise the customer with sudden overruns.
7. The contractor must be delegated and must assume more than normal responsibility to get good vendor bids for subcontract on the project. Commercial bid procedures are very often better than military ones.
8. The inspection system as currently used by the Skunk Works, which has been approved by both the Air Force and Navy, meets the intent of existing military requirements and should be used on new projects. Push more basic inspection responsibility back to subcontractors and vendors. Don't duplicate so much inspection.
9. The contractor must be delegated the authority to test his final product in flight. He can and must test it in the initial stages. If he doesn't, he rapidly loses his competency to design other vehicles.
10. The specifications applying to the hardware must be agreed to well in advance of contracting. The Skunk Works practice of having a specification section stating clearly which important military specification items will not knowingly be complied with and reasons therefore is highly recommended.
11. Funding a program must be timely so that the contractor doesn't have to keep running to the bank to support government projects.
12. There must be mutual trust between the military project organization and the contractor with very close cooperation and liaison on a day-to-day basis. This cuts down misunderstanding and correspondence to an absolute minimum.
13. Access by outsiders to the project and its personnel must be strictly controlled by appropriate security measures.
14. Because only a few people will be used in engineering and most other areas, ways must be provided to reward good performance by pay not based on the number of personnel supervised.

Johnson had a 15th rule that he passed on by word of mouth. According to the book Skunk Works the 15th rule is: "Starve before doing business with the damned Navy. They don't know what the hell they want and will drive you up a wall before they break either your heart or a more exposed part of your anatomy."

== Honors and awards ==
- 1932 (September) Sheehan Fellowship in Aeronautics, at the University of Michigan.
- 1937 Lawrence Sperry Award, Presented by the Institute of Aeronautical Sciences for "Important improvements of aeronautical design of high speed commercial aircraft."
- 1940 The Wright Brothers Medal, presented by SAE for "Rudder control problems on four-engined airplanes."
- 1956 The Sylvanus Albert Reed Award, presented by the Institute of Aeronautical Sciences, for "Design and rapid development of high performance subsonic and supersonic aircraft."
- 1956 Elected Aviation Man of the Year by a group of Aviation writers and editors appointed by the Airlines Activities Committee, representing 7,000 airline employees.
- 1958 Elected Distinguished Member of the Jet Pioneers Association of U.S.A.
- 1959 Co-Recipient of the Collier Trophy as designer of the airframe of the F-104 Starfighter, sharing the honor with General Electric (J79 engine) and U.S. Air Force (Flight Records). The F-104 was designated the previous year's "Greatest achievement in aviation in America."
- 1960 The General Hap Arnold Gold Medal, presented by the Veterans of Foreign Wars for "Design of the U-2 high altitude research plane."
- 1961 Chosen as one of 50 outstanding Americans of meritorious performance in the fields of endeavor, to be honored as a Guest of Honor to the first annual Banquet of the Golden Plate in Monterey, California. Honor was awarded by vote of the National Panel of Distinguished Americans of the Academy of Achievement.
- 1963 The Theodore von Karman Award, presented by the Air Force Association for "Designing and directing development of the U-2, thus providing the Free World with one of its most valuable instruments in the defense of freedom."
- 1963 Elected an Honorary Member of the Aerospace Medical Association, in appreciation of his sincere and effective interest and activities in behalf of their work.
- 1964 The Presidential Medal of Freedom, presented by President Lyndon B. Johnson in ceremonies at the White House. The highest civil honor the President can bestow, this recognizes "Significant contributions to the quality of American life." Johnson was cited for his advancement of aeronautics.
- 1964 The Award of Achievement, presented by the national Aviation club of Washington D.C., for "Outstanding achievement in airplane design and development over many years, including such models as the Constellation, P-80, F-104, JetStar, the U-2, and climaxed by the metallurgical and performance breakthroughs of the A-11 (YF-12A).
- 1964 The Collier Trophy (his second), following his work on the YF-12 Interceptor, capable of flying at more than 2,000 mph. His achievement for the previous year was called the greatest in American aviation.
- 1964 The Theodore von Karman Award (his second), presented by the Air force Association for his work with the A-11 (YF-12A) Interceptor.
- 1964 Honorary degree of Doctor of Engineering, University of Michigan.
- 1964 Honorary degree of Doctor of Science, University of Southern California.
- 1965 Honorary degree of Doctor of Laws, University of California at Los Angeles.
- 1965 San Fernando Valley Engineer of the Year, so designated by the San Fernando, California, Valley Engineers Council.
- 1965 Elected a Member of the National Academy of Engineering.
- 1965 Elected a Member of the National Academy of Sciences.
- 1965 Selected as one of the first 20 individuals to be included in the International Aerospace Hall of Fame in San Diego, California.
- 1966 The Sylvanus Albert Reed Award (his second) given by the American Institute of Aeronautics and Astronautics "In recognition of notable contributions to the aerospace sciences resulting from experimental or theoretical investigations."
- 1966 National Medal of Science, presented by President Lyndon B. Johnson at the White House.
- 1966 The Thomas D. White National Defense Award, presented by the U.S. Air Force Academy in Colorado Springs, Colorado, in recognition of "your great contributions to the national defense and security of the United States"
- 1967 Elected Honorary Fellow of American Institute of Aeronautics and Astronautics.
- 1968 Elected a Fellow of the Royal Aeronautical Society.
- 1969 The General William Mitchell Memorial Award, presented by the Aviators Post #743 of the American Legion.
- 1970 Awarded the Spirit of St. Louis Medal by the American Society of Mechanical Engineers.
- 1970 On behalf of Lockheed's Advanced Development Projects facility, which he directed until his retirement in 1975, accepted the first annual Engineering Materials Achievements Award of the American Society for Metals.
- 1970 The Engineering Merit Award-Presented by the Institute for the Advancement of Engineering, Beverly Hills, California.
- 1970 Honored by the Air Force Association, Washington D.C., for design of the P-38 Lightning.
- 1971 Awarded the Sixth Annual Founders Medal by the National Academy of Engineering (NAE) at the Statler-Hilton Hotel, Washington D.C.. in recognition of his fundamental contributions to engineering.
- 1972 Awarded the Silver Knight Award by the Lockheed Management Club of California at the Hollywood Palladium for his contributions to Lockheed's success.
- 1973 Awarded the first "Clarence L. "Kelly" Johnson Award" by The Society of Flight Test Engineers in Las Vegas, Nevada, for his contributions to aviation and flight test engineering.
- 1973 Civilian Kitty Hawk Memorial Award by Los Angeles Area Chamber of Commerce for his outstanding contributions in the field of aviation.
- 1974 Air Force Exceptional Service Award for his many outstanding contributions to the United States Air Force. Presented by the Secretary of the Air force, John McLucas.
- 1974 Enshrined in the National Aviation Hall of Fame in Dayton, Ohio, for his outstanding contributions to aviation.
- 1975 Awarded the Central Intelligence Agency's Distinguished Intelligence Medal for his work on reconnaissance systems.
- 1975 Awarded the Wright Brothers Memorial Trophy for his vital and enduring contributions over a period of 40 years to the design and development of military and commercial aircraft.
- 1978 The American Institute of Aeronautics and Astronautics presented "A Salute to Kelly Johnson" night.
- 1980 Awarded the Bernt Balchen Trophy, the highest award of the New York State Air Force Association. The trophy is presented annually to "An individual of national prominence whose contribution to the field of aviation has been unique, extensive or of great significance." It followed announcement of the A-12.
- 1981 Presented the Department of Defense Medal for Distinguished Public Service. Presented by Harold Brown.
- 1981 Honored by the Society of Automotive Engineers (SAE) for his ability to motivate a small staff to work within a tight time frame and budget in creating revolutionary aircraft design.
- 1981 The U.S. Air Force creates the "Kelly Johnson Blackbird Achievement Trophy" to recognize the individual or group who has made the most significant contribution to the U-2, SR-71 or the TR-1 Program since the previous annual reunion.
- 1981 The Daniel Guggenheim Medal, "For his brilliant design of a wide range of pace-setting, commercial, combat and reconnaissance aircraft, and for his innovative management techniques which developed these aircraft in record time at minimum cost."
- 1982 The Meritorious Service to Aviation Award from National Business Aircraft Association, recognizing design of more than 40 aircraft, including the world's first business jet, the JetStar.
- 1983 The Aero Club of Southern California presented the Howard Hughes Memorial Award for 1982 to C. L. "Kelly" Johnson as a leader in aviation. The recipient must have devoted a major portion of his life to the pursuit of aviation as a science and as an art. Engraved on the medal was the sentence: "His vision formed the concept, His courage forged the reality".
- 1983 The National Security Medal was presented by President Ronald Reagan to Clarence L. Johnson for "Exceptional meritorious service performed in a position of high responsibility and have made an outstanding contribution to the National Security of the Nation".
- 1984 Honorary Royal Designer for Industry (HonRDI), in recognition of achievements in aircraft design, conferred by the Royal Society for the encouragement of the Arts, Manufacturers, and Commerce, London.
- 2003 Listed at number eight in Aviation Week's "All-Time Top 100 Stars of Aerospace and Aviation".
- 2013 Listed at number 23 in Flying Magazine's "51 Heroes of Aviation.
- 2024 Inducted into the Engineering and Science Hall of Fame, located at the Engineers Club of Dayton, Ohio. The international Hall of Fame honors engineers and scientists who advance human flourishing and promote science, technology, engineering and mathematics education.

== Memberships ==
- Honorary fellow of the American Institute of Aeronautics and Astronautics
- Fellow of the Royal Aeronautical Society
- Member of the Society of Automotive Engineers
- Member of Tau Beta Pi, the Engineering Honor Society.
- Member of Sigma Xi, the Scientific Research Society

== See also ==
- Kelly Johnson (disambiguation)
- Clarence Johnston (disambiguation)
