= Kelly Johnson =

Kelly Johnson may refer to:

- Kelly Johnson (engineer) (1910–1990), American aeronautical engineer
- Kelly Johnson (baseball) (born 1982), American baseball player
- Kelly Johnson (figure skater) (born 1961), Canadian ice dancer
- Kelly Johnson (guitarist) (1958–2007), English lead guitarist with rock band Girlschool
- John Kelly Johnson (1841–1894), American politician and judge

== See also ==
- Kelley Johnson (born 1992), Miss Colorado 2015
- Kelley Johnson (footballer) (born 1992), Puerto Rican footballer
- Kelly D. Johnston (born 1956), Secretary of the U.S. Senate
