= Clarence Graham =

Sir Clarence Johnston Graham, 1st Baronet (8 May 1900 – 22 December 1966) was a businessman and an Ulster Unionist Party politician in Northern Ireland.

== Background ==
The son of John Graham JP and Sarah (née Porter) Graham was educated at Banbridge Academy and the Queen's University, Belfast. He was director of his family's firm, John Graham (Dromore) Ltd, engineering contractors (est. c. 1788) from 1955.

According to his gravestone, Sir Graham married Margaret Christina who died January 1, 1954 at the age of 46.

Graham Construction remains one of the largest construction firms in Northern Ireland and operates throughout the UK.

== Politics ==
Graham was Chairman of the Standing Committee of the Ulster Unionist Council from 1947 to 1963. He was Chairman of Dromore Urban Council (1928–32) and of Iveagh Unionist Association (1935–65), and President of the latter from 1965 until his death.

Controversially, along with Brian Maginess, he called for the UUP to encourage Roman Catholic membership whilst speaking at a Young Unionists meeting in 1959.

== Baronetcy ==
Having been knighted in 1952 he was, in 1964, created Baronet, of Dromore, County Down. There were nine baronetcies created in 1964, no more were created until 1990, when Denis Thatcher was a recipient. Sir Clarence was succeeded by his son, John Moodie Graham (born 3 April 1938), upon his death. Sir John Graham, the second baronet, lived in Fort Lauderdale, Florida, before returning to Northern Ireland

== See also ==
- Clarence Johnston (disambiguation)

Baronetage of the United Kingdom
| New title | Baronet (of Dromore); 1964–1966 | Succeeded by John Moodie Graham |
