= Vega Model 2 Starliner =

Prototype five seat feeder airliner

Model 2 Starliner
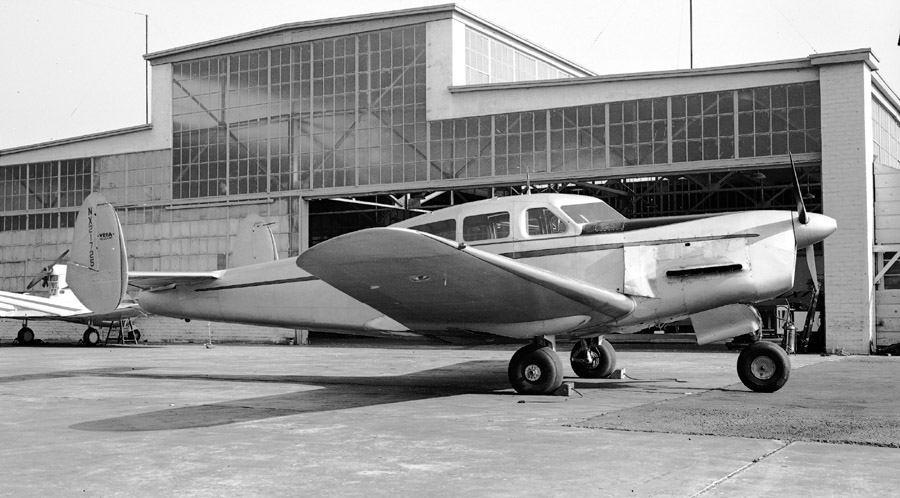
- The Vega Starliner at Union Air Terminal, circa 1940

General information
- Type: Feederliner
- National origin: United States of America
- Manufacturer: Vega Aircraft Corporation
- Status: Scrapped
- Number built: 1

History
- First flight: 22 April 1939

The Vega Model 2 Starliner was a prototype five-seat feeder airliner produced by the Vega Airplane Company, a subsidiary of Lockheed. It was designed to be powered by an unusual powerplant, consisting of two Menasco piston engines coupled together to drive a single propeller. A single example was built, flying in 1939, but no production followed.

== Design and development ==
In 1935 Lockheed chief engineer Hall Hibbard discussed with Al Menasco the coupling of two Menasco C6S-4 engines mounted side-by side, driving a single propeller. In 1937, a Lockheed subsidiary, the AiRover Company, designed the Model 2 Starliner, to be powered by the new 520 hp (388 kW) Menasco U2-544 Unitwin engine. The Starliner was a low-wing monoplane constructed with a light-alloy semi-monocoque structure conventional tail and rearward retracting undercarriage which remained exposed when retracted. The enclosed cabin was available in two cabin layouts: a custom luxury setup for private owners or a "Starliner" five seat configuration with a smaller baggage compartment for airline use. The twin engine design was intended to provide a margin of safety in the event of a failure of one engine half, with the airplane continuing to fly on the other engine half.

The AiRover Company undertook to build the Starliner and was re-organised as the Vega Airplane Company in 1938, with Jack Wassall as project engineer. The sole Starliner emerged in early 1939 and was marketed as a small feeder-liner and custom executive transport. The first flight from Burbank on 22 April 1939 ended with an emergency landing, after the propeller slipped into fine-pitch. During the repairs the single tail unit was replaced with a Lockheed trademark twin tail.

Found to be too small for airline use, the Starliner was discontinued with the need for Lockheed and Vega to concentrate on military contracts, but the Starliner name would later be reused on the Lockheed L-1649 Starliner.

== Operational history ==
The prototype was first flown by Harry Downs at Plant B-1 in Burbank, California on 22 April 1939, making an emergency landing when the propeller entered fine-pitch. Flight testing continued after repairs, but another forced-landing occurred after the undercarriage failed to extend. Repaired again, the Starliner completed its flight test program, flying a total of 85 hours before the aircraft was sold to a movie studio for use as a non-flying prop.

== Variants ==
Model 2
Single tail version
Model 22
Twin tail version
Model 24
Cargo version

== Operators ==
United States

- Mid-Continent Airlines (proposed)
- Vega Aircraft Corporation

== Specifications ==
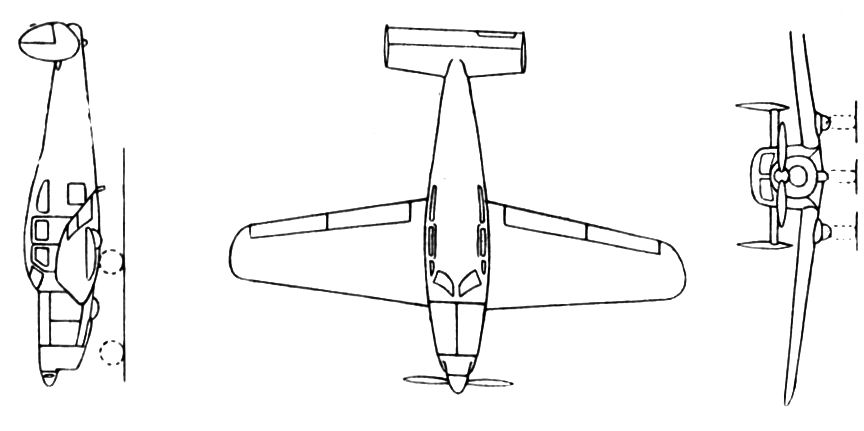

Data from Vega Airplane Company Brochure

General characteristics

- Crew: 1
- Capacity: 4 passengers
- Length: 32 ft 5 in (9.88 m)
- Wingspan: 41 ft 0 in (12.50 m)
- Height: 8 ft 6 in (2.59 m)
- Wing area: 295 sq ft (27.4 m^{2})
- Empty weight: 4,190 lb (1,901 kg)
- Gross weight: 6,000 lb (2,722 kg)
- Fuel capacity: 100 US gal (83 imp gal; 380 L) or, optionally, 160 US gal (130 imp gal; 610 L)
- Powerplant: 1 × Menasco Unitwin 2-544 12-cylinder coupled air-cooled in-line piston engine, 520 hp (390 kW)
- Propellers: 2-bladed constant-speed propeller

Performance

- Maximum speed: 210 mph (340 km/h, 180 kn) at 7,500 ft (2,286 m)

195 mph (169 kn; 314 km/h) at sea level

- Cruise speed: 178 mph (286 km/h, 155 kn) 66% power at 7,500 ft (2,286 m)

200 mph (174 kn; 322 km/h) 75% power at 12,000 ft (3,658 m)
155 mph (135 kn; 249 km/h) on one engine half

- Landing speed: 61 mph (53 kn; 98 km/h) with flaps
- Range: 640 mi (1,030 km, 560 nmi) on one engine half with 100 US gal (83 imp gal; 380 L) fuel

1,060 mi (920 nmi; 1,710 km) on one engine half with 160 US gal (130 imp gal; 610 L) fuel

- Ferry range: 1,060 mi (1,710 km, 920 nmi)
- Service ceiling: 21,500 ft (6,600 m)

10,500 ft (3,200 m) on one engine half

- Rate of climb: 1,350 ft/min (6.9 m/s)

350 ft/min (1.8 m/s) on one engine half

- Wing loading: 20.3 lb/sq ft (99 kg/m^{2})
- Power/mass: 0.0869 hp/lb (0.1429 kW/kg)

== See also ==
Aircraft of comparable role, configuration, and era

- Beechcraft Model 34 – Another airplane with a coupled engine that did not progress beyond the prototype stage
- ERCO Ercoupe – Another twin tail light airplane from the 1930s
- SNCASO SO.7010 Pégase – Another light passenger airplane with coupled engines that did not progress beyond the prototype stage
