= Clarence Johnston =

Clarence Johnston may refer to:

- Clarence Howard-Johnston (1903–1996), admiral in the Royal Navy
- Clarence Johnston (jazz drummer) (1924–2018)
- Clarence H. Johnston Sr. (1859–1936), American architect
- Kelly Johnson (engineer) (Clarence Leonard Johnson, 1910–1990), American aeronautical and systems engineer
- Bill Johnston (golfer) (Clarence William Johnston, 1925–2021), American golf course architect and golfer

== See also ==
- Clarence Graham (Clarence Johnston Graham, 1900–1966), businessman and politician in Northern Ireland
