= Boeing XB-38 Flying Fortress =

American bomber prototype

XB-38 Flying Fortress
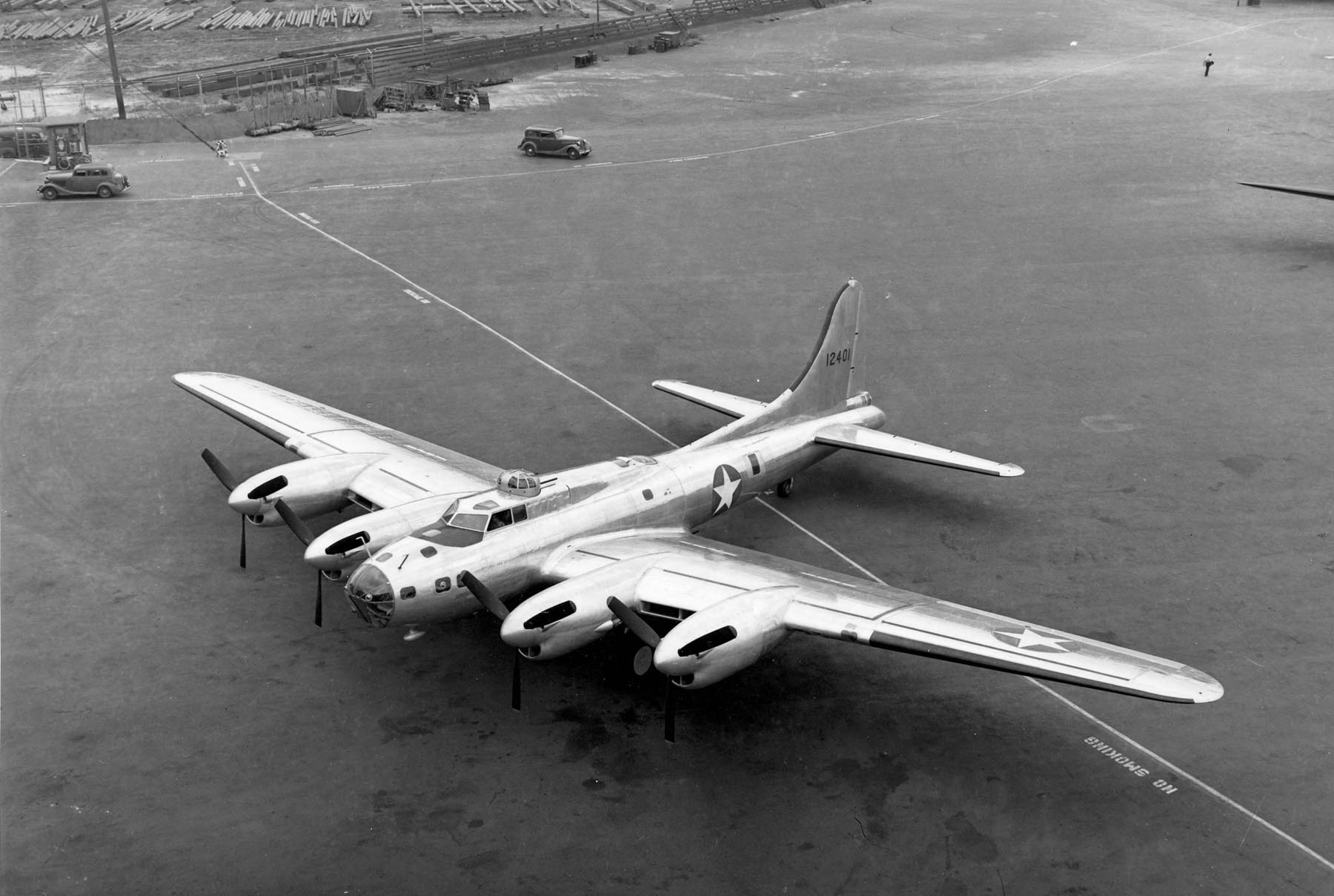

General information
- Type: Strategic bomber
- Manufacturer: Boeing (B-17E aircraft)/Vega (modifications)
- Status: Cancelled
- Primary user: United States Army Air Forces
- Number built: 1

History
- First flight: 19 May 1943
- Retired: 16 June 1943
- Developed from: Boeing B-17 Flying Fortress

The XB-38 Flying Fortress was a single example conversion of a production B-17E Flying Fortress, testing whether the Allison V-1710 V type engine could be substituted for the standard Wright R-1820 radial engine during early World War II.

== Design and development ==
The XB-38 was the result of a modification project undertaken by Vega (a subsidiary of Lockheed) on a Boeing B-17 Flying Fortress to fit it with liquid-cooled Allison V-1710-89 V-12 engines. It was to be an improved B-17, and an alternative if the normally fitted air-cooled Wright R-1820 radial engines became scarce. Completing the modifications took less than a year, and the XB-38 made its first flight on May 19, 1943. Only one was built, and it was modified from a regular production aircraft.

The XB-38 delivered a higher top speed, but its ceiling was lower. After a few flights it was grounded due to exhaust gas leaks from the engine manifolds. Once this had been fixed, testing resumed until the ninth flight on June 16, 1943 when the inboard starboard engine caught fire and the crew bailed out. The XB-38 was destroyed and the project was canceled, in part because the V-1710 engines were in high demand for Lockheed P-38 Lightning, Curtiss P-40 Warhawk and North American P-51A Mustang fighters.

== Operators ==
United States

- United States Army Air Forces

== Specifications (XB-38) ==
Data from Lockheed Aircraft since 1913.

General characteristics

- Crew: 10
- Length: 74 ft 0 in (22.56 m)
- Wingspan: 103 ft 11 in (31.67 m)
- Height: 19 ft 2 in (5.84 m)
- Wing area: 1,420 sq ft (131.9 m^{2})
- Empty weight: 34,750 lb (15,762 kg)
- Gross weight: 56,000 lb (25,401 kg)
- Max takeoff weight: 64,000 lb (29,030 kg)
- Powerplant: 4 × Allison V-1710-97 turbosupercharged liquid-cooled V12 engines, 1,425 hp (1,063 kW) each

Performance

- Maximum speed: 327 mph (526 km/h, 284 kn) at 25,000 ft (7,600 m)
- Cruise speed: 226 mph (364 km/h, 197 kn)
- Range: 3,300 mi (5,310 km, 2,870 nmi)
- Service ceiling: 29,600 ft (9,020 m)

Armament

- Guns: 10× .50 in (12.7 mm) Browning M2 machine guns
- Bombs: 6,000 lb (2,700 kg)

== See also ==
Related development

- B-17 Flying Fortress
- XB-39 Superfortress

Related lists

- List of bomber aircraft
- List of military aircraft of the United States
