= Menasco Motors Company =

American engineering and aerospace manufacturing company

Menasco Manufacturing Company
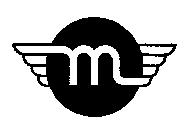
- Industry: Aerospace
- Founded: 1926
- Founder: Albert S. Menasco
- Defunct: 1977
- Fate: Bought by Colt in 1977
- Successor: Menasco Manufacturing Company
- Headquarters: Burbank, California, United States
- Parent: Colt Industries (1977-1990); Coltec Industries (1990-1999)

The Menasco Manufacturing Company was an American aircraft engine and component manufacturer.

== History ==
The company was organized by Albert S. Menasco in 1926 to convert World War I surplus Salmson Z-9 water-cooled nine-cylinder radials into air-cooled engines for private use. His association with John K. (Jack) Northrop and his flying wing project in the late 1920s convinced him of the need for a new configuration of aircraft engine: an inverted in-line air-cooled layout that would have the propeller shaft on top for better ground clearance and improved pilot vision.

In 1929, Menasco designed his own engine, the 4-A, the first of what was to become Menasco's main product line, the inverted, in-line engine. Menasco designed and built a variety of four- and six-cylinder inverted air-cooled aircraft engines, some with supercharging.

During WWII, Menasco manufactured aircraft landing gear for North American, Lockheed, Republic, General Dynamics, and others. After WWII, aircraft landing gear became Menasco's main product.

=== Menasco engines ===
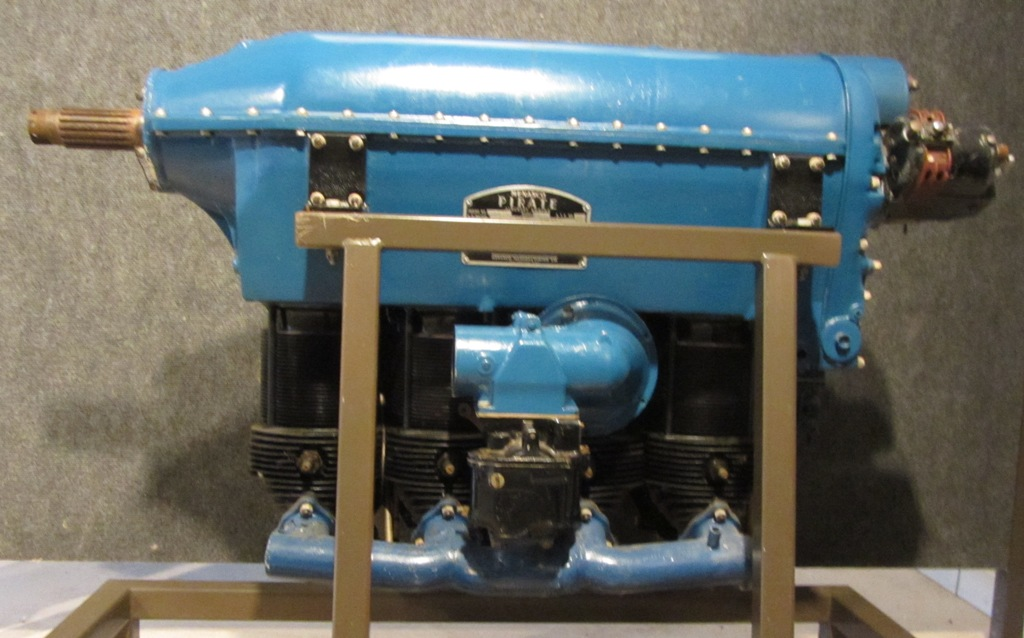
Menasco C-4 Pirate

In 1935 Menasco took over American Cirrus Engines (A.C.E.). A.C.E. manufactured a range of air-cooled four-cylinder inline aero engines, originally licensed from the UK.

The best-known Menasco engines are the air-cooled, inverted inline four- and six-cylinder engine series known as the Pirate and Buccaneer, respectively. Al Menasco was deeply involved with air racing and his engines were popular with racers who needed a small displacement engine. None of the early supercharged engines were production designs with ATC ratings. One of the less obvious benefits Menasco offered was his willingness to build custom engine combinations to fit special airplanes for reasonable prices.

An important advantage of owning a Menasco engine was Al's appreciation of the economics of using off the shelf interchangeable parts whenever possible. His company was the only supplier of inverted in-line engines in the early thirties in the USA. They had reasonably high power, and a ready availability of complete engines and repair parts.

Production of certified engines did not begin until 1936 when Art Chester was hired by Menasco for research and development for the C4S (220-230 hp) and B6S (290 hp) engines. Chester was a race pilot who had a reputation for getting the most horses out of his four-cylinder Menasco, and keeping it reliable at the same time.

A new engine was introduced in 1937: the six-cylinder C6S-4 model, rated at 400 hp at 3300 rpm and 70 in of manifold pressure. It was the first Menasco that really had the power potential to win the Thompson Trophy race. The first prototype went to Rudy Kling for his new Folkerts SK-3 racer in early 1937. In 1938 the commercial version of the C6S-4 was ATC certified at 260 hp.

=== Menasco retires ===
Al Menasco left the company in 1938. Menasco opened a car dealership, tried his hand at grape cultivation and winemaking, and was sought for advice by aviators and engine manufacturers until his death in 1988.

=== Aircraft landing gear ===
In 1945, Menasco Motor Company changed its name to Menasco Manufacturing Company to better describe the company's business, which had transitioned from aircraft engines to development and manufacturing aircraft landing gear. By 1946, the company was a subcontractor to Lockheed Aircraft Corp. and manufactured and designed technologies related to gas turbine technologies.

More than 80,000 gear sets were produced during WWII, including such aircraft as the Lockheed P-38 Lightning, the North American P-51 Mustang, the Republic P-47 Thunderbolt, and the Lockheed P-80 Shooting Star.

Beginning about 1946, landing gear manufacturing shifted to include commercial airliners. By the end of the 1990s, Menasco Aerosystems was the free world's largest producer of aircraft landing gear, with plants in California, Texas and Canada. A few of the aircraft that gear sets were made for include the A-7, F-102, C-130, C-141, the Space Shuttle, F-16, F-16E, F-18, F-18E, YF-22, B-1, C-5A, C-5B, B-52, and tip gear for the B-36. Gear sets for Boeing include the 707, 727, 737, 757, 777 and the KC-135. Gear sets were also made for the Lockheed L-1011, Boeing, Douglas, Convair, Martin, McDonnel, Republic, North American and other aircraft manufacturers.

Although the firm built thousands of engines for a variety of training aircraft during WWII, it did not resume engine manufacturing or development after the war, instead focusing on developing its landing gear business. Menasco landing gear became the industry standard, as its reputation for quality was acknowledged across the aircraft industry.

==== Into space ====
Menasco built the landing gear that allowed the space shuttle to land on a runway. It manufactured the landing gear of the Orbiter structure launched in 1977 from a 300-M steel coated in titanium-cadmium plating.

=== Mergers ===
==== Malabar Machine Company ====
Malabar Machine Company was started in 1935 by Mr. E.P. “Ed” Grime (pronounced Grim) as a machine shop for manufacturing items for customers. Malabar’s primary business was aircraft jacks, including axle jacks for servicing aircraft, railroads, and automobiles.

Menasco Manufacturing Company acquired Malabar in 1945, and relocated it to its Burbank, California, plant to operate as the “Malabar Division” of Menasco. Malabar’s sales efforts included both domestic and international airlines and airframe manufacturers.

Malabar continues to manufacture aircraft jack products, and offers a line of aircraft maintenance and support equipment.

==== Howmet Corporation ====
In 1970, Menasco, a corporation with manufacturing plants in Burbank, California, and Fort Worth, Texas, purchased two California plants from Howmet Corporation, in Montebello and Pomona, both in California, taking over Howmet's contracts and manufacturing operations for the production of aircraft landing gear. Because the Montebello plant was operating at a substantial loss, Menasco closed the plant.

==== Colt Industries ====
In 1977, Colt Industries bought Menasco as part of its expansion into the aerospace technology development and manufacturing business sector. Menasco was a supplier of landing gears to General Dynamic in the manufacture of F-16 fighter jets that were sold to the United States NATO allies. As a supplier, Menasco was forced to share its technology with Dutch and Japanese companies, which eventually became its competitors in the global market.

==== Colt Changes Name to Coltec ====
Colt Industries sold its firearms business, a divestiture that led it to change its name to Coltec Industries to emphasize its role as a producer of aerospace, automotive and industrial products.

Coltec was a manufacturer of landing gear systems, engine fuel controls, turbine blades, fuel injectors, nozzles and related components for commercial and military aircraft, and also produces high-horsepower diesel engines for naval ships and diesel, gas and dual-fuel engines for electric power plants. The divisions, principal products and principal markets of the Aerospace/Government segment are as follows:

Division	Principal product	Principal market
Menasco	Aircraft landing gear systems and components, flight control actuation systems and other aircraft components	Commercial and military aircraft manufacturers
Chandler Evans Control Systems	Aircraft fuel pumps and control systems	Aircraft engine manufacturers
Walbar	Blades, vanes and discs for jet engines	Aircraft engine manufacturers
Delavan Gas Turbine Products	Fuel injectors, spraybars and other components for gas turbine engines	Aircraft engine manufacturers
Lewis Engineering	Cockpit instrumentation and sensors	Commercial and military aircraft and engine manufacturers
Fairbanks Morse Engine	Large engines powered by fuel or natural gas	U.S. Navy, electric diesel utilities

=== The end ===
==== Closing the Burbank Plant ====
In the first quarter of 1994, Coltec Industries Inc. closed its landing gear manufacturing plant in Burbank, California, consolidating the production of landing gear systems at its Menasco Aerosystems facility in Fort Worth, Texas, and its Menasco Aerospace Ltd. facility in Oakville, Ontario, Canada.

==== Coltec purchased by Goodrich Aerospace ====
Coltec Industries was acquired by Goodrich Corporation Goodrich Aerospace in 1999 in a $2.2 billion merger, creating a company with interests in aerospace, specialty chemicals and industrial products. It was the second major aerospace acquisition of the year for Goodrich. After approval by shareholders and anti-trust regulators, the merged company moved to Coltec's headquarters in Charlotte, North Carolina. Goodrich is based in Richfield, Ohio.

On July 26, 2012, United Technologies Corporation purchased Goodrich. Unsold Divisions of Hamilton Sundstrand and Goodrich were then merged to create UTC Aerospace Systems.

== Products ==
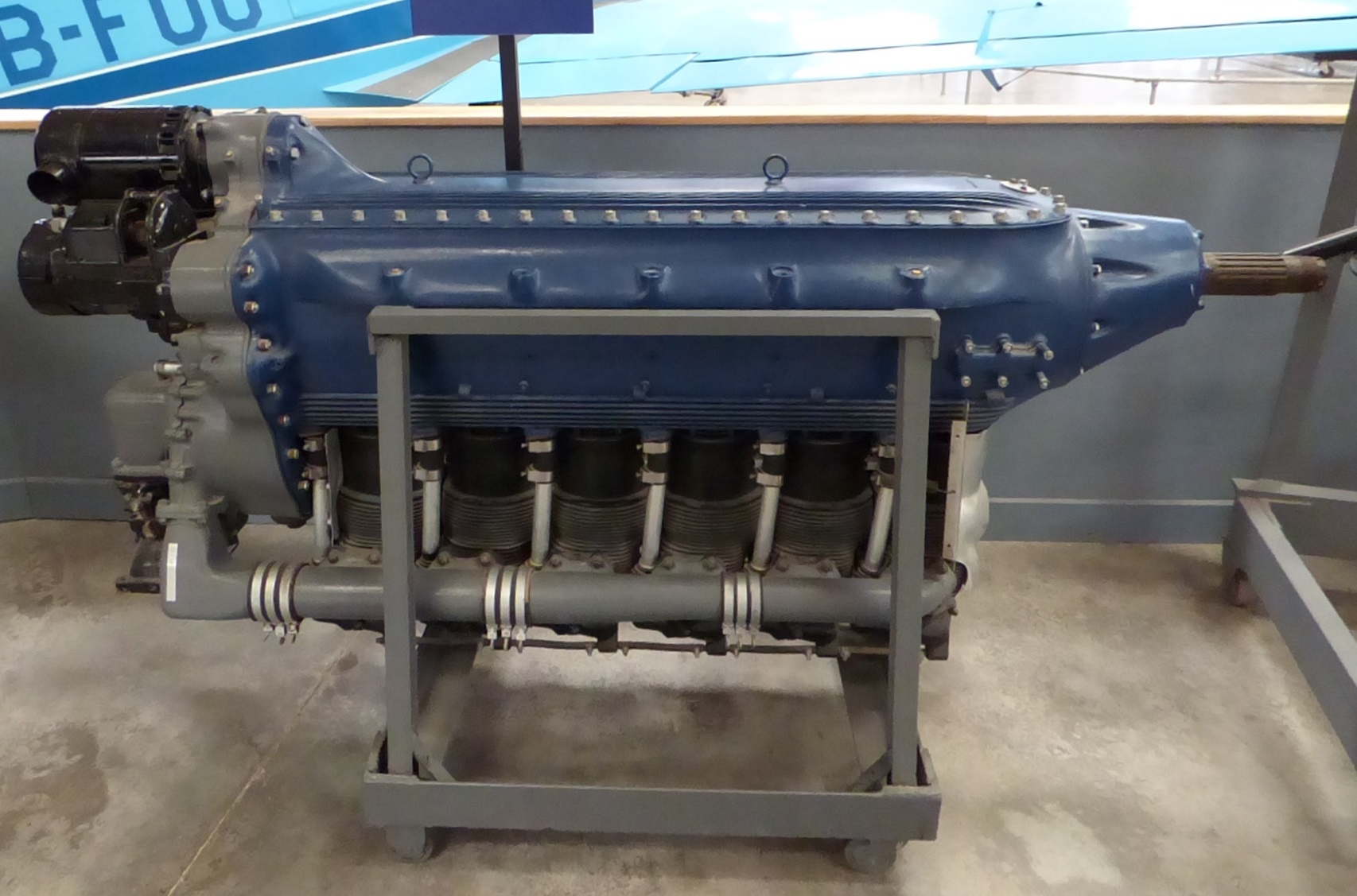
Menasco C6S-4 Super Buccaneer

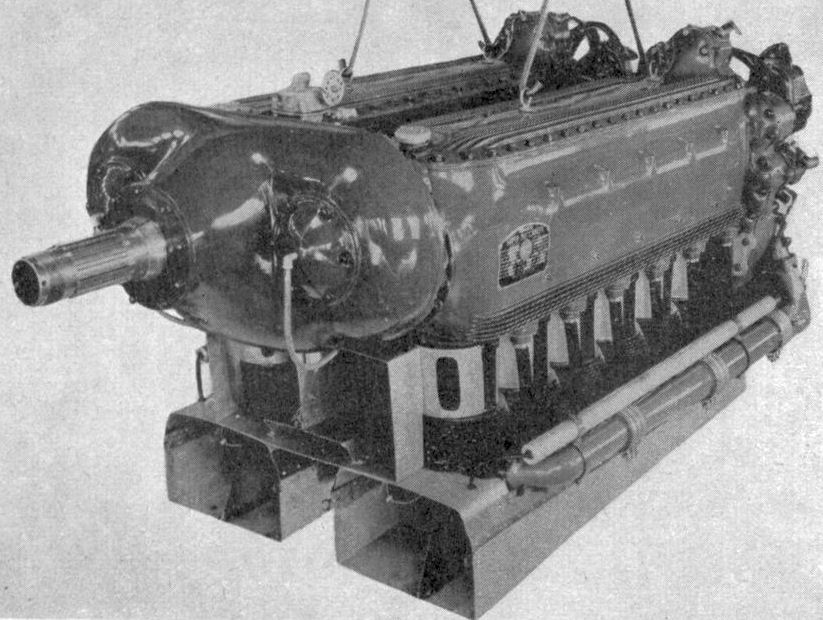
Menasco U2-544 Unitwin

Model name	Configuration	Power
Menasco-Salmson B-2	R9	250 hp
Menasco A-4 Pirate	I4	90 hp
Menasco B-4 Pirate	I4	95 hp
Menasco C-4 Pirate	I4	125 hp
Menasco C-4S Pirate	I4	150 hp
Menasco D-4 Pirate	I4	125 hp
Menasco D-4-87 Super Pirate	I4	134 hp
Menasco M-50 Pirate	O4	50 hp
Menasco A6 Buccaneer	I6	
Menasco B6 Buccaneer	I6	
Menasco C6 Buccaneer	I6	
Menasco C6S Super Buccaneer	I6	
Menasco D6 Super Buccaneer	I6	
Menasco U2-544 Unitwin	I12	520 hp
Menasco XIV-2040	IV12	2,000 hp
Menasco XH-4070		
Menasco RJ37		
