= Thermodynamicist =

In thermodynamics, a thermodynamicist is someone who studies thermodynamic processes and phenomena, i.e. the physics and engineering that deal with mechanical action and relations of heat.

Among the well-known number of famous thermodynamicists, include Sadi Carnot, Rudolf Clausius, Willard Gibbs, Hermann von Helmholtz, Walter Nernst and Max Planck.

== History of term ==
Although most consider the French physicist Nicolas Sadi Carnot to be the first true thermodynamicist, the term thermodynamics itself wasn't coined until 1849 by Lord Kelvin in his publication An Account of Carnot's Theory of the Motive Power of Heat.

The first thermodynamic textbook was written in 1859 by William Rankine, a civil and mechanical engineering professor at the University of Glasgow.

== See also ==
- Thermodynamicists
- Thermodynamics topics
