= Vega Aircraft Corporation =

American aircraft manufacturer

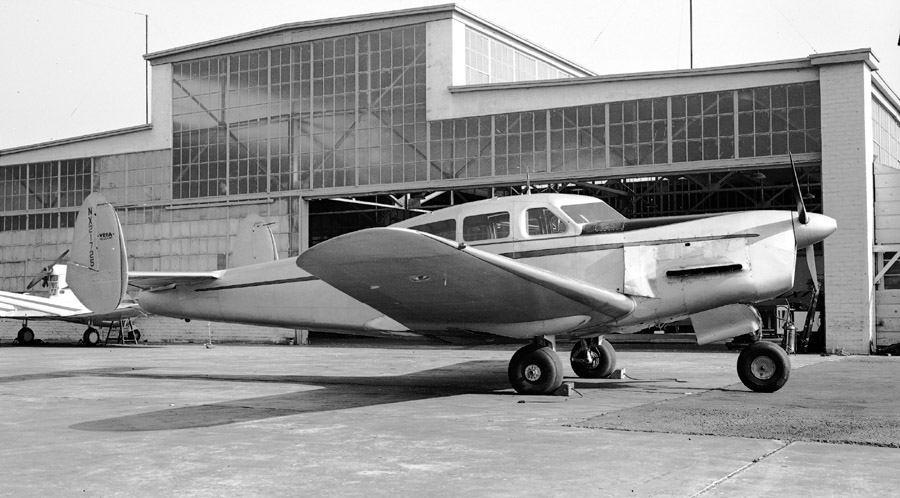
- The Vega Starliner at Union Air Terminal, circa 1940
- Formerly: AiRover Company
- Industry: Aerospace
- Founded: February 24, 1937; 89 years ago
- Founders: Robert E. Gross
- Defunct: November 30, 1943
- Fate: Merged with Lockheed Aircraft Company
- Successor: Lockheed Aircraft Company
- Headquarters: Burbank, California, United States of America
- Parent: Lockheed Aircraft Company

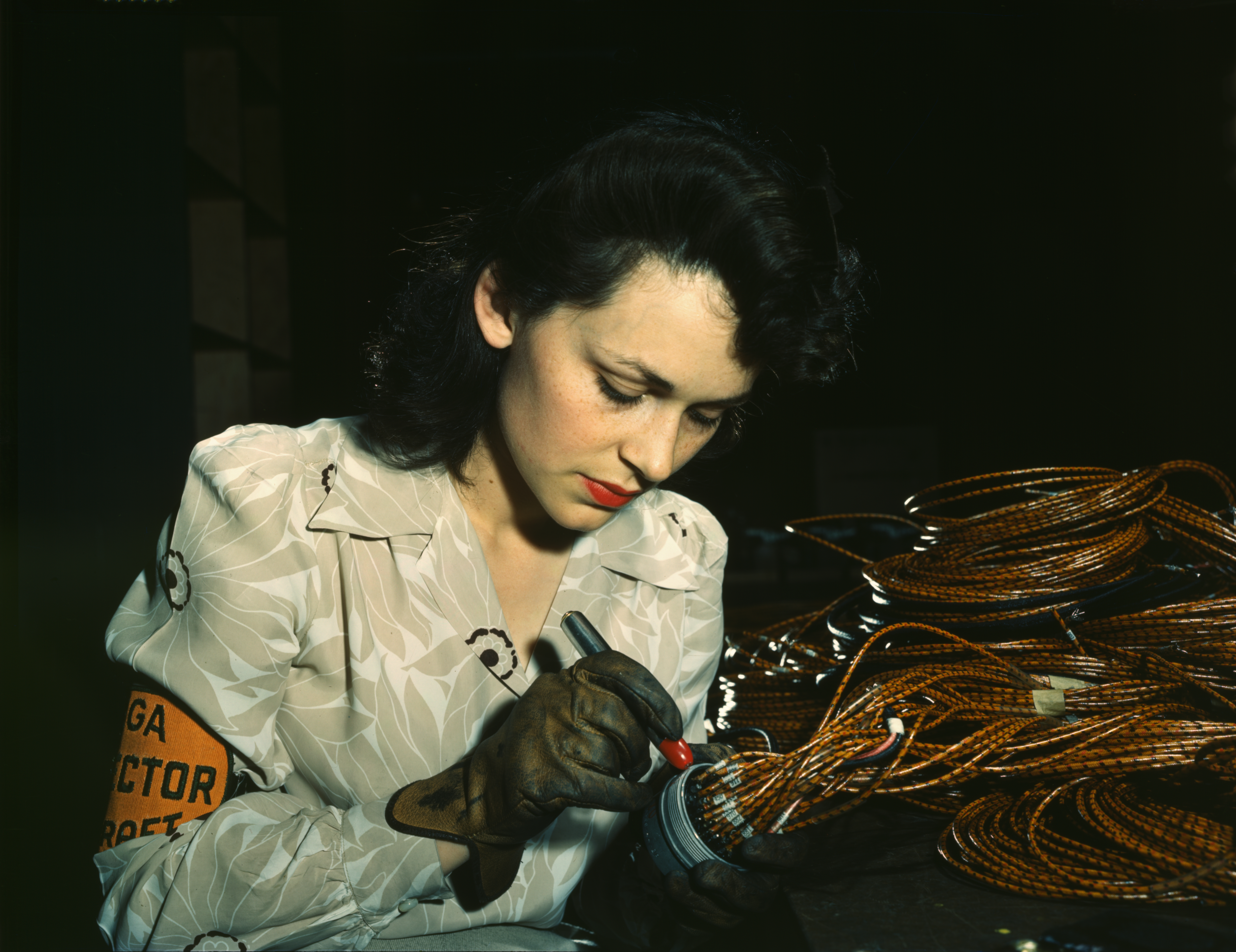
A worker at the Vega Aircraft Corporation during World War II

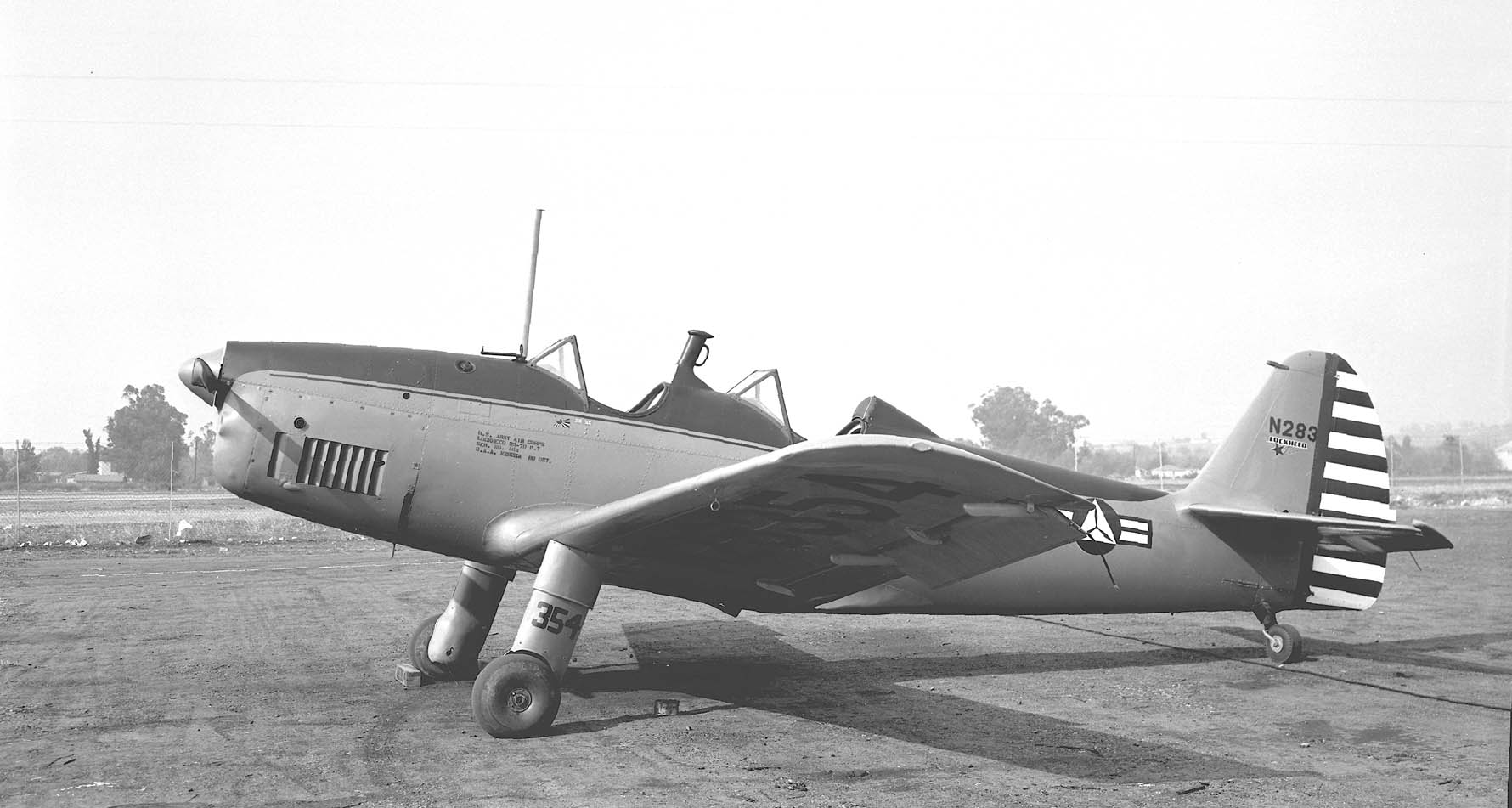
A Vega 35 operated by the Civil Air Patrol

The Vega Aircraft Corporation was a subsidiary of the Lockheed Aircraft Company in Burbank, California, responsible for much of its parent company's production in World War II.

== History ==
The company was first formed in August 1937 as the AiRover Company to produce a new light aircraft design. It was renamed in May 1938 to honor Lockheed's first aircraft design, the Vega.

The AiRover Model 1 was a Lockheed Altair fitted with a Menasco Unitwin 2-544 engine, which featured two engines driving a single shaft. The AiRover Model 2 was a new design named the Vega Starliner. One Starliner prototype was built and tested, but the design did not go into production.

In 1940, with World War II already underway in Europe, Vega changed its focus from light aircraft to military aircraft. The company began by producing five North American NA-35 trainers under license with North American Aviation. Production by Vega really got underway with the Hudson, a patrol bomber designed for use by the Royal Air Force.

Vega entered a partnership with Boeing and Douglas, under the abbreviation BVD, to produce the Boeing B-17 Flying Fortress. Of over 12,000 B-17s produced by war's end, 2,750 were built by Vega. The company also built two experimental B-17 variants, the Boeing XB-38 Flying Fortress and the Boeing YB-40 Flying Fortress.

By the end of November 1943, Vega had merged back into Lockheed, having far surpassed its original mission of producing light aircraft.

== Aircraft ==
Model name	First flight	Number built	Type
Vega Model 1	1938	1	Modified version of the Lockheed Altair
Vega Model 2 Starliner	1939	1	Prototype lightplane
Vega Model 40		5	Target drone
Vega 35		4	Development of the North American NA-35
Vega Hudson			License built version of Lockheed Hudson
Vega Ventura	1941	3,028	Twin engine medium/patrol bomber
Vega B-17 Flying Fortress	1942	2,750	License built version of Boeing B-17 Flying Fortress
Vega XB-38 Flying Fortress	1943	1	Modified version of the Boeing B-17 Flying Fortress with inline engines
Vega YB-40 Flying Fortress	1942	1	Modified version of the Boeing B-17 Flying Fortress to gunship configuration

== See also ==
- Lockheed Vega
- California during World War II
