= Hall Hibbard =

American aerospace engineer (1903–1996)

Hall Livingstone Hibbard (July 26, 1903 – June 6, 1996) was an engineer and administrator of the Lockheed Corporation beginning with the company's purchase by a board of investors led by Robert E. Gross in 1932. Born in Kansas, he received a bachelor's degree in mathematics and physics at the College of Emporia in 1925. He graduated from the Massachusetts Institute of Technology two years later. He worked for Stearman as a draftsman, before joining Robert Gross' Viking Flying Boat Company. He served on the board of the newly revived Lockheed Corporation and led the design departments as chief engineer. Engineers such as Clarence "Kelly" Johnson and Willis Hawkins worked under him.

He died in 1996 in Los Angeles at the age of 92.
