= George P. Putnam =

American publisher, writer, promoter, and explorer (1887–1950)

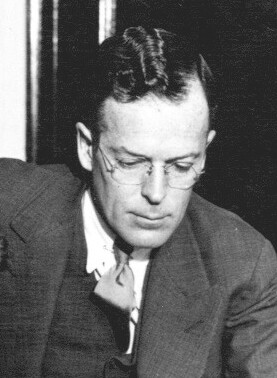
- Putnam in 1931
- Born: George Palmer Putnam; September 7, 1887; Rye, New York, U.S.
- Died: January 4, 1950 (aged 62); Trona, California, U.S.
- Occupations: Publisher; author; promoter
- Spouses: Dorothy Binney (m. 1911; div. 1929); Amelia Earhart (m. 1931, disappeared 1937); Jean-Marie Cosigny James (m. 1939; div. 1945); Margaret Havilland (m. 1945)
- Children: 2
- Father: John Bishop Putnam

George Palmer Putnam (September 7, 1887 – January 4, 1950) was an American publisher, writer, and explorer. Known for his marriage to (and being the widower of) Amelia Earhart, he also achieved fame as one of the most successful promoters in the United States during the 1930s.

== Early life ==
George Palmer Putnam was born in Rye, New York, on September 7, 1887, the son of John Bishop Putnam and the grandson of his namesake, George Palmer Putnam, founder of the prominent publishing firm that became G. P. Putnam's Sons. He studied at Harvard University and the University of California, Berkeley.

In 1912, Putnam married Dorothy Binney (1888–1982), the daughter of Edwin Binney, inventor and co-owner, with cousin C. Harold Smith, of Binney & Smith Inc., the company that made Crayola crayons. They had two sons, David Binney Putnam (1913–1992) and George Palmer Putnam Jr. (1921–2013), and for a time lived in Bend, Oregon, where Putnam was the publisher and editor of the local newspaper, the Bend Bulletin. He was mayor of Bend from 1912 to 1913. Putnam left Bend in 1915 to become the private secretary to Oregon Governor James Withycombe.

Within a few years, George and Dorothy moved to the East Coast, where Putnam entered the family publishing business in New York City.

During World War I, Putnam served with the United States Army field artillery. In 1926, under the sponsorship of the American Museum of Natural History, he led an expedition to the Arctic, up the west coast of Greenland. The following year he headed another expedition for the American Geographical Society to collect wildlife specimens on Baffin Island.

== 1920s and 1930s business interests ==
In July 1927 Putnam was responsible for the blockbuster publication of "WE", Charles Lindbergh's autobiographical account of his early life and his Orteig Prize-winning non-stop transatlantic solo flight from New York to Paris in May of that year. The book was one of the most successful non-fiction titles of all time, selling more than 650,000 copies in less than a year and earning its author over $250,000 (equivalent to $4,600,000 in 2025).

In 1927, Putnam's wife, Dorothy Binney, traveled to South America and began a long, well-chronicled affair with George Weymouth, a man 19 years her junior; Putnam would leave Binney two years later. Many thought that Putnam had left his first wife for Amelia Earhart, although for Binney, it was her own ticket out of an unhappy marriage.

In 1930, the various Putnam heirs voted to merge the family's publishing firm with Minton, Balch & Co., becoming the majority stockholders. Putnam resigned from his position as secretary of G. P. Putnam's Sons and joined New York publishers Brewer & Warren as vice president.

A significant event in Putnam's personal and business life occurred in 1928, before the merger. Because of his reputation for working with Lindbergh, he was contacted by Amy Phipps Guest, a wealthy American living in London, who wanted to sponsor the first-ever flight by a woman across the Atlantic Ocean.

Guest asked Putnam to find a suitable candidate, and he eventually came up with the then-unknown aviator, Amelia Earhart. As it turned out, they shared many common interests: hiking, swimming, camping, riding, tennis and golf. When Putnam first met Earhart, he was still married to Binney. After Earhart completed her flight across the Atlantic, Putnam offered to help her write a book about it, following the formula he had established with Lindbergh in the writing of "WE". The resulting Earhart book was 20 Hrs. 40 Min. (1928).

When they began writing, Putnam invited Earhart to live in his home, because he felt it would make the process easier. Shortly after, Binney left for South America. Putnam and Binney divorced in 1929. Putnam had undertaken to promote Earhart in a campaign that included lecture tours and mass-market endorsements for luggage, Lucky Strike cigarettes (this caused image problems for her, and McCall's magazine retracted an offer) and other products.

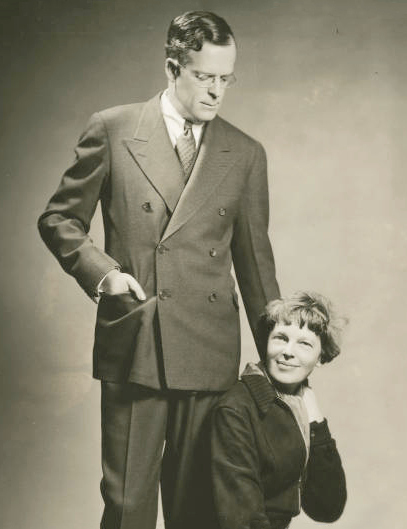
Putnam with his wife Amelia Earhart, c. 1935

Putnam and Earhart made their relationship official shortly after his divorce was finalized, but they didn't marry until 1931. Earhart's ideas on marriage were liberal for the time, as she believed in equal responsibilities for both "breadwinners" and pointedly kept her own surname. GP, as she called him, soon learned that he would be called "Mr. Earhart". (Note: When The New York Times, per the rules of its stylebook, insisted on referring to her as Mrs. Putnam, she laughed it off.")

There was no honeymoon for the newlyweds because Earhart was involved in a nine-day cross-country tour promoting autogyros and the tour sponsor, Beech-Nut chewing gum. Although the couple had no children, he had two sons by his first marriage, explorer and writer David Binney Putnam (1913–1992) and businessman George Palmer Putnam Jr. (1921–2013). Earhart was especially fond of David, who frequently visited his father at their family home in Rye, New York. George had contracted polio shortly after his parents' separation and was unable to visit as often.

Following Earhart's successful 1932 solo transatlantic flight, Putnam again organized her public engagements and speaking tour across the United States. Earhart joined the faculty of Purdue University College of Technology in 1935 as a visiting faculty member to counsel women on careers and as a technical advisor to the Department of Aeronautics.

Earhart disappeared in 1937 while on her second attempt to complete a circumnavigational flight of the globe. In addition to her first work, Putnam published two other books Earhart wrote about flying, The Fun of It (1932), a memoir of her flying experiences and an essay on women in aviation and Last Flight (1937), consisting of letters and memorandum compiled by Putnam after her disappearance. Putnam also published her biography in 1939 under the title Soaring Wings: A Biography of Amelia Earhart. Although a major blaze at the Putnam residence in Rye destroyed many family treasures and Earhart's personal mementos, Putnam later donated some of Earhart's belongings, including photographs, private letters, and a flight jacket, to Purdue University, where she had worked as a career counselor. Other personal effects were sent to the Women's Archives in New York.

Putnam had Earhart declared dead on January 5, 1939, remarrying on May 21 of that year to Jean-Marie Cosigny James.

== Later years ==
In 1938, Putnam set up a new publishing company in California: George Palmer Putnam Inc. With America's entry into World War II in 1941, Putnam resumed active service, joining an intelligence unit as a captain and rising to the rank of major by 1942. In 1945, he and "Jeannie" divorced; she had initiated the action, citing incompatibility. Shortly after, he remarried again, to Margaret Havilland. They operated the Stove Pipe Wells resort in Death Valley, California.

In the book Death Valley Handbook (1947), Putnam was the binomial author of the plant taxon Gilia mohavensis (H.Mason) Putnam. The name has since slipped into synonymy with Linanthus mohavensis H.Mason, its basionym (or original species name).

George Putnam authored a number of books, including:

- Death Valley and Its Country (1946)
- Death Valley Handbook (1947)
- Hickory Shirt (1948)
- Hot Oil (1935)
- In the Oregon Country: Out-doors in Oregon, Washington, and California, Together with some Legendary Lore, and Glimpses of the Modern West in the Making (1915)
- Smiting the Rock: A tale of Oregon (1918) (Note: Written under the pseudonym "Palmer Bend".)
- Soaring Wings: A Biography of Amelia Earhart (1939)
- Wide Margins (1942 autobiography)
- Duration (1943 novel about the WWII home front in Washington, D.C.)
- Up In Our Country (1950)

== Death ==
In late 1949, Putnam fell ill at his home in the Stove Pipe Wells, California, resort in Death Valley, suffering from kidney failure. He died in Trona, California, on January 4, 1950, aged 62. His body was cremated and the ashes interred in the Chapel of the Pines Crematory in Los Angeles.

== Honors ==
Amelia Earhart, Putnam's second wife, was the first president of The Ninety-Nines, an organization of (originally) 99 female pilots formed in 1929 for the support and advancement of aviation. Putnam had proposed an award as a means of honoring anyone who supports an individual member of the group (known as a "49½"), a Chapter or Section, or the organization as a whole. The "George Palmer Putnam 49½ Award" was originated to recognize such exceptional support of The Ninety-Nines.

In 1927, the Boy Scouts of America made Putnam an "Honorary Scout", a new category of Scout created that same year. This distinction was given to "American citizens whose achievements in outdoor activity, exploration and worthwhile adventure are of such an exceptional character as to capture the imagination of boys...". (Note: The other 18 who were awarded this distinction were: Roy Chapman Andrews, Robert Bartlett, Frederick Russell Burnham, Richard E. Byrd, George Kruck Cherrie, James L. Clark, Merian C. Cooper; Lincoln Ellsworth, Louis Agassiz Fuertes, George Bird Grinnell, Charles A. Lindbergh, Donald Baxter MacMillan, Clifford H. Pope, Kermit Roosevelt, Carl Rungius, Stewart Edward White and Orville Wright.)

Due to his relationship with Amelia Earhart, Putnam has been the subject of numerous feature and documentary films including: Amelia Earhart (1976) with John Forsythe portraying Putnam. In Amelia Earhart: The Final Flight (1994), Bruce Dern played him. The documentary Amelia Earhart: The Price of Courage (1993) from American Experience also featured the Putnam-Earhart marriage. Laurie Gwen Shapiro's 2025 book "The Aviator and the Showman: Amelia Earhart, George Putnam, and the Marriage That Made an American Icon" covered their relationship in detail. Richard Gere portrayed Putnam in the 2009 movie, Amelia.

== Popular culture ==
In Flying Blind, a "Nathan Heller" novel by Max Allan Collins, George Putnam is a major character, but is portrayed as a villain using Earhart for his own purposes.

In the 2009 film Amelia, Putnam is portrayed by the actor Richard Gere.
