= Muriel Earhart Morrissey =

US author and activist, sister of Amelia Earhart

- Born: Grace Muriel Earhart; December 29, 1899; Kansas City
- Died: March 2, 1998 (aged 98)
- Citizenship: USA
- Education: Radcliffe College
- Spouse: Henry Albert Morrissey
- Children: 2
- Relatives: Amelia Earhart
- Writing career
- Language: English

Muriel Earhart Morrissey (December 29, 1899 – March 2, 1998), the younger sister of aviator Amelia Earhart, was a high school teacher, author, and activist. After her sister disappeared on a flight across the Pacific in 1937, Earhart spent decades biographing Amelia's life and managing her legacy. Earhart also taught at the high schools in the Boston suburbs of Medford and Belmont, and she remained an active member of the Medford community until her death.

== Personal life ==
Grace Muriel Earhart was born in Kansas City on December 29, 1899, two years after her sister Amelia, to parents Edwin and Amy Earhart. The sisters had a turbulent childhood, filled with trips back and forth between their grandparents’ house in Atchison, Kansas and their parents’ home in Kansas City. Earhart's father was an alcoholic.

The sisters were close and loved playing outdoor games, sledding, and spending time with animals. Both relocated to the Boston area after they grew up, and Muriel Earhart spent most of her life in Medford, Massachusetts. She married Henry Albert Morrissey, a World War I veteran, in 1929. They were married for 50 years until his death in 1979. They had two children, one of whom, David Allyn Morrissey (1930-1978), predeceased his parents.

Earhart attended Smith College and received a degree from Radcliffe College in 1960 per the Harvard University alumni database.

Additionally, she studied at Saint Margaret's School in Toronto, where in 1917 she was visited by Amelia who decided to stay to help with the war effort, and got a job at the Spadina Military Hospital. While in Toronto, Amelia and Muriel were surrounded by pilots, as the city was "the undeclared capital of flying in the British Empire." It has been said that Amelia fell in love with flying. "The interest aroused in me in Toronto led me to all the air circuses in the vicinity," Amelia once told reporters.

== Historical work and writings on Amelia Earhart ==
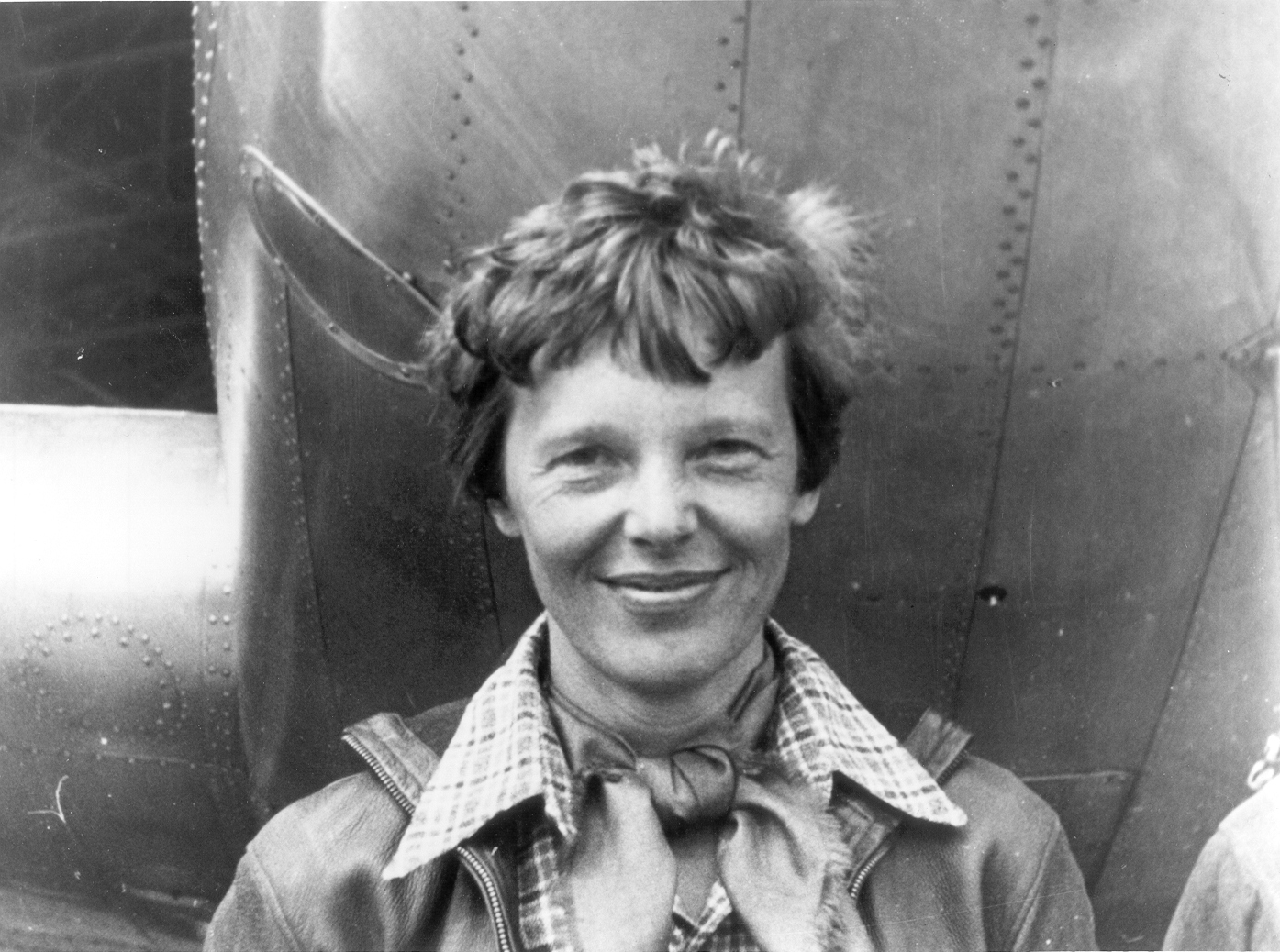
Amelia Earhart standing under nose of her Lockheed Model 10-E Electra, 1937.

After Amelia Earhart's 1937 disappearance, Muriel Earhart's life took on a new dimension. Earhart devoted significant time to coordinating Amelia's posthumous affairs, setting up donations, marshalling information, and dealing with Amelia's fans. She corresponded with museums, aviation clubs, the U.S. Air Force, and Eleanor Roosevelt.

She spoke out against the speculations that arose in the wake of Amelia's death. She denied, for example, that her sister died while on a spy mission, as some have suggested.

Earhart wrote two books about her sister: Courage is the Price and Amelia, My Courageous Sister. The last known 1935 Lockheed Electra L-10E — the type of plane Amelia flew in 1937 — is named after Muriel Earhart.

== Other work ==
In addition to writing about her sister, Muriel Earhart wrote a biography of her husband detailing his experiences during World War I. The biography is titled The Quest of A Prince of Mystic: Henry Albert Morrissey "The Chief". She also wrote poetry.

In Medford, Earhart was a charter member of the Medford Zonta Club, a School Committee member, a League of Women Voters member, a member of the Daughters of the American Revolution, and member of the Medford Historical Society. In 1979, Earhart was Medford’s Citizen of the Year.

Earhart taught English in Belmont and Medford, where she won several teaching awards. One of her students, Massachusetts state representative Wayne Burton, wrote in a local newspaper that Earhart changed his life. “We all remember that one extraordinary teacher who stays with us always, reminding us to settle for nothing less than our best. Muriel Morrissey is mine. In her own way like her sister, she deserves acclaim for her positive influence on the hundreds of students fortunate to experience her dedication to their educational success", Burton wrote.
