= Margaret Bartlett Thornton =

American pilot and poet (1901–1981)

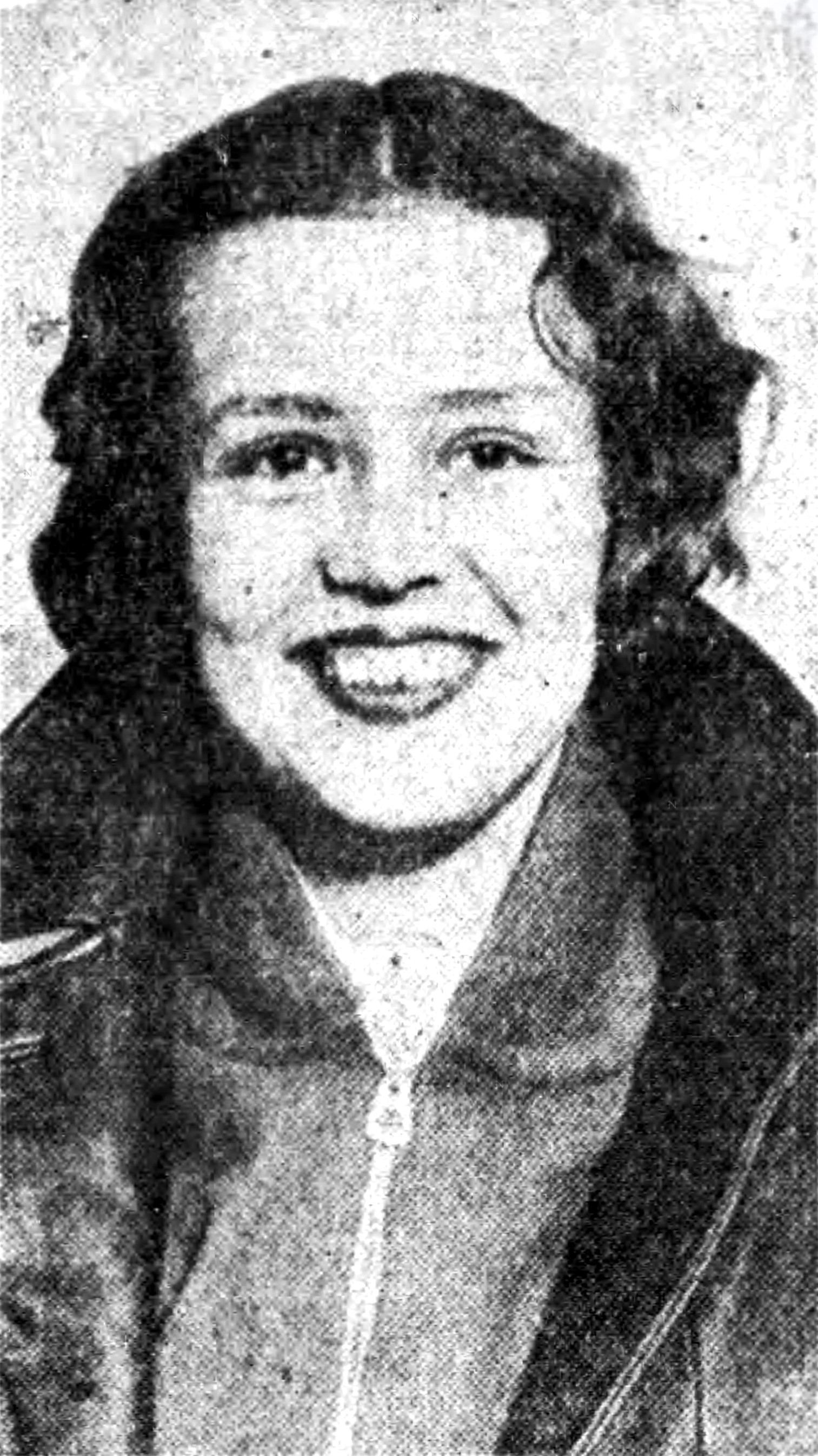
- Bartlett in 1930
- Born: Margaret Bartlett; November 19, 1901; Tonopah, Nevada
- Died: January 3, 1981 (aged 79); Las Vegas, Nevada
- Occupations: Aviation promotor; poet; editor
- Father: George A. Bartlett

Margaret "Monte" Bartlett Thornton (née Bartlett; 19 November 1901 – 3 January 1981) was a pilot, editor, and poet. In 1928 she flew as a passenger in an airmail biplane from New York to Oakland, using the trip to promote the work of airmail pilots. She flew across the continent a second time in April 1928, breaking the transcontinental air mail passenger record. In 1928 she began flying lessons and earned her pilot's license. When a heart condition prevented her from flying, she became a promoter of aviation alongside Amelia Earhart. Thornton was also a published poet.

== Biography ==
Thornton was born on 19 November 1901 in Tonopah, Nevada to George A. Bartlett and Pearl Bartlett, and had two sisters and a brother. For two years she attended Dominican College in San Rafael, California, and later graduated from the University of Nevada. She married Richard W. Millar in 1930, but the two later divorced. She later married William Robert Thornton, a marriage which ended in 1962. Thornton died on 3 January 1981 at Sunrise Hospital in Las Vegas.

== Career ==
=== Aviation ===
Thornton was a pioneer in women's aviation, which led to her befriending both Amelia Earhart and Charles Lindbergh. In 1928 she became the second woman to travel on a commercial trans-American flight when she carried air mail from New York to Nevada. One of the first women in the United States to get her pilot's license, it was later revoked due to medical issues, ending her career in flight. She was then employed as an air travel advocate, traveling the west coast to boost interest in passenger air travel. Later she worked for T-A-T Maddux as a traffic agent, alongside Amelia Earhart.

=== Literature ===
Thornton's Women's response to aviation was published in Aeronautic Review in 1928. She was editor of the 1931 book, written by her father, Men, Women and Conflict, which was reissued in 1947 as Is Marriage Necessary? Thornton wrote poetry and had several works published, including one in the Saturday Review of Literature. Later in her life she published a book of her own poetry titled Winter of Noon.
