= 20 Hrs. 40 Min. =

1928 book by Amelia Earhart

20 Hrs. 40 Min.: Our Flight in the Friendship
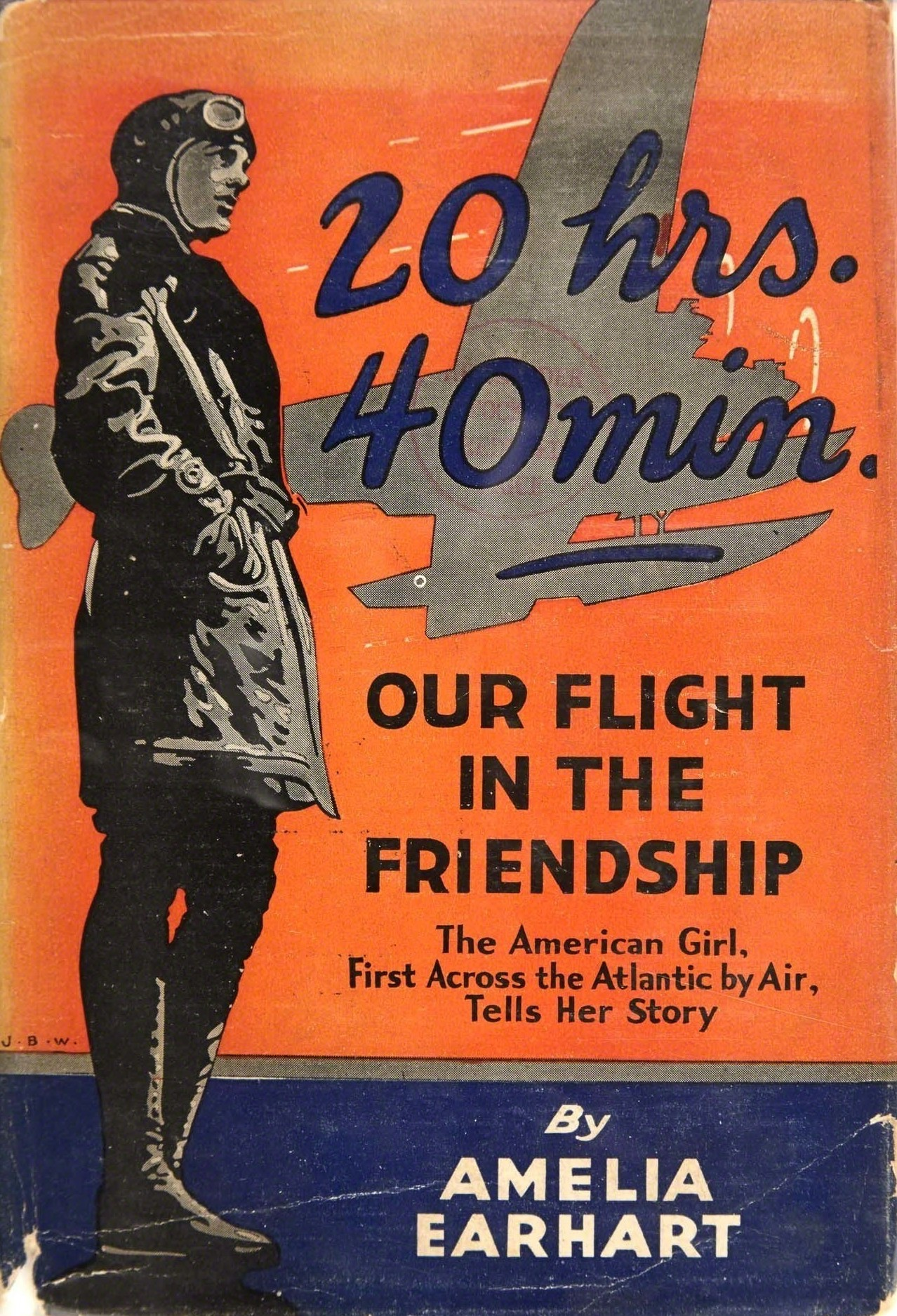
- Author: Amelia Earhart
- Language: English
- Genre: Travelogue, memoir
- Publisher: Harcourt, Brace and Company
- Publication date: 1928
- Publication place: United States
- Media type: Print (Paperback and hardcover)

20 Hrs. 40 Min.: Our Flight in the Friendship is a book written by pioneering aviator Amelia Earhart. It was first published in 1928 by G. P. Putnam's Sons, but has continued to be reprinted in periodic new editions. A special "Author's Autograph Edition" of 150 signed and numbered copies was also produced in 1928. Each copy of this special edition contained a miniature silk American flag carried by Earhart in her flight on the Friendship from Boston to Burry Port, Wales.

In this book, Earhart writes about her experiences aboard the 1928 transatlantic flight of the Friendship, which made her the first woman to cross the Atlantic Ocean by air. The flight, in which Earhart was a passenger, was piloted by Wilmer Stultz and Louis Gordon. Earhart combines actual log entries made during the flight with recollections of her childhood and how she first became interested in aviation.

Towards the end of the book, Earhart has a chapter entitled "Women in Aviation". In this chapter she writes,

Possibly the feature of aviation which may appeal most to thoughtful women is its potentiality for peace. The term is not merely an airy phrase. Isolation breeds distrust and differences of outlook. Anything which tends to annihilate distance destroys isolation, and brings the world and its peoples closer together. I think aviation has a chance to increase intimacy, understanding, and far-flung friendships thus.

20 Hrs. 40 Min. was the first of two books Earhart would write in her lifetime; the other being 1932's The Fun of It. A third book credited to her, Last Flight, was published posthumously and consisted of diary entries from her ill-fated 1937 flight around the world.

National Geographic republished the work in 2003 under its National Geographic Adventure Classics imprint.
