= The Fun of It =

1932 book by Amelia Earhart

- 1977 Academy Press edition
- Author: Amelia Earhart
- Language: English
- Genre: memoir; biography
- Publisher: Harcourt, Brace and Company
- Publication date: 1932
- Publication place: United States
- Media type: Print (Papers of My Own Flying and of Women in Aviation), 1932. Amelia Earhart

The Fun of It is Amelia Earhart's second book after her travelogue 20 Hrs. 40 Min.

== Summary ==
In it, Earhart recollects how she became interested in being an aviator, as well as becoming aviation editor for Cosmopolitan Magazine. She recounts her 1928 trans-Atlantic flight.

She also profiles the careers of other pioneering female flyers of her time. Earhart encourages young women to follow their own careers and dreams. The title comes from her quote "Flying may not be all plain sailing, but the fun of it is worth the price."

Earhart's next book, Last Flight, would be published posthumously.

== Development ==
Earhart went over the proofs for the book in the days before her solo transatlantic flight in May 1932.

== Lecture Tour ==
In 1933 Earhart went on a lecture tour to promote the book. One of her stops was in Seattle, Washington.
