= Amelia Earhart =

American aviation pioneer (1897–disappeared 1937)

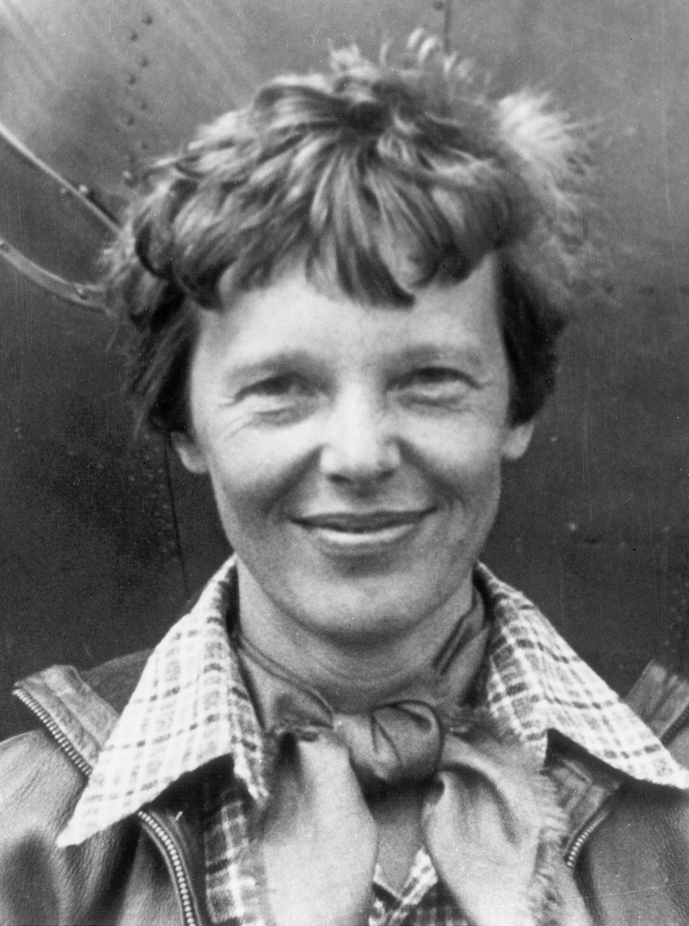
- Earhart beneath the nose of her Lockheed Model 10-E Electra, March 1937 in Oakland, California, before departing on her final round-the-world attempt prior to her disappearance
- Born: Amelia Mary Earhart; July 24, 1897; Atchison, Kansas, U.S.
- Disappeared: July 2, 1937 (aged 39); Pacific Ocean (Note: En route to Howland Island from Lae, New Guinea)
- Status: Declared dead in absentia January 5, 1939 (aged 41)
- Occupations: Aviator; author
- Known for: Many early aviation records, including first woman to fly solo across the Atlantic Ocean
- Spouse: George P. Putnam (m. 1931)
- Awards: Distinguished Flying Cross; Légion d'honneur; National Aviation Hall of Fame; National Women's Hall of Fame
- Website: www.ameliaearhart.com

Amelia Mary Earhart (/ˈɛərhɑːrt/ AIR-hart; born July 24, 1897; disappeared July 2, 1937; declared dead January 5, 1939) was an American aviator who became one of the most celebrated aviation pioneers.

In 1928, Earhart was the first woman to cross the Atlantic by airplane. In 1932, she became the first woman to make a nonstop solo transatlantic flight, and was awarded the Distinguished Flying Cross for her achievement. She was one of the first aviators to promote commercial air travel, wrote best-selling books about her flying experiences, and helped found the Ninety-Nines, an organization for women pilots.

On July 2, 1937, Earhart and her navigator Fred Noonan disappeared over the Pacific Ocean in a twin-engine Lockheed Model 10 Electra while attempting to become the first female pilot to circumnavigate the world. Since her disappearance, Earhart has become a global cultural figure and numerous films, documentaries, and books have recounted her life.

== Early life ==
=== Childhood ===
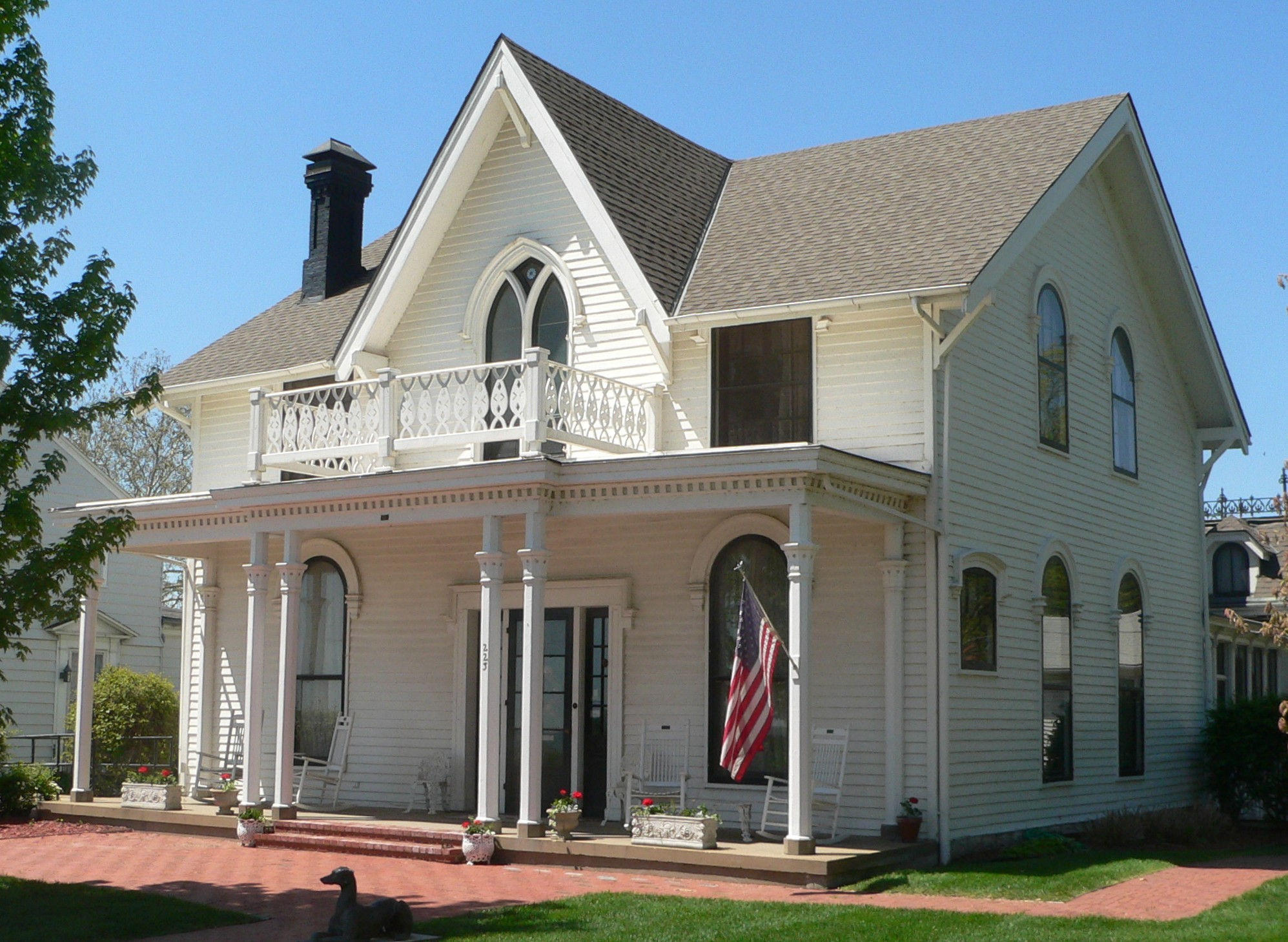
Earhart's birthplace

Amelia Mary Earhart was born on July 24, 1897, in Atchison, Kansas, the daughter of Samuel "Edwin" Stanton Earhart (1867–1930) and Amelia "Amy" Earhart (née Otis; 1869–1962). She was born in the home of her maternal grandfather Alfred Gideon Otis (1827–1912), who was a former judge in Kansas, the president of Atchison Savings Bank, and a leading resident of the town. Earhart was the second child of the marriage after a stillbirth in August 1896. She was of part German descent. Alfred had not initially favored the marriage and was not satisfied with Edwin's progress as a lawyer.

Following family custom, Earhart was named after her two grandmothers, Amelia Josephine Harres and Mary Wells Patton. From an early age, she was the dominant sibling, while her sister Grace Muriel Earhart (1899–1998), two years her junior, acted as a dutiful follower. Earhart was nicknamed "Meeley" and sometimes "Millie", and Grace was nicknamed "Pidge." Both continued to answer to their childhood nicknames into adulthood. Their upbringing was unconventional; Amy did not believe in raising her children to be "nice little girls". Their maternal grandmother disapproved of the bloomers they wore, and although Earhart liked the freedom of movement they provided, she was aware that the neighborhood girls wore dresses.

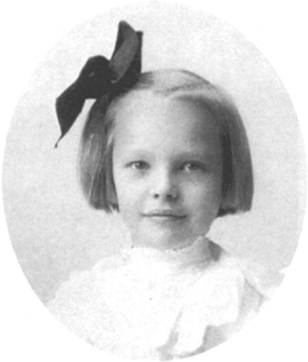
Earhart as a child

The Earhart children had a spirit of adventure and explored their neighborhood daily. As a child, Earhart spent hours playing with Pidge, climbing trees, hunting rats with a rifle, and sledding downhill. Some biographers have characterized her as a tomboy. The girls kept worms, moths, katydids, and a tree toad in a growing collection. In 1904, with the help of her uncle, Earhart constructed a homemade ramp modeled after a roller coaster she had seen on a trip to St. Louis, Missouri, and secured it to the roof of the family tool shed. After her first documented "flight", she emerged from the broken wooden box that had served as a sled with a bruised lip, a torn dress, and a "sensation of exhilaration", saying, "Oh, Pidge, it's just like flying!"

In 1907, Edwin's job as a claims officer for the Rock Island Railroad led to a transfer to Des Moines, Iowa. The following year, at the age of 10, Earhart saw her first aircraft at the Iowa State Fair in Des Moines. Her father tried to interest his daughters in taking a flight, but after looking at the rickety "flivver", Earhart asked if they could return to the merry‑go‑round. She later described the biplane as "a thing of rusty wire and wood and not at all interesting".

=== Education ===
Earhart and her sister remained with their grandparents in Atchison while their parents moved into new, smaller quarters in Des Moines. During this period, the girls received homeschooling from their mother and a governess. Earhart later said she was "exceedingly fond of reading" and spent many hours in the large family library. In 1909, when the family was reunited in Des Moines, the sisters were enrolled in public school for the first time, and Earhart, 12, entered seventh grade.

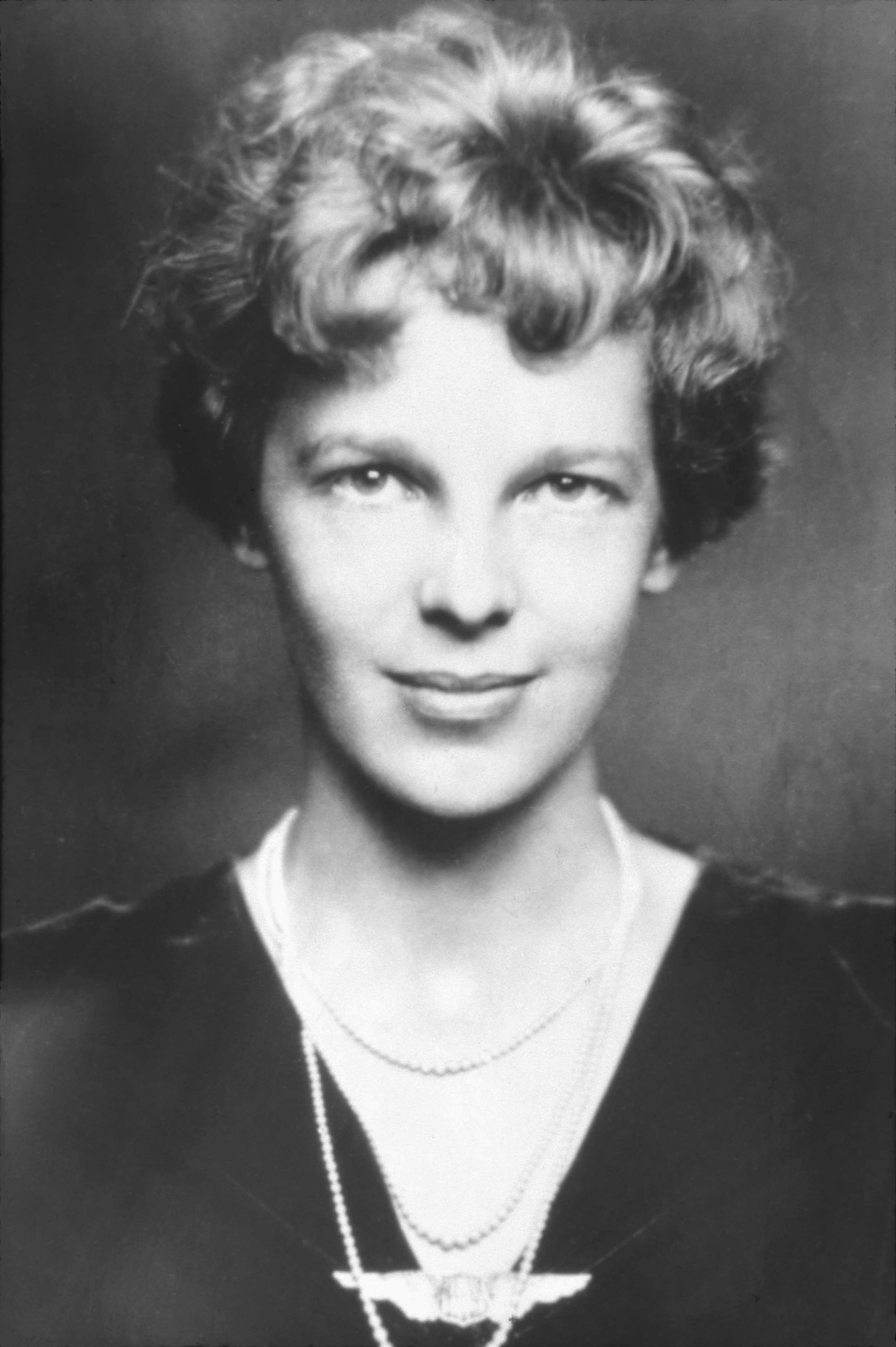
Earhart in evening clothes

The Earhart family's finances appeared to improved with the acquisition of a new house and the hiring of two servants, but it soon became clear that Edwin was an alcoholic. In 1914, he was forced to retire. He attempted to rehabilitate himself through treatment, but the Rock Island Railroad never reinstated him. At about this time, Earhart's maternal grandmother died. She left a substantial estate and placed her daughter's share in a trust, fearing that Edwin's drinking would exhaust the funds. The Otis house was auctioned along with its contents, and Earhart later described these events as the end of her childhood.

In 1915, after a long search, Edwin found work as a clerk at the Great Northern Railway in St. Paul, Minnesota, where Earhart entered Central High School as a junior. Edwin applied for a transfer to Springfield, Missouri, in 1915, but the current claims officer reconsidered his retirement and demanded his job back, leaving Edwin unemployed. Amy took her children to Chicago, where they lived with friends. Earhart canvassed nearby high schools in Chicago to find the best science program. She rejected the high school nearest her home, complaining that the chemistry lab was "just like a kitchen sink". She eventually enrolled in Hyde Park High School but spent a miserable semester, for which a yearbook caption noted: "A.E.—the girl in brown who walks alone".

Earhart graduated from Hyde Park High School in 1916. Throughout her childhood, she had continued to aspire to a future career. She kept a scrapbook of newspaper clippings about successful women in male-dominated careers, including film direction and production, law, advertising, management, and mechanical engineering. She began junior college at Ogontz School in Rydal, Pennsylvania, but did not complete her program.

=== Nursing career and illness ===
During Christmas vacation in 1917, Earhart visited her sister in Toronto, Canada, where she saw wounded soldiers returning from World War I. After receiving training as a nurse's aide from the Red Cross, Earhart began working with the Voluntary Aid Detachment at Spadina Military Hospital, where her duties included food preparation for patients with special diets and handing out prescribed medication in the hospital's dispensary. There, she heard stories from military pilots and developed an interest in flying.

In 1918, when the 1918 Flu Pandemic reached Toronto, Earhart was engaged in nursing duties that included night shifts at Spadina Military Hospital. In early November that year, she became infected and was hospitalized for pneumonia and maxillary sinusitis. She was discharged in December 1918, about two months later. Her sinus-related symptoms included pain and pressure around one eye and copious mucus drainage through the nostrils and throat. During her stay in the hospital in the pre-antibiotic era, Earhart underwent painful minor operations to wash out the affected maxillary sinus, but these procedures were not successful and her headaches worsened. Her convalescence lasted nearly a year, which she spent at her sister's home in Northampton, Massachusetts. She passed the time reading poetry, learning to play the banjo, and studying mechanics. Chronic sinusitis significantly affected Earhart's flying and other activities in later life, and she sometimes wore a bandage on her cheek to cover a small drainage tube.

By 1919, Earhart prepared to enter Smith College, where her sister was a student, but she changed her mind and enrolled in a course of medical studies and other programs at Columbia University. She quit her studies a year later to be with her parents, who had reunited in California.

=== Early flying experiences ===
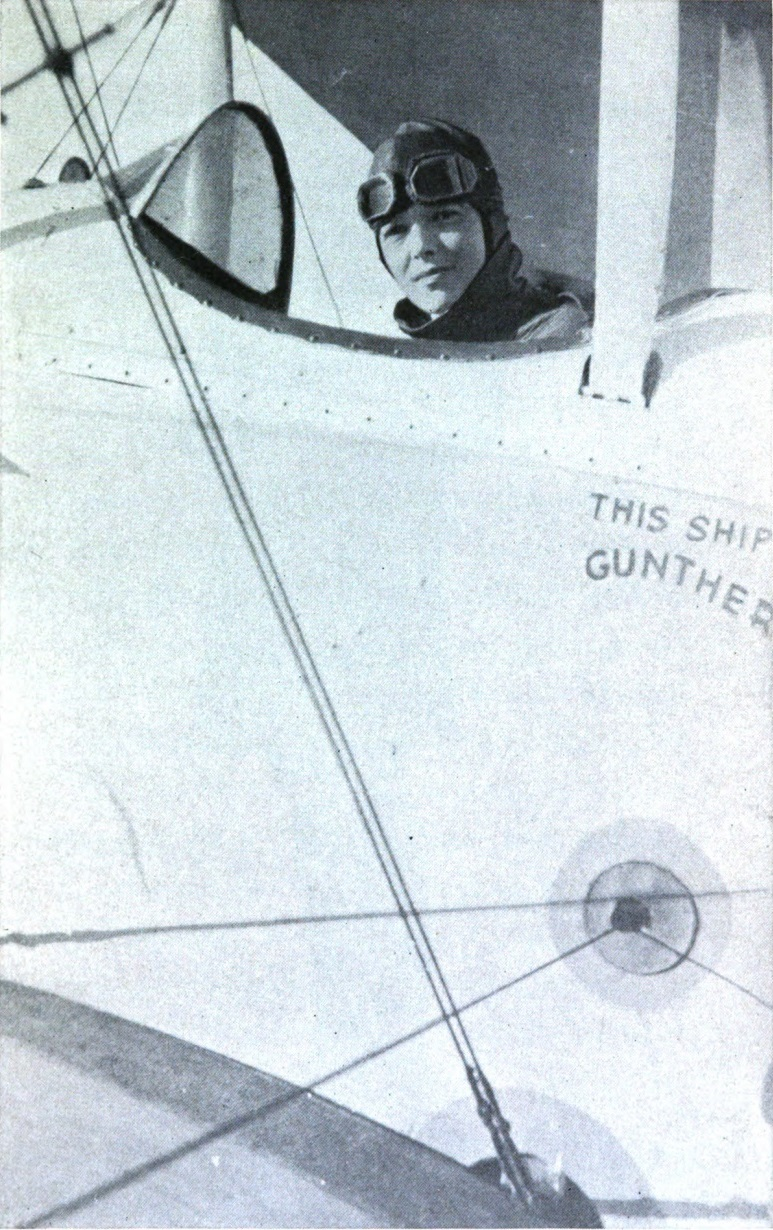
Earhart in her first training plane, 1920

In the early 1920s, Earhart and a young woman friend visited an air fair held in conjunction with the Canadian National Exhibition in Toronto; she said, "The interest, aroused in me, in Toronto, led me to all the air circuses in the vicinity." One of the highlights of the day was a flying exhibition put on by a World War I ace. The pilot saw Earhart and her friend, who were watching from an isolated clearing, and dived at them. "I am sure he said to himself, 'Watch me make them scamper,' " she said. Earhart stood her ground as the aircraft came close. "I did not understand it at the time," she said, "but I believe that little red airplane said something to me as it swished by."

On December 28, 1920, Earhart and her father attended an "aerial meet" at Daugherty Field in Long Beach, California. She asked her father to inquire about passenger flights and flying lessons. Earhart was booked for a passenger flight the following day at Emory Roger's Field, at the corner of Wilshire Boulevard and Fairfax Avenue. A 10-minute flight with Frank Hawks, who later gained fame as an air racer, cost $10 (equivalent to $160 in 2025). The ride with Hawks changed Earhart's life; she said, "By the time I had got two or three hundred feet [60–90 m] off the ground ... I knew I had to fly."

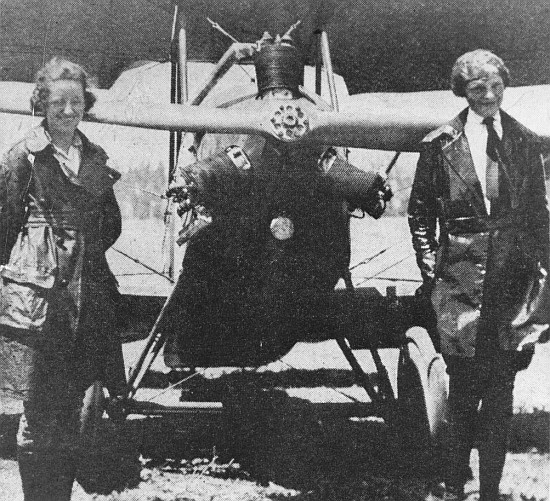
L–R: Neta Snook, Earhart's Kinner Airster and Earhart, c. 1921

The next month, Earhart engaged Neta Snook to be her flying instructor. The initial contract was for 12 hours of instruction for $500 (equivalent to $9,000 in 2025). Working at a variety of jobs, including photographer, truck driver, and stenographer at the local telephone company, Earhart saved $1,000 (equivalent to $18,000 in 2025) for flying lessons; she had her first lesson on January 3, 1921, at Kinner Field on the west side of Long Beach Boulevard and Tweedy Road, now in the city of South Gate. Snook used a crash-salvaged Curtiss JN-4 "Canuck" airplane she had restored for training. To reach the airfield, Earhart had to take a bus then walk four miles (6.4 km). Earhart's mother provided part of the $1,000 "stake" against her "better judgement". Earhart cropped her hair short in the style of other female flyers. Six months later, in mid 1921 and against Snook's advice, Earhart purchased a secondhand, chromium yellow Kinner Airster biplane, which she nicknamed "The Canary". After her first successful solo landing, she bought a new leather flying coat. Because the coat looked new, she was teased, so she aged it by sleeping in it and staining it with aircraft oil.

On October 22, 1922, Earhart flew the Airster to an altitude of 14,000 feet (4,300 m), setting a world record for female pilots. On May 16, 1923, she became the 16th woman in the United States to be issued a pilot's license (#6017) by the Fédération Aéronautique Internationale (FAI).

=== Financial problems and move to Massachusetts ===
Throughout the early 1920s, following a disastrous investment in a failed gypsum mine, Earhart's inheritance from her grandmother, which her mother was administering, steadily diminished until it was exhausted. Consequently, with no immediate prospect of recouping her investment in flying, Earhart sold the Canary and a second Kinner and bought a yellow Kissel Gold Bug "Speedster", a two-seat automobile she named "Yellow Peril". At the same time, pain from her old sinus problem worsened, and in early 1924, she was hospitalized for another sinus operation, which was again unsuccessful. She tried a number of ventures, including setting up a photography company.

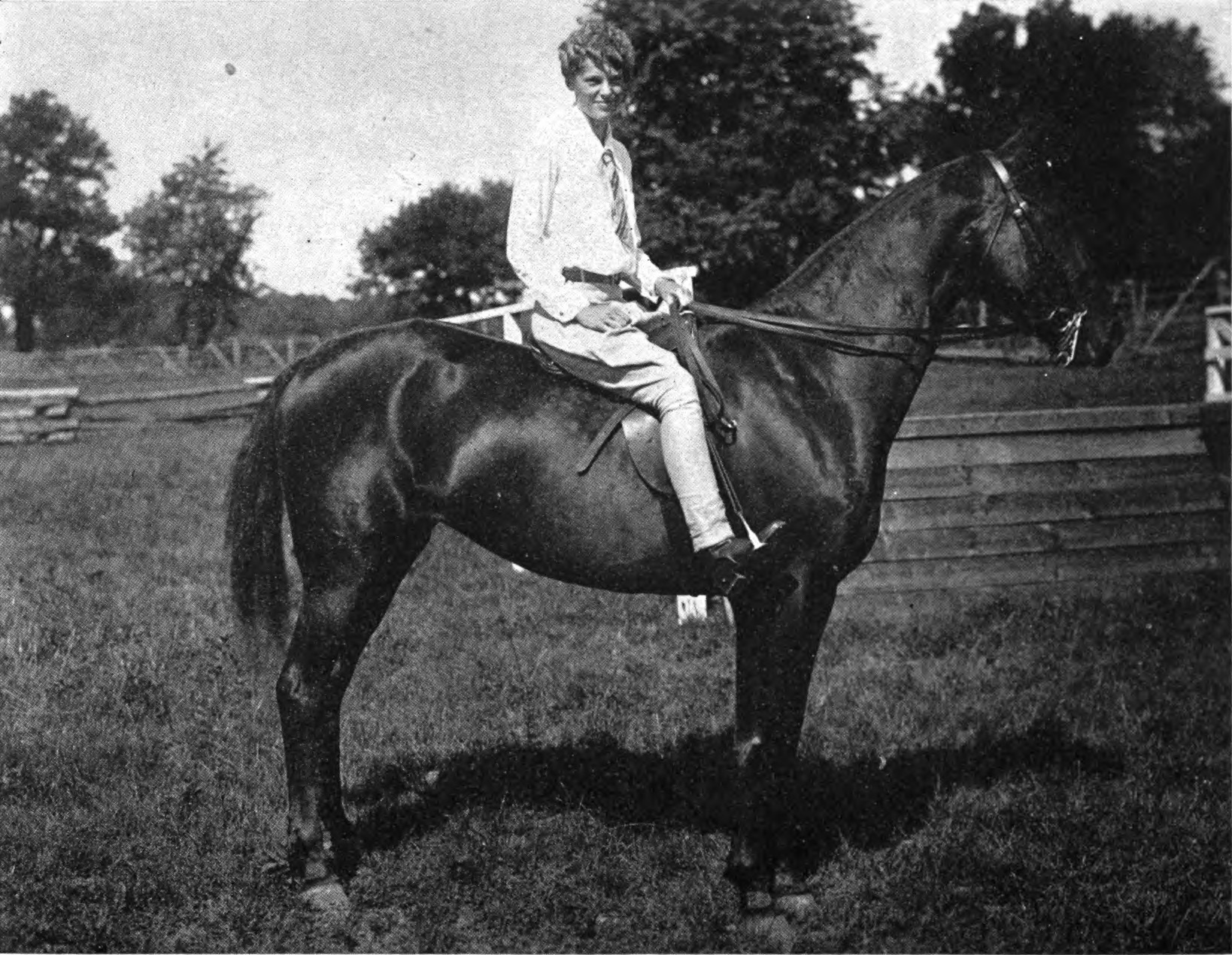
Photo of Earhart from her book 20 Hrs. 40 Min. (1928)

Following her parents' divorce in 1924, Earhart drove her mother in "Yellow Peril" on a transcontinental trip from California with stops throughout the western United States and northward to Banff, Alberta, Canada.

Their journey ended in Boston, Massachusetts, where Earhart underwent another, more successful sinus operation. After recuperation, she returned to Columbia University for several months but was forced to abandon her studies and any further plans for enrolling at the Massachusetts Institute of Technology (MIT), because her mother could no longer afford the tuition fees and associated costs.

In 1925, Earhart found employment first as a teacher and then as a social worker at Denison House, a Boston settlement house. At this time, she lived in Medford, Massachusetts.

While living in Medford, she maintained her interest in aviation, becoming a member of the American Aeronautical Society's Boston chapter and eventually being elected its vice president. She flew out of Dennison Airport in Quincy, helped finance the airport's operation by investing a small sum of money, and in 1927, she flew the first official flight out of Dennison Airport.

Earhart worked as a sales representative for Kinner Aircraft in the Boston area and wrote local-newspaper columns promoting flying; as her local celebrity grew, she made plans to launch an organization for female flyers.

== Records and achievements ==
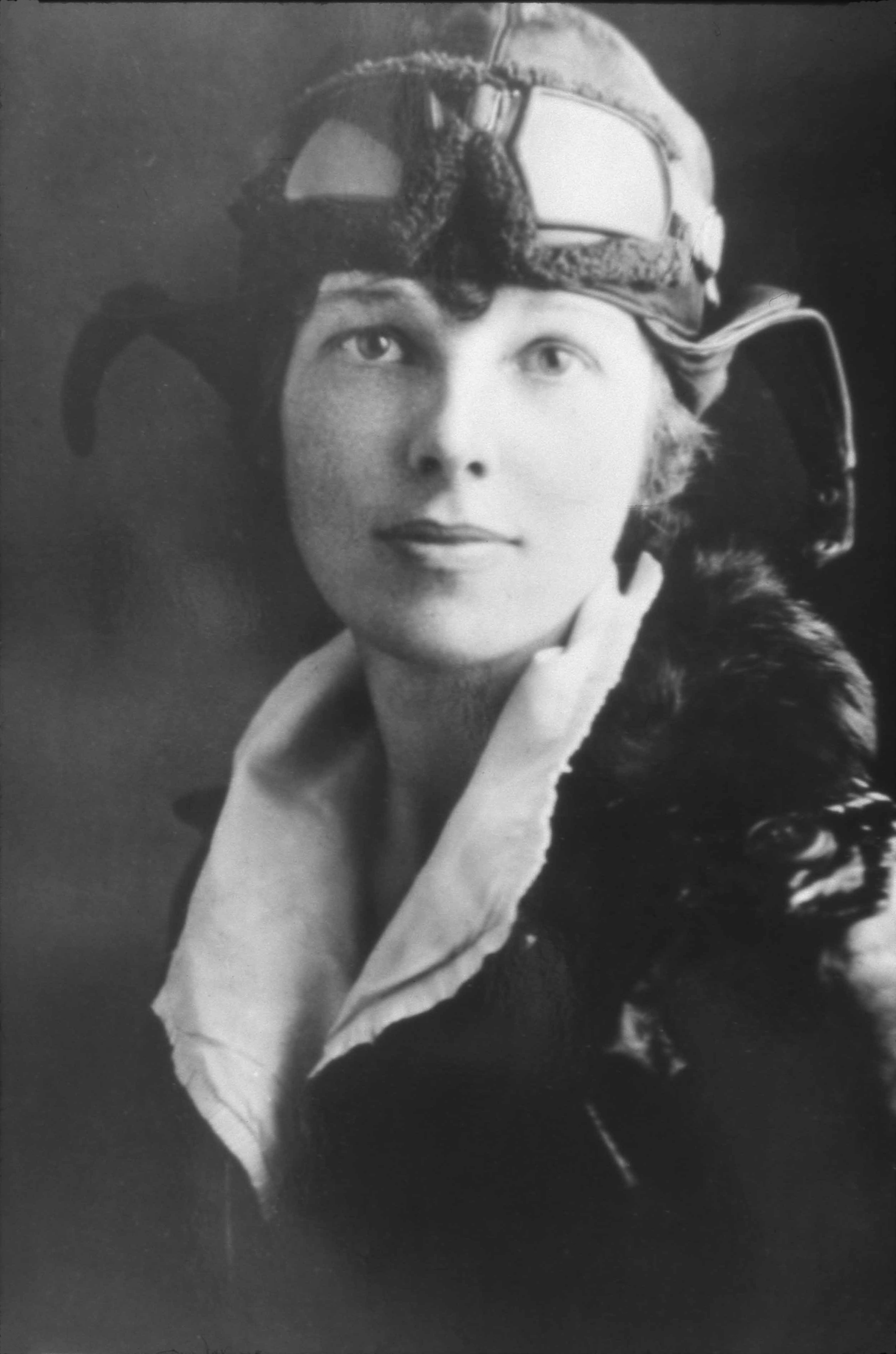
Photo from Earhart's pilot license #6017 that is permanently housed at the Ninety-Nines Museum of Women Pilots

=== Historic aviation firsts – women ===
- First woman to fly the Atlantic Ocean (1928)
- First woman to fly an autogyro (1931)
- First woman to cross the United States in an autogyro (1931)
- First woman to fly the Atlantic solo (1932)
- First woman to fly nonstop, coast-to-coast across the U.S. (1932)

=== Historic aviation firsts – overall ===
- First person to fly the Atlantic twice (1932)
- First person to fly solo between Honolulu, Hawaii, and Oakland, California (1935)
- First person to fly solo from Los Angeles to Mexico City (1935)
- First person to fly solo nonstop from Mexico City to Newark, New Jersey (1935)
- First person to fly solo from the Red Sea to Karachi (1937)

=== Speed and altitude records – women ===
- World altitude record for women: 4,300 m (14,000 ft) (1922)
- Women's speed transcontinental record (1933)

=== Speed and altitude records – overall ===
- Speed records for 100 km (62 mi) flight (and with 230 kg (500 lb) cargo) (1931)
- Altitude record for autogyros: 5,613 m (18,415 ft) (1931)
- Speed record for east-to-west flight from Oakland, California, to Honolulu, Hawaii (1937)

=== Honors and formal recognition ===
- First woman to receive the Distinguished Flying Cross (1932)

== Books by Earhart ==
Earhart was a successful and heavily promoted writer who served as aviation editor for Cosmopolitan from 1928 to 1930. She wrote magazine articles, newspaper columns, and essays, and published two books based upon her experiences as a flyer during her lifetime:

- 20 Hrs. 40 Min. (1928) is a journal of her experiences as the first woman passenger on a transatlantic flight.
- The Fun of It (1932) is a memoir of her flying experiences and an essay on women in aviation.
- Last Flight (1937) features the periodic journal entries she sent to the United States during her round-the-world flight attempt, and was published in newspapers in the weeks prior to her departure from New Guinea. The journal was compiled by Earhart's husband GP Putnam after her disappearance over the Pacific. Many historians consider this book to be only partially Earhart's original work.

== First woman to cross the Atlantic Ocean in 1928 ==
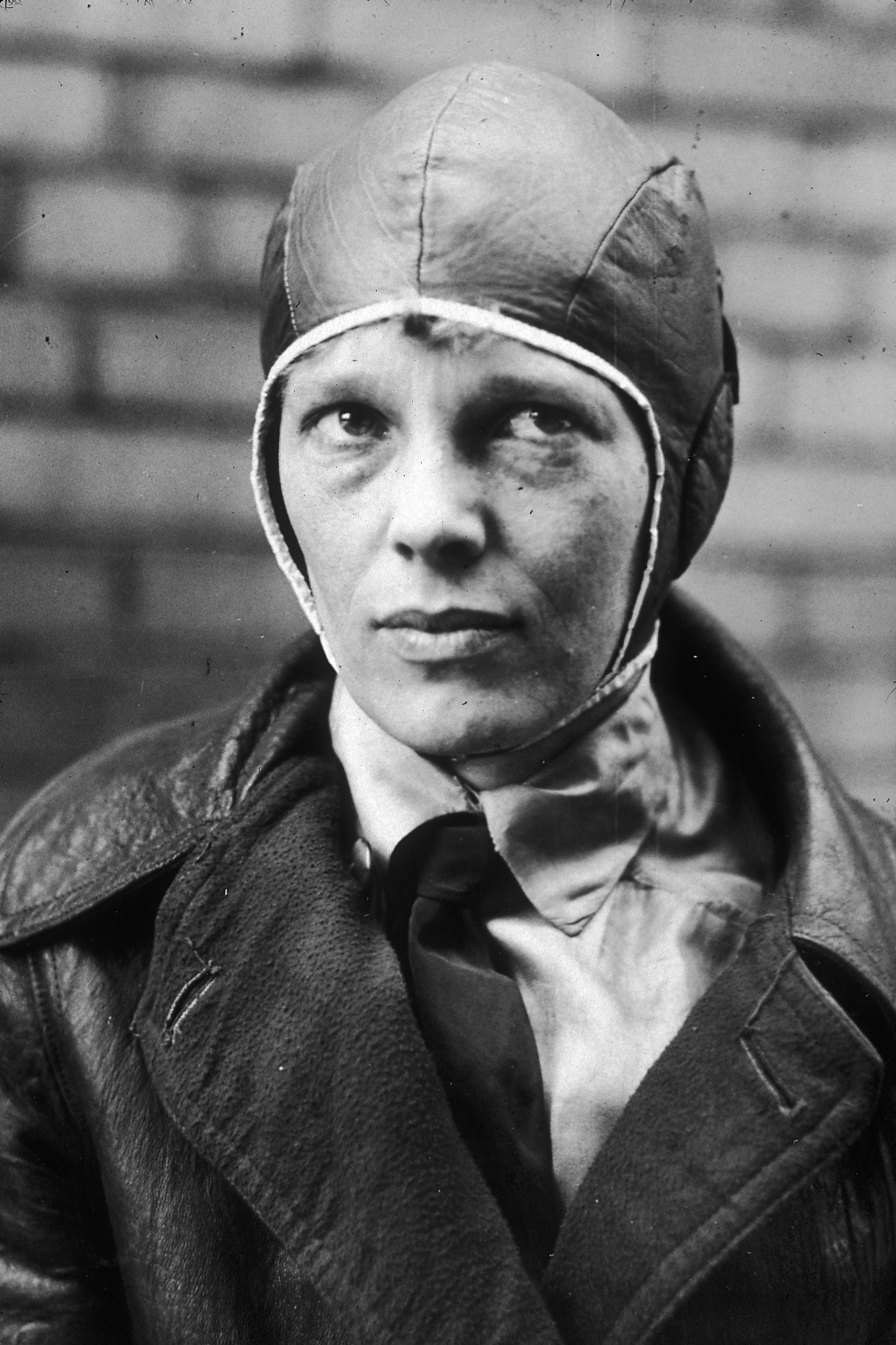
Earhart prior to her transatlantic crossing of June 17, 1928

=== Planning and sponsorship ===
In early 1928, inspired by Charles Lindbergh's successful solo transatlantic flight in 1927, American heiress Amy Phipps Guest – daughter of philanthropist (and Andrew Carnegie's business partner) Henry Phipps Jr. – announced her intention to become the first woman to cross the Atlantic by air. At the time, she was living in London with her husband, former British air minister Frederick Guest. Using her wealth and social connections, Guest assembled a team of aviation professionals to support her endeavor. She hired pilot Wilmer Stultz from Williamsburg, Pennsylvania, to lead the flight. In March 1928, Stultz had made headlines for completing the first non-stop flight from New York to Havana, accompanied by Oliver LeBoutillier and passenger Mabel Boll, aboard the aircraft Columbia. The previous year, Stultz had also piloted transatlantic attempts for aviator Frances Wilson Grayson.

Guest also recruited mechanic and co-pilot Louis Gordon from Collin County, Texas. For the aircraft, she acquired a Fokker F.VIIb Tri-Motor from famed explorer Commander Richard E. Byrd. Byrd had initially planned to use the plane for an Antarctic expedition, but when his backer, Edsel Ford—son of Henry Ford—suggested using a Ford Tri-Motor instead, Byrd agreed and sold the Fokker. Byrd would later serve as a technical advisor for the transatlantic flight. Guest named the plane Friendship to honor the special relationship between the United States and her new home, Great Britain. However, upon learning of her plans, Guest's family reacted with alarm. Her sons, Winston and Raymond, even threatened to quit Yale and Cambridge respectively. Under family pressure, Guest reluctantly gave up her dream of making the flight herself. Nevertheless, she remained determined to see a woman achieve the milestone. Instead of flying, she resolved to sponsor the project—and began searching for what she called "the right sort of girl". The candidate would need to be a pilot, well-educated, well-mannered, physically attractive, and American.

=== Selection of Amelia Earhart ===
In April 1928, George Palmer Putnam—the publicist and publisher of Charles Lindbergh's best-selling autobiography "WE"—caught wind of the planned transatlantic attempt. Curious, he met with his friend Captain Hilton Railey and shared that he had heard Richard Byrd had sold his plane to a mysterious buyer, and that floats were being fitted to the Fokker at East Boston Airport. Determined to get involved, Putnam encouraged Railey to "crash the gate" and investigate. Railey found Wilmer Stultz in a bar and, catching him in a talkative mood, learned of Amy Guest and the true purpose of the newly outfitted seaplane Friendship. Putnam and Railey resolved to take on the task of finding the "right sort of girl" on Amy Guest's behalf. Railey reached out to his friend, Rear Admiral Reginald R. Belknap, in Boston. After hearing the criteria outlined by Guest, Belknap immediately replied, "Call Denison House and ask for Amelia Earhart".

Upon receiving Railey's call, Earhart was initially skeptical, but agreed to meet him at his office. The moment she arrived, Railey was convinced he had found the right woman. Almost immediately, he asked her, "How would you like to be the first woman to cross the Atlantic?" Earhart wrote later "Under the circumstances... I couldn't say no." However, Earhart had conditions before accepting the invitation. She made it clear that the role of a mere passenger held no appeal to her—she wanted the opportunity to take her turn at the controls. Although she lacked experience with multi-engine aircraft and non-visual instrument flying, it was agreed that, weather permitting, she would be allowed to pilot the aircraft for a portion of the journey. It was written into her flight contract that Earhart would hold the title of commander aboard Friendship. She was granted final authority over all matters of policy, procedure, personnel, and any other issues that might arise during the mission—at least until their arrival in London. Both Wilmer Stultz and Louis Gordon would serve as her subordinates during the flight.

=== Preparations and departure ===
On June 3, 1928, after three unsuccessful attempts to take off from the Jeffries Yacht Club in East Boston, the crew of Friendship made critical adjustments to reduce weight. Six five-gallon cans of fuel were unloaded, and backup pilot Lou Gower voluntarily stepped down from the crew to further lighten the aircraft. The fourth attempt proved successful. After 67 tense seconds, Friendship lifted off the water and climbed steadily, heading north on the first leg of its transatlantic journey to Trepassey, Newfoundland. Friendship finally arrived in Trepassey on June 5, after poor weather forced Wilmer Stultz to make an unexpected landing in Halifax, Nova Scotia, the day before. Earhart later described the arrival at Trepassey as chaotic, likening it to a rodeo, with "maritime cowboys" in small boats aggressively vying to tow the plane, nearly entangling it in ropes and knocking crew member Slim Gordon into the water.

==== Transatlantic flight ====
Stranded by relentless gales, dense fog, and mechanical setbacks, the crew of Friendship endured nearly a fortnight of frustrating delays. Their departure was repeatedly thwarted by unpredictable tides, stormy seas, and sputtering engines, turning what should have been a quick refuel stop into a test of endurance. When dawn broke clear and brisk over Newfoundland on June 17, and weather reports suggested marginally favorable conditions over the Atlantic, Earhart insisted they seize the opportunity to take off—despite objections from pilot Wilmer Stultz, who was nursing a severe hangover. After nearly two weeks of delays, Friendship finally took to the skies.

Meanwhile, at Harbour Grace, Newfoundland, the crew of the rival aircraft Columbia remained grounded. Captain Oliver LeBoutillier had reunited with socialite Mabel Boll, determined to make her own mark with a transatlantic crossing. However, LeBoutillier refused to risk flying in the still-uncertain weather and chose to wait for clearer skies. Frustrated and left behind, Boll could only listen for updates as Friendship soared eastward toward the United Kingdom. Furious and disheartened, she accused Earhart's team of receiving preferential treatment—claiming they had been provided with a more favorable weather report than the one given to Columbia. The accusation was firmly rejected by the local meteorologist, who maintained that both crews had received identical forecasts. Nevertheless, Friendship had gained the advantage—not by deception, but by daring.

From early in the flight, the crew encountered fog, cloud cover, and poor visibility, forcing pilot Wilmer Stultz to rely entirely on instrument flying. Earhart, although a licensed pilot, had no experience with non-visual, instrument-only flying, and was therefore unable to take the controls. Instead, she kept the flight log and helped with navigation checks, while mechanic Louis Gordon managed fuel and engine performance. Several hours into the flight, they spotted the SS America, an ocean liner under the command of Captain George Fried, roughly 75 miles south-east of Cobh, Ireland. Hoping to confirm their position, the crew of Friendship circled the vessel. Captain Fried, recognizing the significance of the aircraft, ordered the ship's name and location to be chalked on the deck to assist the crew. However, before the message could be prepared, Friendship had already vanished into the mist, continuing eastward. Critically, the aircraft's radio had failed early in the flight, leaving the crew unable to transmit or receive any messages. This failure meant they could not confirm their course, update anyone on their status, or receive weather updates. As a result, their arrival location would be a complete surprise to those on the ground.

=== Landing and reception ===
After nearly 21 hours in the air, with low fuel and limited visibility due to persistent mist, the crew of Friendship were in urgent need of a suitable landing site. While flying along the coast of South Wales (although they did not know their location at the time), they identified an estuary and a nearby industrial town with a harbour as a potential landing area. The aircraft landed in the Burry Estuary, between the town of Burry Port and the village of Pwll, in Carmarthenshire, Wales. Upon landing, co-pilot Louis "Slim" Gordon climbed onto the starboard pontoon and secured the aircraft to a large navigation buoy off the coast of Burry Port, using rope kept on board for emergencies or for use as a sea anchor. This improvised mooring was the only available option in the area.

Despite their arrival following a transatlantic flight, initial local response was minimal. A few nearby railway workers observed the aircraft but did not approach. Eventually, Norman Fisher, a manager at the Frickers Metal Company in Burry Port, rowed out to the plane. Wilmer Stultz went ashore with him to make contact with their sponsors, who were waiting in Southampton. The original intention had been to refuel in the estuary and continue the journey to Southampton, where the crew's sponsors—including Captain Hilton Railey and Amy Phipps Guest—were assembled. Earhart and Gordon remained on board the aircraft, as the crew did not consider the flight officially complete at that point.

Several small boats approached the aircraft during this time, but Earhart declined to go ashore, intending to do so only if the flight continued as planned. Later that day, Captain Railey arrived in Burry Port by seaplane, accompanied by Allen Raymond, a reporter for The New York Times. Following discussions regarding the aircraft's fuel status, the challenging tidal conditions, and ongoing poor visibility, the decision was made to take Friendship to Burry Port Harbour. It would be there, in the small Welsh harbour town, that Earhart's transatlantic journey officially concluded—securing her place in history as the first woman to cross the Atlantic by air. Friendship moved under its own power from the navigation buoy to Burry Port Harbour, where the crew were then rowed ashore. A large and excitable crowd had gathered and local police escorted the aviators to the Frickers Metal Company office for safety, where the police awaited reinforcements while the crew were served refreshments.

As the world's press descended on Burry Port, Earhart attracted the majority of public and media attention, though she consistently emphasized that the primary credit belonged to the pilots. When interviewed after coming ashore, she remarked: "Bill (Wilmer Stultz) did all the flying—had to. I was just baggage, like a sack of potatoes ... maybe someday I'll try it alone." Later that evening, the crew travelled by car to the Ashburnham Hotel in nearby Pembrey, where they were able to rest and recover after their historic journey.

=== Aftermath ===
Friendship departed Burry Port Harbour at approximately 11 a.m. on 19 June 1928, beginning the final leg of its journey to Southampton, but not without a final moment of drama. Among the spectators that morning was Sir Arthur Whitten Brown, who—alongside John Alcock—had completed the first non-stop transatlantic flight in 1919. Living in nearby Swansea, Whitten Brown had travelled to Burry Port with his family to congratulate Earhart and present her with a bouquet of flowers. A boat was dispatched to carry him out to the Friendship, but unaware of his approach, the crew had already begun their departure. As a result, a potentially historic meeting between the first man and the first woman to cross the Atlantic nonstop by air was narrowly missed.

At Southampton, the Friendship crew were once again met by enthusiastic crowds. Among those welcoming them was Amy Phipps Guest—the flight's principal sponsor and owner of Friendship. It was the first time Guest and Earhart met in person. She had changed aircraft and flew an Avro 594 Avian III, that was owned by Irish aviator Lady Mary Heath, the first woman to hold a commercial flying licence in Britain. Earhart later acquired the aircraft and had it shipped to the United States.

=== American reception ===
Upon returning to the United States, Earhart and the crew of Friendship were met with widespread acclaim. On July 6, 1928, they were honoured with a ticker-tape parade along the Canyon of Heroes in New York City, a traditional celebration reserved for national heroes. Thousands lined Broadway to celebrate the first successful transatlantic flight by a woman.

Shortly after, the crew was received at the White House by President Calvin Coolidge, who formally recognized their achievement. Earhart became the focus of particular public and media attention. Despite her limited role as a passenger during the flight, her status as the first woman to cross the Atlantic by air captured the imagination of the American public.

Earhart, Stultz, and Gordon were given receptions at Boston and Chicago, where they were welcomed by civic leaders and large crowds. Earhart received numerous awards and honors during this period. Her modesty and charisma further endeared her to the American public, and her fame quickly surpassed that of her fellow crew members.

The flight marked the beginning of Earhart's rise to international prominence. With the help of publisher and publicist George Palmer Putnam, she began a successful lecture tour and endorsed various products. Despite her own insistence that the credit belonged to the pilots, Earhart's visibility in the media helped redefine public perceptions of women in aviation and paved the way for her subsequent solo transatlantic flight in 1932.

Earhart later authored a book about the flight, 20 Hrs. 40 Min.: Our Flight in the Friendship, with the title referencing the duration of the transatlantic journey. However, according to the flight log that Earhart herself maintained, the actual flight time was 20 hours and 49 minutes.

=== Celebrity status ===
When Earhart became famous, the press dubbed her "Lady Lindy", because of her physical resemblance and the career-parallels to fellow aviator Charles Lindbergh, and "Queen of the Air". Immediately after her return to the United States, Earhart undertook an exhausting lecture tour in 1928 and 1929. Putnam had undertaken to heavily promote Earhart in a campaign that included publishing a book she wrote, a series of new lecture tours, and using pictures of her in media endorsements for products including luggage. Wanting to contribute to support Richard Evelyn Byrd's imminent expedition to the South Pole, Earhart accepted a Lucky Strike cigarettes endorsement deal with the money redirected to Byrd. After the Lucky Strike ads, McCall's magazine retracted their offer for Earhart to become their aviation editor.

The marketing campaign by both Earhart and Putnam was successful in establishing the Earhart mystique in the public psyche. Rather than simply endorsing the products, Earhart became involved in the promotions, especially in women's fashions. The "active living" lines that were sold in stores such as Macy's were an expression of Earhart's new image. Her concept of simple, natural lines matched with wrinkle-proof, washable materials was the embodiment of a sleek, purposeful, but feminine "A.E.", the familiar name she used with family and friends. Celebrity endorsements helped Earhart finance her flying.

== Various roles and accomplishments ==
=== Promoting aviation ===
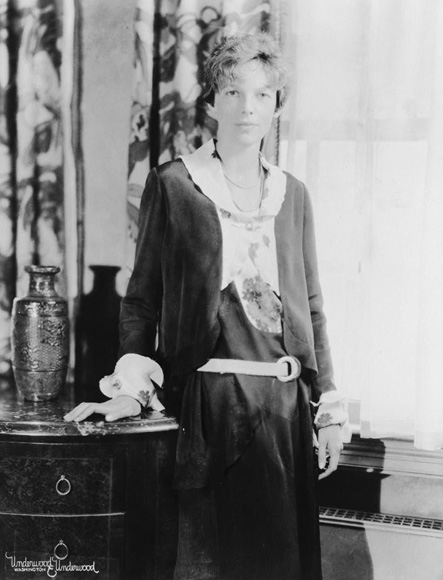
Studio portrait of Earhart, c. 1932. Putnam instructed her to disguise a "gap-toothed" smile by keeping her mouth closed in formal photographs.

Earhart accepted a position as associate editor at Cosmopolitan and used it to campaign for greater public acceptance of aviation, especially focusing on the role of women entering the field. In 1929, Transcontinental Air Transport (TAT) appointed Earhart and Margaret Bartlett Thornton to promote air travel, particularly for women, and Earhart helped set up the Ludington Airline, the first regional shuttle service between New York and Washington, D.C. Earhart was appointed Vice President of National Airways, which operated Boston-Maine Airways and several other airlines in the northeastern US, and by 1940 had become Northeast Airlines. In 1934, Earhart interceded on behalf of Isabel Ebel (who had helped Earhart in 1932) to be accepted as the first woman student of aeronautical engineering at New York University (NYU).

=== Competitive flying ===
In August 1928, Earhart became the first woman to fly solo across the North American continent and back. Her piloting skills and professionalism gradually grew, and she was acknowledged by experienced professional pilots who flew with her. General Leigh Wade, who flew with Earhart in 1929, said: "She was a born flier, with a delicate touch on the stick."

Earhart made her first attempt at competitive air racing in 1929 during the first Santa Monica-to-Cleveland Women's Air Derby (nicknamed the "Powder Puff Derby" by Will Rogers), which left Santa Monica, California, on August 18 and arrived in Cleveland, Ohio, on August 26. During the race, Earhart settled into fourth place in the "heavy planes" division. At the second-to-last stop at Columbus, Earhart's friend Ruth Nichols, who was in third place, had an accident; her aircraft hit a tractor and flipped over, forcing her out of the race. At Cleveland, Earhart was placed third in the heavy division.

In 1930, Earhart became an official of the National Aeronautic Association, and in this role, she promoted the establishment of separate women's records and was instrumental in persuading the Fédération Aéronautique Internationale (FAI) to accept a similar international standard. On April 8, 1931, Earhart set a world altitude record of 18,415 feet (5,613 m) flying a Pitcairn PCA-2 autogyro she borrowed from the Beech-Nut Chewing Gum company.

During this period, Earhart became involved with Ninety-Nines, an organization of female pilots providing moral support and advancing the cause of women in aviation. In 1929, following the Women's Air Derby, Earhart called a meeting of female pilots. She suggested the name based on the number of the charter members, and became the organization's first president in 1930. Earhart was a vigorous advocate for female pilots; when the 1934 Bendix Trophy Race banned women from competing, Earhart refused to fly screen actor Mary Pickford to Cleveland to open the race.

=== Marriage to George Putnam ===
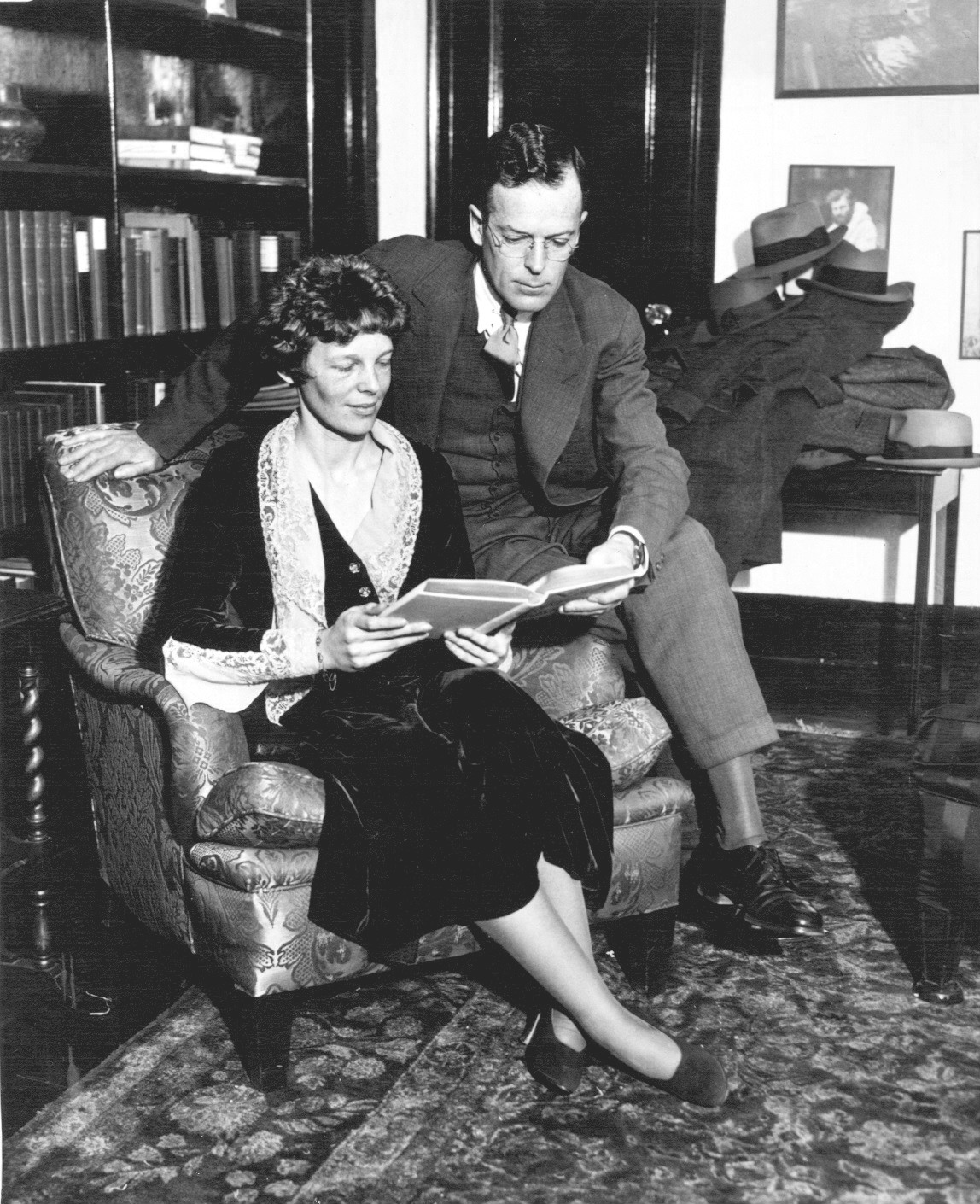
Earhart and Putnam in 1931

Earhart married her public relations manager George P. Putnam on February 7, 1931, in Putnam's mother's house in Noank, Connecticut, in what has been described as a marriage of convenience. Earhart gained a tireless promoter and Putnam—heir to a publishing company—gained an opportunity for cultural dominance.

Earhart had been engaged to Samuel Chapman, a chemical engineer from Boston, but she broke off the engagement on November 23, 1928. She reportedly spent the summer of 1928 writing her first book at the home of Putnam and his first wife while having an affair with Putnam. Putnam, known as GP, was divorced in 1929 and sought out Earhart, proposing to her six times before she agreed to marry him. Earhart referred to her marriage as a "partnership" with "dual control"; in a letter to Putnam, and hand-delivered on the day of the wedding, she wrote:

I want you to understand I shall not hold you to any midaevil [sic] code of faithfulness to me nor shall I consider myself bound to you similarly ... I may have to keep some place where I can go to be by myself, now and then, for I cannot guarantee to endure at all times the confinement of even an attractive cage.

Earhart's ideas on marriage were liberal for the time; she believed in equal responsibilities for both partners and kept her own name rather than being referred to as "Mrs. Putnam". When The New York Times referred to her as "Mrs. Putnam", she laughed it off. Putnam also learned he would be called "Mr. Earhart". There was no honeymoon because Earhart was involved in a nine-day, cross-country tour promoting autogyros and the tour's sponsor, Beech-Nut chewing gum. Earhart and Putnam never had children, but Putnam had two sons—the explorer and writer David Binney Putnam (1913–1992), and George Palmer Putnam Jr. (1921–2013)—from his previous marriage to Dorothy Binney (1888–1982), an heir to her father's chemical company Binney & Smith.

=== Move from New York to California ===
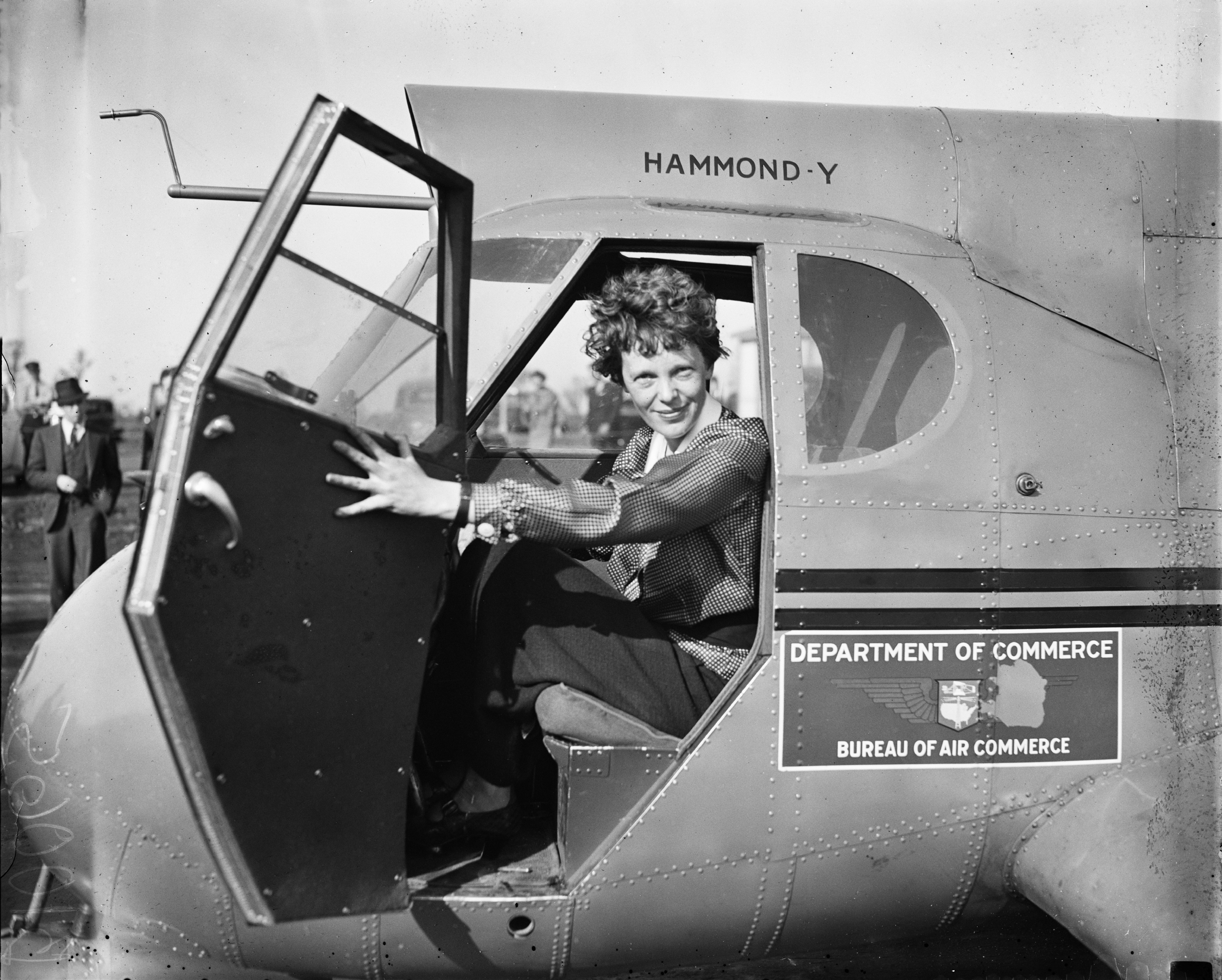
Earhart In a Stearman-Hammond Y-1

In late November 1934, while Earhart was away on a speaking tour, a fire broke out at the Putnam residence in Rye, destroying many family treasures and Earhart's personal mementos. Putnam had already sold his interest in the New York-based publishing company to his cousin Palmer Putnam. Following the fire, the couple decided to move to the west coast, where Putnam took up his new position as head of the editorial board of Paramount Pictures in North Hollywood.

At Earhart's urging, in June 1935, Putnam purchased a small house in Toluca Lake, a San Fernando Valley celebrity enclave community between the Warner Brothers and Universal Pictures studio complexes, where they had earlier rented a temporary residence.

In September 1935, Earhart and Paul Mantz established a business partnership they had been considering since late 1934, and established the short-lived Earhart-Mantz Flying School, which Mantz controlled and operated through his aviation company United Air Services, which was based at Burbank Airport. Putnam handled publicity for the school, which primarily taught instrument flying using Link Trainers. Also in 1935, Earhart joined Purdue University as a visiting faculty member to counsel women on careers and as a technical advisor to its Department of Aeronautics. Earhart lived in Women's Residence Hall South, now Duhme Hall, part of Windsor Halls on Purdue University's campus.

== First solo female transatlantic flight in 1932 ==
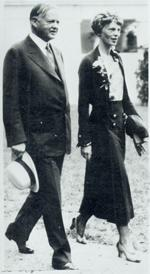
Earhart walking with President Herbert Hoover in the grounds of the White House on January 2, 1932

On May 20, 1932, 34-year-old Earhart set off from Harbour Grace, Newfoundland, with a copy of the Telegraph-Journal, given to her by journalist Stuart Trueman to confirm the date of the flight. She intended to fly to Paris in her single engine Lockheed Vega 5B to emulate Charles Lindbergh's solo flight five years earlier. (Note: Earhart's Vega 5B was her third, after trading in two Vega 1s at the Lockheed Aircraft Company's Burbank plant.) Her technical advisor for the flight was the Norwegian-American aviator Bernt Balchen, who helped prepare her aircraft and played the role of "decoy" for the press because he was ostensibly preparing Earhart's Vega for his own Arctic flight. (Note: Bernt Balchen had been instrumental in other transatlantic and Arctic record-breaking flights during that period.) After a flight lasting 14 hours, 56 minutes, during which she contended with strong northerly winds, icy conditions and mechanical problems, Earhart landed in a pasture near Culmore, north of Derry, Northern Ireland. The landing was witnessed by Cecil King and T. Sawyer. When a farm hand asked, "Have you flown far?" Earhart replied, "From America."

As the first woman to fly solo nonstop across the Atlantic, Earhart received the Distinguished Flying Cross from Congress, the Cross of Knight of the Legion of Honor from the French government, and the Gold Medal of the National Geographic Society from President Herbert Hoover. As her fame grew, Earhart developed friendships with many people in high office, most notably First Lady Eleanor Roosevelt, who shared many of Earhart's interests, especially women's causes. After flying with Earhart, Roosevelt obtained a student permit but did not further pursue her plans to learn to fly. Earhart and Roosevelt frequently communicated with each other. Another flyer, Jacqueline Cochran, who was said to be Earhart's rival, also became her confidante during this period.

=== Additional solo flights ===
Newsreel of Earhart flying from Honolulu, Hawaii, to Oakland, California, in 1935

On January 11, 1935, Earhart became the first aviator to fly solo from Honolulu, Hawaii, to Oakland, California. This time, Earhart used a Lockheed 5C Vega. Although many aviators had attempted this flight, including the participants in the 1927 Dole Air Race, which flew the opposite direction, and resulted in three deaths, Earhart's flight was mainly routine with no mechanical breakdowns. In her final hours, she relaxed and listened to "the broadcast of the Metropolitan Opera from New York".

On April 19, 1935, using her Lockheed Vega aircraft that she had named "old Bessie, the fire horse", (Note: "Old Bessie" started out as a Vega 5 built in 1928 as c/n 36, but was modified with a replacement fuselage to become a 5B.) Earhart flew solo from Los Angeles to Mexico City. Earhart's next record attempt was a nonstop flight from Mexico City to New York. After she set off on May 8, her flight was uneventful, although large crowds that greeted her in Newark, New Jersey, were a concern, because she had to be careful not to taxi into them.

Earhart again participated in the 1935 Bendix Trophy long-distance air race, finishing fifth, the best result she could manage because her stock Lockheed Vega, whose maximum speed was 195 mph (314 km/h), was outclassed by purpose-built aircraft that reached more than 300 mph (480 km/h). The race had been difficult because a competitor, Cecil Allen, died in a fire at takeoff, and Jacqueline Cochran was forced to pull out due to mechanical problems. In addition, "blinding fog" and violent thunderstorms plagued the race.

Between 1930 and 1935, Earhart set seven women's speed-and-distance aviation records in a variety of aircraft, including the Kinner Airster, Lockheed Vega, and Pitcairn Autogiro. By 1935, recognizing the limitations of her "lovely red Vega" in long, transoceanic flights, Earhart contemplated a new "prize ... one flight which I most wanted to attempt—a circumnavigation of the globe as near its waistline as could be." For the new venture, she would need a new aircraft.

== First attempt at world flight ==
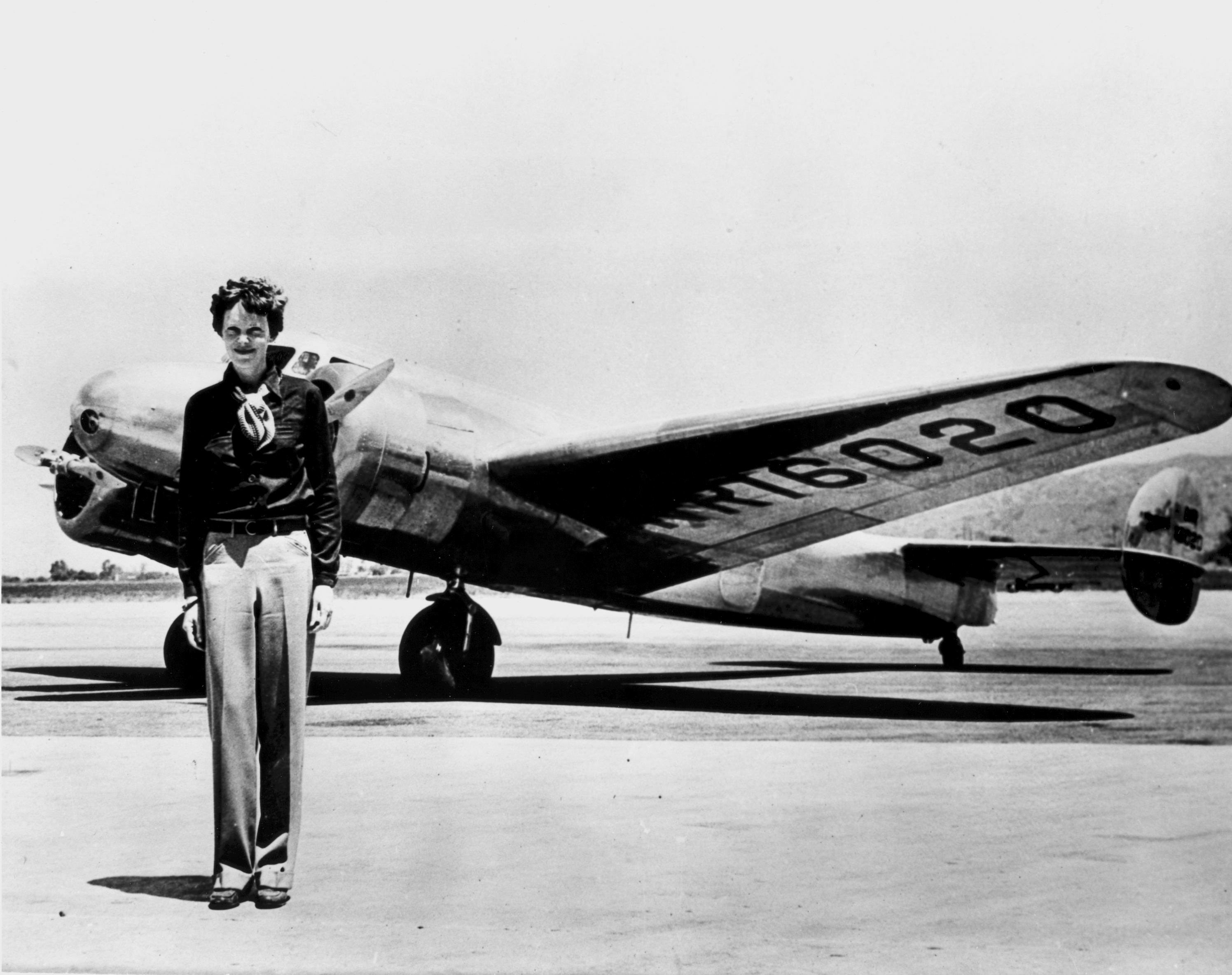
Earhart standing in front of the Lockheed Electra in which she disappeared in July 1937

=== Planning ===
Early in 1936, Earhart started planning to fly around the world; if she succeeded, she would become the first woman to do so. Although others had flown around the world, Earhart's flight would be the longest at 29,000 miles (47,000 km) because it followed a roughly equatorial route. Earhart planned to court publicity along the route to increase interest in a planned book about the expedition.

Purdue University established the Amelia Earhart Fund for Aeronautical Research and gave $50,000 (equivalent to $1,160,000 in 2025) to fund the purchase of a Lockheed Electra 10E airplane. In July 1936, Lockheed Aircraft Company built the airplane, which was fitted with extra fuel tanks and other extensive modifications. Earhart dubbed the twin-engine monoplane her "flying laboratory". The plane was built at Lockheed's plant in Burbank, California, and after delivery, it was hangared at the nearby Mantz's United Air Services.

Earhart chose Harry Manning as her navigator; he had been the captain of the President Roosevelt, the ship that had transported Earhart from Europe in 1928. Manning was also a pilot and a skilled radio operator who knew Morse code.

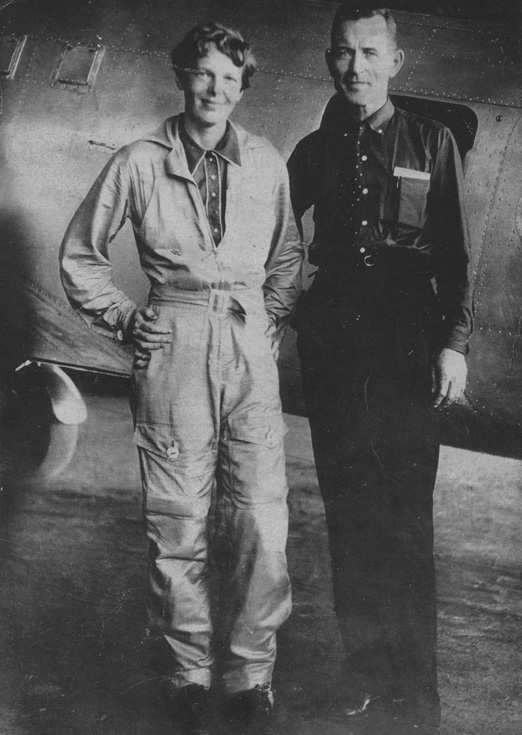
Earhart and her navigator Fred Noonan

The original plan was a two-person crew: Earhart would fly and Manning would navigate. During a flight across the US that included Earhart, Manning, and Putnam, Earhart flew using landmarks; she and Putnam knew where they were. Manning did a navigation fix that alarmed Putnam, because Manning made a minor navigational error that put them in the wrong state; they were flying close to the state line, but Putnam was still concerned. Sometime later, Putnam and Mantz arranged a night flight to test Manning's navigational skill. Under poor navigational conditions, Manning's position was off by 20 miles (32 km). Elgen M. and Marie K. Long considered Manning's performance reasonable, because it was within an acceptable error of 30 miles (48 km), but Mantz and Putnam wanted a better navigator.

Through contacts in the Los Angeles aviation community, Fred Noonan was chosen as a second navigator, because there were significant additional factors that had to be dealt with while using celestial navigation for aircraft. Noonan, a licensed ship's captain, was experienced in both marine and flight navigation; he had recently left Pan American World Airways (Pan Am), where he established most of the company's China Clipper seaplane routes across the Pacific. Noonan had also been responsible for training Pan American's navigators to fly the route between San Francisco and Manila. Under the original plans, Noonan would navigate from Hawaii to Howland Island—a difficult portion of the flight—then Manning would continue with Earhart to Australia, and she would proceed on her own for the remainder of the project.

=== Abandoned first attempt ===
On March 17, 1937, Earhart and her crew set out on the first leg of her round-the-world flight, but they abandoned this attempt after a non-fatal crash that damaged the aircraft. The first leg of this attempt was between Oakland, California, and Honolulu, Hawaii. The crew were Earhart, Noonan, Manning, and Mantz, who was acting as Earhart's technical advisor. The propeller hubs' variable pitch mechanisms had problems, so the aircraft was taken to the U.S. Navy's Luke Field facility at Pearl Harbor for servicing. The flight resumed three days later from Luke Field, with Earhart, Noonan and Manning on board. The next destination was Howland Island, a small island in the Pacific. Manning, the radio operator, had made arrangements to use radio direction finding to home in to the island. The flight never left Luke Field; during the takeoff run, there was an uncontrolled ground-loop, the forward landing gear collapsed, both propellers hit the ground, and the plane skidded on its belly. The cause of the crash is not known; some witnesses at Luke Field, including an Associated Press journalist, said they saw a tire blow. Earhart earlier thought the Electra's right tire had blown and the right landing gear had collapsed. Some sources, including Mantz, cited an error by Earhart. With the aircraft severely damaged, the attempt was abandoned and the aircraft was shipped to Lockheed in Burbank, California, for repairs.

== World flight 1937 ==
The planned flight route

While the Electra was being repaired, Earhart and Putnam secured additional funds and prepared for a second attempt, in which they would fly west to east. The second attempt began with an unpublicized flight from Oakland to Miami, Florida, and after arriving there, Earhart announced her plans to circumnavigate the globe. The flight's opposite direction was partly the result of changes in global wind-and-weather patterns along the planned route since the earlier attempt. Putnam pressed for the removal of important navigational, communication, and safety equipment to lighten the aircraft.

Manning, the only skilled radio operator, had left the crew, which now consisted of Noonan and Earhart. The pair departed Miami on June 1 and after numerous stops in South America, Africa, the Indian subcontinent, and Southeast Asia, arrived in Lae, New Guinea, on June 29, 1937. At this stage, about 22,000 miles (35,000 km) of the journey had been completed. The remaining 7,000 miles (11,000 km) would be over the Pacific.

Earhart's 1937 flight route
Date	Departure city	Arrival city	Nautical miles	Notes
May 20, 1937	Oakland, California	Burbank, California	283	
May 21, 1937	Burbank, California	Tucson, Arizona	393	
May 22, 1937	Tucson, Arizona	New Orleans, Louisiana	1070	Arrived at Lakefront Airport
May 23, 1937	New Orleans, Louisiana	Miami, Florida	586	Arrived at Miami Municipal Airport.
June 1, 1937	Miami, Florida	San Juan, Puerto Rico	908	
June 2, 1937	San Juan, Puerto Rico	Caripito, Venezuela	492	Out of Isla Grande Airport
June 3, 1937	Caripito, Venezuela	Paramaribo, Surinam	610	
June 4, 1937	Paramaribo, Surinam	Fortaleza, Brazil	1142	
June 5, 1937	Fortaleza, Brazil	Natal, Brazil	235	
June 7, 1937	Natal, Brazil	Saint-Louis, French West Africa (now Senegal)	1727	Transatlantic flight
June 8, 1937	Saint-Louis, Fr.W. Africa	Dakar, Fr.W. Africa (now Senegal)	100	
June 10, 1937	Dakar, Fr.W. Africa	Gao, French Sudan	1016	
June 11, 1937	Gao, French Sudan	Fort-Lamy, French Equatorial Africa (now N'Djamena, Chad)	910	
June 12, 1937	Fort-Lamy, Fr.Eq. Africa	El Fasher, Anglo-Egyptian Sudan	610	
June 13, 1937	El Fasher, Anglo-Egyptian Sudan	Khartoum, Anglo-Egyptian Sudan	437	
June 13, 1937	Khartoum, Anglo-Egyptian Sudan	Massawa, Italian East Africa (now Eritrea)	400	
June 14, 1937	Massawa, Italian East Africa	Assab, Italian East Africa (now Eritrea)	241	
June 15, 1937	Assab, Italian East Africa	Karachi, British India	1627	First ever non-stop flight from the Red Sea to India
June 17, 1937	Karachi, British India	Calcutta, British India	1178	
June 18, 1937	Calcutta, British India	Akyab, Burma	291	
June 19, 1937	Akyab, Burma	Rangoon, Burma	268	
June 20, 1937	Rangoon, Burma	Bangkok, Siam	315	
June 20, 1937	Bangkok, Siam	Singapore, Straits Settlements	780	
June 21, 1937	Singapore, Straits Settlements	Bandoeng, Dutch East Indies (now Indonesia)	541	
June 25, 1937	Bandoeng, Dutch East Indies	Soerabaia, Dutch East Indies (now Indonesia)	310	Delayed due to monsoon
June 25, 1937	Soerabaia, Dutch East Indies	Bandoeng, Dutch East Indies	310	Returned for repairs, Earhart ill with dysentery
June 26, 1937	Bandoeng, Dutch East Indies	Soerabaia, Dutch East Indies	310	
June 27, 1937	Soerabaia, Dutch East Indies	Koepang, Dutch East Indies (now Indonesia)	668	
June 28, 1937	Koepang, Dutch East Indies	Darwin, Australia	445	Direction finder repaired, parachutes removed and sent home
June 29, 1937	Darwin, Australia	Lae, New Guinea (now Papua New Guinea)	1012	
July 2, 1937	Lae, New Guinea	Howland Island, American Equatorial Islands	2223	Did not arrive
July 3, 1937	Howland Island	Honolulu, Hawaii	1900	Planned leg
July 4, 1937	Honolulu, Hawaii	Oakland, California	2400	Planned leg

=== Flight between Lae and Howland Island ===
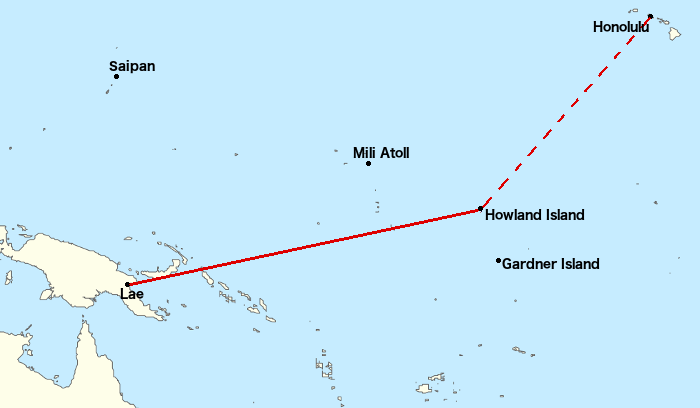
Earhart's flight was intended to be from Lae Airfield to Howland Island, a trip of 2,556 miles (2,200 nmi; 4,100 km).

On July 2, 1937, at 10:00 am local time (12:00 am GMT), Earhart and Noonan took off from Lae Airfield in the heavily loaded Electra. Their destination was Howland Island, a flat sliver of land 6,500 ft (2,000 m) long and 1,600 ft (500 m) wide, 10 ft (3 m) high and 2,556 miles (2,221 nmi; 4,113 km) away. The expected flying time was about 20 hours; accounting for the two-hour time-zone difference between Lae and Howland, and the crossing of the International Date Line, the aircraft was expected to arrive at Howland the morning of the next day, 2 July. The aircraft departed Lae with about 1,100 U.S. gallons (4,200 liters) of gasoline.

In preparation for the trip to Howland Island, the U.S. Coast Guard had sent the cutter USCGC Itasca (1929) to the island to offer communication and navigation support for the flight. The cutter was to communicate with Earhart's aircraft via radio, transmit a homing signal to help the aviators locate Howland Island, use radio direction-finding (RDF), and use the cutter's boilers to create a dark column of smoke that could be seen over the horizon. All of the navigation methods failed to guide Earhart to Howland Island.

Around 3 pm Lae time, Earhart reported her altitude as 10,000 ft (3,000 m), but that they would reduce altitude due to thick clouds. Around 5 pm, Earhart reported her altitude as 7,000 ft (2,100 m) and speed as 150 kn (280 km/h; 170 mph). During Earhart's and Noonan's approach to Howland Island, Itasca received strong, clear voice transmissions from Earhart identifying as KHAQQ, but she was unable to hear voice transmissions from the ship.

The first calls received from Earhart were routine reports stating the weather was cloudy and overcast at 2:45 am and just before 5 am on July 2. These calls were broken up by static, but at this point, the aircraft was a long distance from Howland. At 6:14 am, another call was received stating that the aircraft was within 200 miles (320 km) and requesting that the ship use its direction finder to provide a bearing for the aircraft. Earhart began whistling into the microphone to provide a continuous signal for the ship's crew to use. At this point, the radio operators on Itasca realized their RDF system could not tune into the aircraft's signal on 3105 kHz; radioman Leo Bellarts later commented he "was sitting there sweating blood because I couldn't do a darn thing about it". A similar call asking for a bearing was received at 6:45 am, when Earhart estimated they were 100 miles (160 km) away.

An Itasca radio log at 7:30–7:40 am states the aircraft had only a half hour of fuel remaining. A further radio log states they thought they were near Itasca but could not locate it and were flying at 1,000 ft (300 m). In her transmission at 7:58 am, Earhart said she could not hear Itasca and asked them to send voice signals so she could try to take a radio bearing. Itasca reported this signal as the loudest possible signal, indicating Earhart and Noonan were in the immediate area. The ship could not send voice at the frequency she asked for so they sent Morse code signals instead. Earhart acknowledged receiving these but said she was unable to determine their direction.

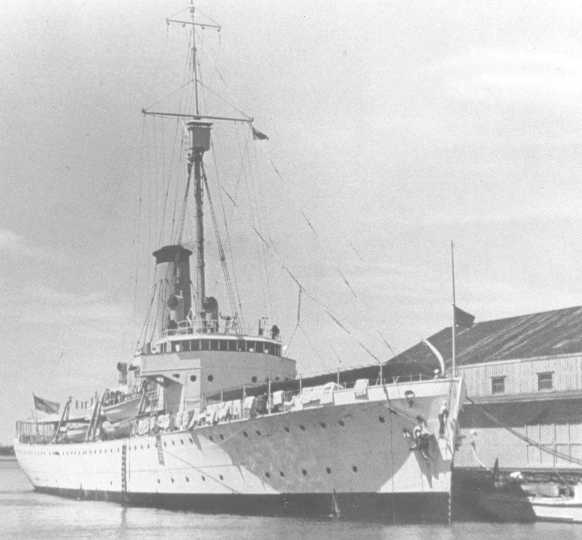
USCGC Itasca was at Howland Island to support the flight.

The last voice transmission received on Howland Island from Earhart indicated she and Noonan were flying along a line of position running north-to-south on 157–337 degrees, which Noonan would have calculated and drawn on a chart as passing through Howland. After all contact with Howland Island was lost, attempts to reach the flyers with voice and Morse code transmissions were made. Operators across the Pacific and in the United States may have heard signals from the Electra but these were weak or unintelligible.

A series of misunderstandings, errors or mechanical failures are likely to have occurred on the final approach to Howland Island. Noonan had earlier written about problems affecting the accuracy of RDF in navigation. Another cited cause of possible confusion was that Itasca and Earhart planned their communication schedule using time systems set a half-hour apart; Earhart was using Greenwich Civil Time (GCT) and Itasca was using an American Naval time-zone designation system.

Sources have noted Earhart's apparent lack of familiarity with her direction-finding system, which had been fitted to the aircraft just prior to the flight. The system was equipped with a new receiver from Bendix Corporation. Earhart's only training on the system was a brief introduction by Joe Gurr at the Lockheed factory. A card displaying the antenna's band settings was mounted so it was not visible. The Electra expected Itasca to transmit signals the Electra could use as an RDF beacon to find the ship. In theory, the plane could listen for the signal while rotating its loop antenna; a sharp minimum indicates the direction of the RDF beacon. The Electra's RDF equipment had failed due to a blown fuse during an earlier leg flying to Darwin; the fuse was replaced. Near Howland, Earhart could hear the transmission from Itasca on 7500 kHz, but she was unable to determine a minimum so she could not determine a direction to the ship. Earhart was also unable to determine a minimum during an RDF test at Lae.

=== Disappearance ===
Pathe newsreel detailing her 1937 disappearance

The U.S. government investigated the aircraft's disappearance and, in its report, concluded Earhart's plane ran out of fuel and crashed into the ocean. During the 1970s, retired United States Navy (USN) captain Laurance Safford began a lengthy analysis of the flight. His research included the intricate radio-transmission documentation. Safford concluded the flight had suffered from poor planning and worse execution.

Many researchers believe Earhart and Noonan died during or shortly after the crash. In 1982, retired USN rear admiral Richard R. Black, who was in administrative charge of the Howland Island airstrip and was present in the radio room on Itasca, said: "the Electra went into the sea about 10 am, July 2, 1937, not far from Howland." Earhart's stepson George Palmer Putnam Jr. has said he believes "the plane just ran out of gas". According to Earhart biographer Susan Butler, the aircraft went into the ocean out of sight of Howland Island and rests on the seafloor at a depth of 17,000 ft (5 km). Tom D. Crouch, senior curator of the National Air and Space Museum, has said the Electra is "18,000 ft. down" and compared its archaeological significance to that of RMS Titanic.

British aviation historian Roy Nesbit interpreted evidence in contemporary accounts and Putnam's correspondence and concluded Earhart's Electra was not fully fueled at Lae. William L. Polhemous, the navigator on Ann Pellegreno's 1967 flight that followed Earhart and Noonan's original flight path, studied navigational tables for July 2, 1937, and thought Noonan may have miscalculated the "single line approach" to Howland.

=== Search efforts ===
Beginning approximately one hour after Earhart's last recorded message, Itasca undertook an unsuccessful search north and west of Howland Island based on initial assumptions about transmissions from the aircraft and Earhart's account of weather conditions. The U.S. Navy joined the search and over about three days sent available resources to the search area near Howland Island. Official search efforts lasted until July 19, 1937. At $4 million (equivalent to $90 million in 2025), the air-and-sea search by the U.S. Navy and Coast Guard was the costliest and most intensive in U.S. history up to that time. Despite the unprecedented search, no physical evidence of Earhart, Noonan, or the Electra 10E was found.

On the mornings of July 3 and July 6, 1937, an Oakland radio amateur was reported to have heard emergency transmissions, seemingly from Earhart. (Note: The reputed July 3 transmission was an SOS message in Earhart's voice, accompanied by her plane's call letters. The alleged July 6 message, heard on one of Earhart's bands, was in a faint voice and its gender was unidentifiable. It said, "Cannot hold out much longer". Putnam believed the messages to be authentic because they were within five minutes of the half hour, the expected interval of her SOS messages.) In the days after their last confirmed transmissions, further transmissions purporting to be from Earhart were reported, many of which were determined to be hoaxes. The captain of USS Colorado later said: "There was no doubt many stations were calling the Earhart plane on the plane's frequency, some by voice and others by signals. All of these added to the confusion and doubtfulness of the authenticity of the reports."

Immediately after the end of the official search, Putnam financed a private search by local authorities of nearby Pacific islands and waters. In late July 1937, Putnam chartered two small boats and, while he remained in the United States, directed a search of other islands. Putnam acted to become the trustee of Earhart's estate so he could pay for the searches and related bills. In probate court in Los Angeles, Putnam asked to have the "declared death in absentia" seven-year waiting period waived so he could manage Earhart's finances. As a result, Earhart was declared legally dead on January 5, 1939.

In 2003 and 2006, David Jourdan extensively searched a 1,200-square-mile (3,100 km^{2}) area north and west of Howland Island with deep-sea sonar devices. The searches cost $4.5 million but did not find any wreckage. The search locations were derived from the line of position (157–337) broadcast by Earhart on July 2, 1937. In 2019, Robert Ballard led an expedition around Nikumaroro Island to locate wreckage of Earhart's plane and did not find any evidence of it. In 2024, Tony Romeo funded and coordinated an expedition around Howland Island to find Earhart's plane and did not find any evidence of it.

== World reaction ==
The disappearance of Earhart made headlines around the world. It is consistently cited as one of the great historical mysteries of all time.

In an interview with ABC News, one professor stated:"Earhart is different because of who she was. She might have been someone who would have been talked about in schools and books even if she hasn't gone missing. But even so, when Earhart comes up in conversations, it's usually about the fact that she disappeared."

== Speculation on disappearance ==
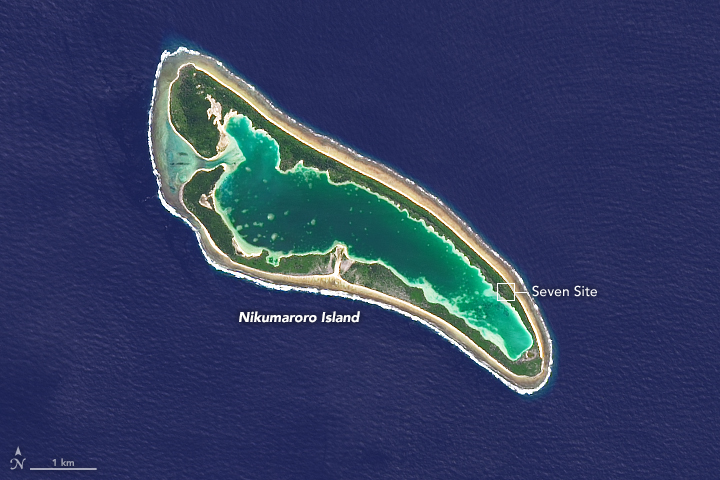
Nikumaroro (Gardner Island) in 2014. "Seven Site" is a focus of the search for Earhart's remains.

While most historians believe Earhart and Noonan crashed and sank in the Pacific Ocean, a number of other possibilities have been proposed, including several conspiracy theories. The Gardner Island hypothesis supposes Earhart and Noonan were unable to find Howland Island and continued south. Nikumaroro, one of the Phoenix Islands known at the time as Gardner Island, has been the subject of inquiry as a possible crash-landing site but, despite numerous expeditions, no definitive link between Earhart and the island has been found.

The Japanese capture theory proposes Japanese forces captured Earhart and Noonan, possibly after they navigated to the Imperial Japanese South Seas Mandate. A number of Earhart's relatives have been convinced the Japanese were somehow involved in her disappearance, citing unnamed witnesses including Japanese troops and Saipan natives.

The New Britain theory assumes Earhart turned back mid-flight and tried to reach the airfield at Rabaul, New Britain, northeast of mainland Papua New Guinea, approximately 2,200 miles (3,500 km) from Howland Island. In 1990, Donald Angwin, a veteran of the Australian Army's World War II New Britain campaign, reported that, in 1945, he had seen a wrecked aircraft in the jungle that may have been Earhart's Electra. Subsequent searches of the area failed to find any wreckage.

In November 2006, National Geographic Channel aired an episode of its series Undiscovered History that supposed Earhart survived the world flight, changed her name, remarried, and became Irene Craigmile Bolam. This claim had originally been published in the book Amelia Earhart Lives (1970), which is based on the research of Joseph Gervais. Shortly after the book's publication, Bolam filed a lawsuit requesting $1.5 million in damages (equivalent to $12 million in 2025) and the book's publisher McGraw-Hill withdrew it from the market; court records indicate the company reached an out-of-court settlement with her.

On September 26, 2025, President Donald Trump announced that he had ordered all government records concerning Earhart to be declassified and released.

=== Nikumaroro Island search October 2026 ===
In October 2026, an expedition organized by the Archaeological Legacy Institute (ALI) and Purdue University went to Nikumaroro Island, part of the nation of Kiribati. Their goal was an investigation of the island and the Taraia Object, an object seen underwater in photographs of the island, which some theorized might be Earhart's airplane, a Lockheed Model 10-E Electra. The expedition left the island a few days later, after the object turned out to be a clump of trees.

== Legacy ==
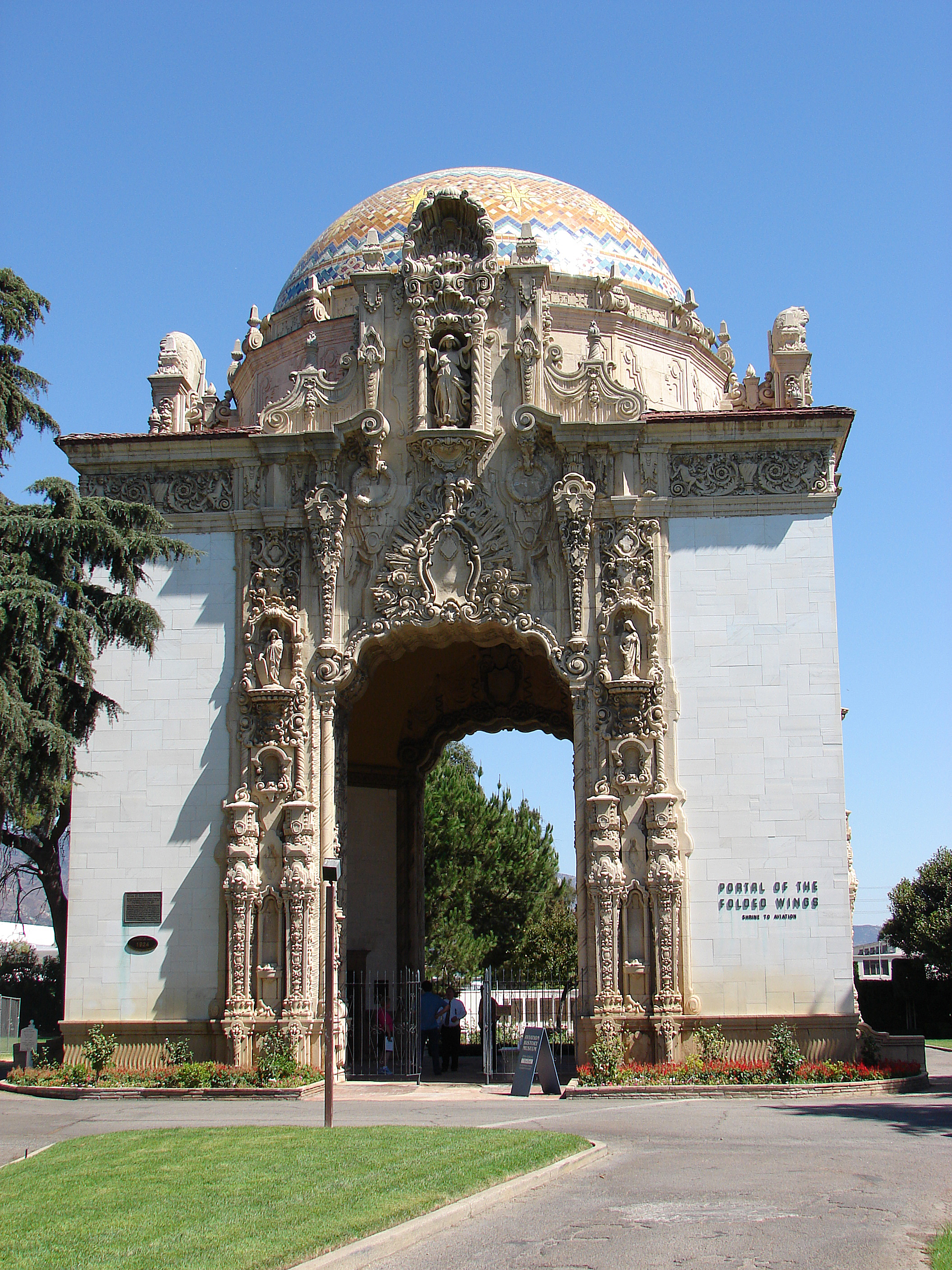
Earhart has a tribute at the Portal of the Folded Wings Shrine to Aviation.

During her life Earhart embraced celebrity culture and women's rights. After her disappearance she became a global cultural role model. Countless tributes and memorials have been made in her name, including a 2012 tribute by U.S. secretary of state Hillary Clinton, who said at a State Department event celebrating the ties of Earhart and the United States to its Pacific neighbors: "Earhart ... created a legacy that resonates today for anyone, girls and boys, who dreams of the stars". In 2013, Flying magazine ranked Earhart No. 9 on its list of the "51 Heroes of Aviation".

Earhart was an international celebrity during her lifetime. Her shyly charismatic appeal, independence, persistence, coolness under pressure, courage and goal-oriented career, together with the circumstances of her disappearance at a comparatively early age, gave her lasting fame in popular culture. Hundreds of articles and scores of books have been written about her life, which is often cited as a motivational tale, especially for girls. Earhart is generally regarded as a feminist role model. Earhart's accomplishments in aviation inspired a generation of female aviators, including more-than 1,000 female pilots of the Women Airforce Service Pilots (WASP), who served during World War II.

The home where Earhart was born is now the Amelia Earhart Birthplace Museum and is maintained by Ninety-Nines, an international group of female pilots of which Earhart was the first elected president. The Amelia Earhart Festival has taken place in Atchison, Kansas, every year since 1996.

=== Tributes and memorials ===
==== Tributary flights ====
In 1967, Ann Pellegreno flew a similar aircraft to Earhart's, a Lockheed 10A Electra, to complete a round-the-world flight that followed Earhart's flight plan. On the 30th anniversary of Earhart's disappearance, Pellegreno dropped a wreath over Howland Island in her honor. In 1997, on the 60th anniversary of Earhart's round-the-world flight, San Antonio businesswoman Linda Finch retraced the final flight path, flying a restored 1935 Lockheed Electra 10, the same make and model of aircraft as Earhart's. In 2001, another commemorative flight retraced the route Earhart flew in her August 1928 transcontinental record flight. Carlene Mendieta flew an original Avro Avian, the same type of aircraft that was used in 1928.

==== Buildings and structures ====
In 1942, a United States Liberty ship named SS Amelia Earhart was launched; it was wrecked in 1948. USNS Amelia Earhart was named in her honor in May 2007.

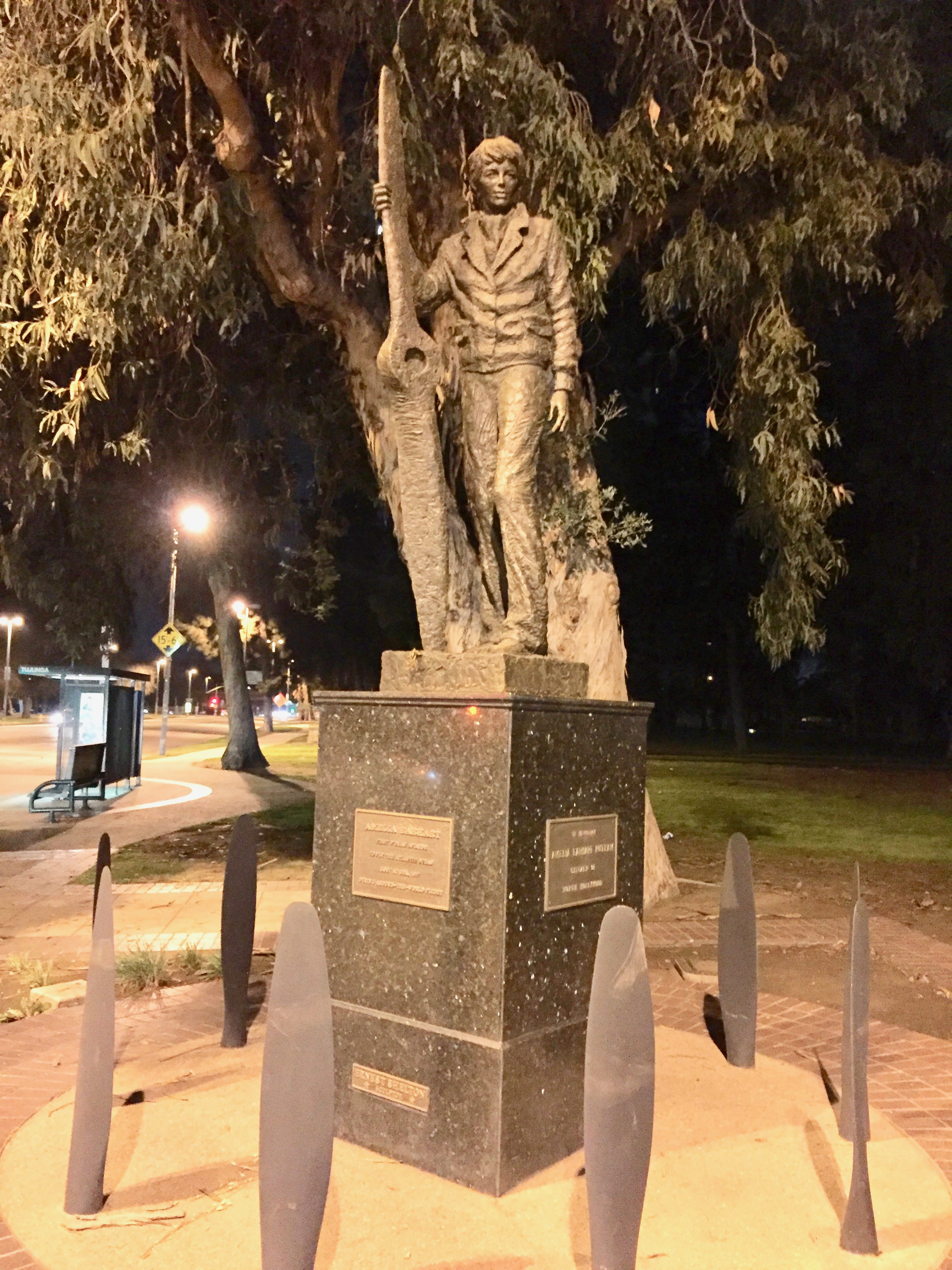
A statue in the likeness of Earhart with plane propellers stands at the corner of the block that houses the North Hollywood Amelia Earhart Regional Library.

In 1964, Purdue University opened Earhart Hall in honor of her legacy and contribution to the university during her time as a career counselor for female students and technical advisor for the aeronautics department. In 2009, Purdue erected a bronze statue of Earhart holding a propeller in front of the residence hall named after her. In 2025, the university opened a new Purdue University Airport terminal called Amelia Earhart Terminal.

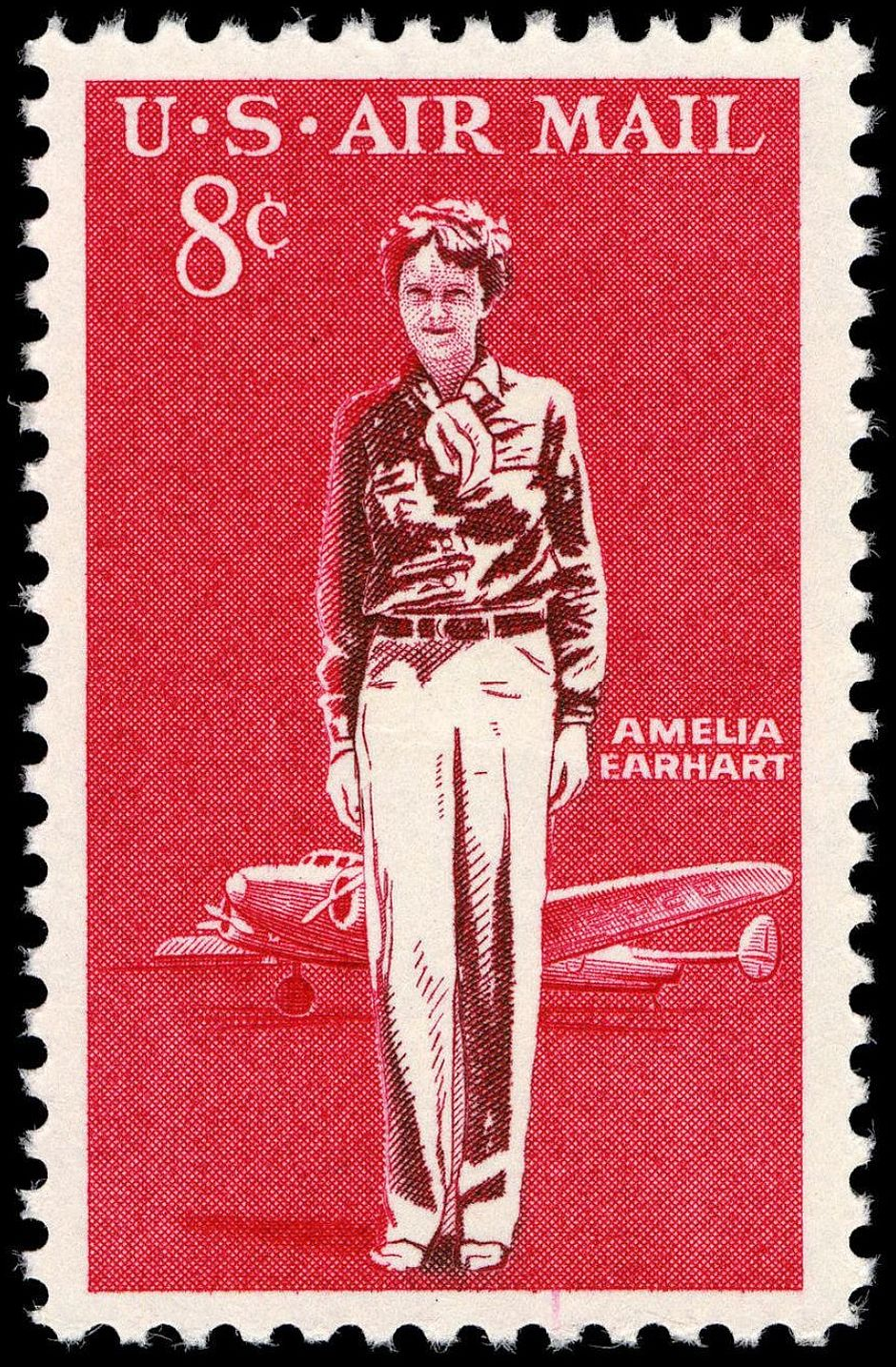
1963 U.S. Airmail Postal stamp honoring Earhart, the first woman to appear on an airmail issue

The Earhart Light, also known as the Amelia Earhart Light, is a navigational day beacon on Howland Island, where she was due to land before she went missing. It is no longer operational. Amelia Earhart Airport in Atchison, Kansas, was named in her honor.

Amelia Earhart Dam on Mystic River in eastern Massachusetts is named in her honor. The "Earhart Tree" on Banyan Drive in Hilo, Hawaii, was planted by Earhart in 1935.

==== Other ====
A small section of Earhart's Lockheed Electra starboard engine nacelle that was recovered following the March 1937 Hawaii crash has been confirmed as authentic and could be used as a control piece to help authenticate possible future discoveries.

The Amelia Earhart Fellowship was established by Zonta International in 1938. It awards US$10,000 annually to up to 30 women pursuing Ph.D. degrees in aerospace engineering and space sciences. Since the program's inception in 1938, Zonta has awarded 1,764 Amelia Earhart Fellowships, totaling more than US$11.9 million, to 1,335 women from 79 countries.

The Amelia Earhart Commemorative Stamp (8¢ airmail postage) was issued in 1963 by the United States Postmaster-General.

A statue of Earhart by Ernest Shelton was erected circa 1971 in Los Angeles, California.

Earhart was inducted into the Motorsports Hall of Fame of America in 1992.

A full-sized bronze statue of Earhart was placed at the Spirit of Flight Center in Lafayette, Colorado, in 2008.

In 2019 Time created 89 new covers to celebrate women of the year starting from 1920; it chose Earhart for 1935.

== In popular culture ==
Earhart's life has been the subject of many writers; the following collection of examples make no claims of completeness:

=== Novels, plays and poems ===
- In the 2021 alternate history novella Or Even Eagle Flew by Harry Turtledove, Earhart does not go missing in 1937 and later joins the Eagle Squadrons of the British Royal Air Force to fight against the Nazis in World War II.
- The British poet, Jemma L. King won the Terry Hetherington Young Welsh Writer of the Year Award for her poem, 'Amelia', about the disappearance of Amelia Earhart on her final flight. This was later published in King's debut collection, The Shape of a Forest.
- The events surrounding Earhart and Noonan's disappearance are dramatized in the 1996 novel I Was Amelia Earhart by Jane Mendelsohn.
- In 2011, the Great Canadian Theatre Company hosted a musical play titled Amelia: The Girl Who Wants To Fly. This is one of numerous plays on the subject.

=== Film and television ===
- The Rosalind Russell film Flight for Freedom (1943) was derived from a treatment of "Stand by to Die", a fictionalized treatment of Earhart's life.
- "Amelia Earhart: The Price of Courage" (1993) is an American Experience television documentary.
- Amelia Earhart: The Final Flight (1994) starring Diane Keaton, Rutger Hauer, and Bruce Dern, was initially released as a television movie and subsequently rereleased as a theatrical feature.
- The events surrounding Earhart and Noonan's disappearance are dramatized in the science fiction television show Star Trek: Voyager, episode "The 37's" (1995), with Sharon Lawrence portraying Earhart.
- In the biopic film Amelia (2009), Earhart is portrayed by Hilary Swank.
- In the 2009 American fantasy comedy film Night at the Museum: Battle of the Smithsonian, Earhart is portrayed by Amy Adams.
- Kristen Schaal portrayed Earhart in the 2016 comedy television series Great Minds with Dan Harmon and the adult animated science-fiction comedy television series President Curtis (since 2026).

=== Music ===
- Plainsong released a tribute album, In Search of Amelia Earhart (Elektra K42120), in 1972. Both the album and the Press Pak released by Elektra have become collectables and have gained a cult status.
- Singer Joni Mitchell's song "Amelia" appears on her album Hejira (1976) and it also features in the video of her 1980 live album Shadows and Light (1980) with clips of Earhart. Commenting on the origins of the song, which interweaves the story of a desert journey with aspects of Earhart's disappearance, Mitchell said: "I was thinking of Amelia Earhart and addressing it from one solo pilot to another ... sort of reflecting on the cost of being a woman and having something you must do".
- The 2024 Public Service Broadcasting album The Last Flight tells the story of Earhart's final flight.
- Avant-Garde musician Laurie Anderson's 2024 album "Amelia" tells the story, in the form of dated journal entries, but also in Anderson's musical style, of Earhart's attempt to circumnavigate the globe. Her performance includes vocal work by ANOHNI.

=== Other ===
- Lego produced a limited run of its Amelia Earhart Tribute 1932 Lockheed Vega 5B, Lego Model Number 40450, in 2021.
- Earhart was one of several inspiring women who are represented in a line of Barbie dolls introduced on March 6, 2018.
- Team Fortress 2 features Earhart in their comic A Cold Day in Hell. The mercenaries find her plane crashed in Siberia.
- Earhart was profiled in the National Portrait Gallery's exhibit, ONE LIFE: Amelia Earhart.
- She also has a minor planet, Venusian corona, and lunar crater named after her.

== See also ==
- 99s Museum of Women Pilots
- Amelia Earhart Park
- Amy Johnson
- Antoine de Saint-Exupéry
- Aviation archaeology
- Coast Guard Air Station Miami
- Cornelia Fort
- Douglas Corrigan
- Elsie Mackay
- Eugene Luther Vidal
- Frances Wilson Grayson
- Harriet Quimby
- Jerrie Mock
- List of female explorers and travelers
- List of people who disappeared mysteriously at sea
- Nancy Harkness Love
