= Or Even Eagle Flew =

Novella by Harry Turtledove

- First edition
- Author: Harry Turtledove
- Cover artist: Paul Guinan
- Language: English
- Genre: Alternate history novel, military fiction
- Publisher: Prince of Cats Literary Productions
- Publication date: February 9, 2021 (e-book); February 11, 2021 (trade paperback)
- Publication place: United States
- Media type: E-book and print (paperback)

Or Even Eagle Flew is an alternate history novella by Harry Turtledove. It was published on February 9, 2021 in ebook format and in trade paperback two days later.

The title of the book is derived from John Gillespie Magee Jr.'s well-known Battle of Britain poem "High Flight".

== Plot ==
Instead of disappearing on her famous 1937 voyage, Amelia Earhart is able to complete it and becomes even more famous and influential in the United States and around the world. The book begins in May 1940, with A.E. (as she is called in the text) making her way to France to join the fight against Nazi Germany during World War II, despite being in violation of U.S. neutrality laws. Eventually, she makes it to the United Kingdom and joins the Eagle Squadrons of the Royal Air Force. The book covers the period from May 1940 through early 1943, including the Battle of Britain, as well as America's entry into the war in December 1941 following the Japanese Attack on Pearl Harbor. Earhart encounters and befriends other Americans who volunteered to join the Eagle Squadrons and flew with the RAF, including Vernon Keogh, Andrew Mamedoff, and Eugene Tobin. She also encounters a number of key figures in the British government and BAF, most of whom are unenthusiastic about allowing a woman to join combat missions.
