= Last Flight (book) =

1937 book of diary entries of Amelia Earhart

- 1988 Orion Books edition
- Author: Amelia Earhart edited by George P. Putnam
- Language: English
- Genre: Travelogue, memoir
- Publisher: Harcourt, Brace and Company
- Publication date: 1937
- Publication place: United States
- Media type: Print (Paperback and hardcover)

Last Flight is a book published in 1937 consisting of diary entries and other notes compiled by aviation pioneer Amelia Earhart during her unsuccessful attempt that year at flying across the Pacific Ocean. Her husband, publisher George Palmer Putnam, edited the collection which was published posthumously as a tribute to his wife.

Consisting of hand-written diary entries, Earhart's writings cover the period from March 1937 up until her final entry on July 1, the day before her plane was reported missing en route to Howland Island in the South Pacific. The work is augmented by additional material written by Putnam, as well as a poem, "Courage", which Earhart had herself written.

Although credited to Earhart, historians have cast doubt as to how much of this book was actually written by Earhart and how much had been rewritten or embellished by Putnam.

== Summary ==
=== Chapter 1: A Pilot Grows Up by Lili Paricska and Amelia Earhart ===
Amelia Earhart explains the origin of her dream to fly a multi-motored plane, which was in May 1935 during her nonstop flight from Mexico City to New York. En route to New York, while flying her single engine Lockheed Vega, she ponders her nightmare that the only engine would "conk" or break down in mid-flight. Upon realizing "the very finest machinery could develop indigestion" Earhart vowed to never fly her beloved Vega across water ever again. Following this explanation, Earhart provides insight to her readers of the who, what, where, when, and why of her interest in aviation and her aviation career.

Earhart was ten years old when she saw her first airplane at the Iowa State Fair in Des Moines, Iowa, with which she was thoroughly unimpressed. Her following encounter with an airplane was much more significant in her memory, yet coincidentally also occurred at a fair. This fair was one held by "the aces returned from war" in Toronto, Canada, 1918, where Earhart worked as a nurse. While on their break, her and a female co-worker went to watch these "aces" at their stunt exhibition. In an attempt to be funny and scare the two women, one pilot flew low and directly over them, causing one to scamper away and the other, Amelia Earhart, to become mesmerized by her experience.

Nevertheless, Earhart continued with her medical career believing it was what interested her most; she even enrolled in Columbia University's medical program. At Columbia, she was simply going through the motions of being a physician, but her sole focus was on airplanes. When she went to California for a summer vacation, she went to every last air meet she could find, in hopes one day she would get to go up in the air herself. Recounting the day, she said "By the time I had got two or three hundred feet off the ground I knew I had to fly."

She had found her true passion, but due to the expense of buying an airplane, Earhart's mother had to help buy her first one. Amelia Earhart described her plane as "second-hand, painted bright yellow, and one of the first light airplanes developed in this country [United States of America]." Now that she had the plane, she spent a few hundred hours practicing in it and made a flight from Long Beach to Pasadena, but wanted nothing more than "to cross the continent by air". Unfortunately, she had to lend it out for demonstrations because hangar rental was also too expensive and she could not afford to pay for its storage. Then, one day, when she was working her social worker job at the Denison House, in Boston, she received a call asking if she would like to do "something dangerous in the air." After her appointment that evening with her caller, George Palmer Putnam, she was asked if she would like to fly the Atlantic, to which she quickly agreed.

From that point, she was asked to go to New York, for a proper interview; however, when she arrived, Putnam who was looking for "feminine perfection" seemed disappointed to Earhart. Although he was not pleased, he felt that she should meet the sponsors of this flight after the trouble she went through getting to New York. David T. Layman, Jr., and John S. Phipps were these representatives and they wanted a woman who was beautiful and brilliant, but not too brilliant as to outshine the men. Their verdict came a few days following their meeting with Amelia Earhart and they said that if she wished to, they would allow her to go.

Earhart never actually assisted in any three attempts to start the plane or the actual flying of the plane, as that was Lou Gordon (mechanic) and "Bill" Stultz's (pilot) job. On their fourth attempt, the "Friendship", the plane, took off and landed in Newfoundland where they stopped for thirteen days at Trepassey. Twenty hours and forty minutes later, the three found themselves in Burryport, Wales, completing their TransAtlantic flight. Although she did no actual piloting, Earhart tells that she did gain a lot of experience and "even dearer than such opportunities" (Amelia Earhart and George Palmer Putnam married in 1931). Following the "Friendship" flight, Earhart performed in a variety of flying exhibitions, but her aviation career began its climax in 1929 when the first women's derby took place. She along with various other female pilots seized this unprecedented opportunity and competed, but several plane complications ensued for most flyers.

It was not immediate that Earhart decided she wanted to cross the Atlantic, but once she told Putnam of her aspirations, he began setting it all up. After numerous hours of practicing with the newly purchased plane, Amelia Earhart had to wait for the weather to clear up for another lengthy period of time. Once she finally heard word that the sky over the Atlantic was "as good as [she is] likely to get it for sometime," she took five minutes to get ready and was off.

Earhart also puts into words that she carried a barograph, that at one point recorded a vertical drop of almost three thousand feet, yet she miraculously was able to regain control and successfully completed her flight.

== Writing and publication ==
Earhart's book, was supposed to be called World Flight; however, because she did not make it all the way around the world, Putnam opted to call it Last Flight. The majority of the information came from her narrative of the flight as she reported it by cable and telephone. She supplemented these narratives with notes and her log books, which she sent out by mail. Additionally, her own manuscript of World Flight was sent out to the publishers she promised it to, after she turned back from Honolulu. The other portion of the story that is not written by Earhart herself was from people who knew her, met her on her trips, or wrote about her. All of these pieces of her story were gathered and then compiled by Putnam.
