= California Coupe =

Coupe

General information
- Type: Cabin biplane
- National origin: United States
- Designer: John G. Montijo, Lloyd Royer
- Status: Crashed in 1925, sold as scrap.
- Number built: 1

History
- First flight: 7 May 1924

The California Coupe, also called the Royer & Montijo California Coupe, was an early cabin biplane built in California. It was built in part using parts from a crashed Dayton-Wright OW.1, the last aircraft designed by one of the Wright Brothers. The California Coupe flew in early 1924, but the next year it was damaged in a failed stunt on a movie set. Montijo and Royer were not recompensed, so the company folded and the designed was not developed further.

== Design and development ==
In 1923 John G. Montijo collaborated with Lloyd Royer on a four-passenger aircraft, the California Coupe, that would become the first cabin biplane on the United States west coast. Montijo's design closely matched the Dayton-Wright OW.1 Aerial Coupe that he had recently purchased from the Rinehart-Whelan Company in Ohio. The OW.1 had crashed in an air race in 1924, and Montijo purchased the wreck and used parts from it in the new design. The new aircraft was originally ordered on request of wealthy Dodge dealer C.E. Bellows with the intent on using a Liberty engine for power. While the California Coupe was under construction in the Kinner hangars, a client named Doc Young contracted Kinner to build a version for himself. The competing design, the Kinner Argonaut was built at the same time, with the goal to be completed before the California Coupe, with its first flight on 25 May 1924.

The California Coupe was an enclosed biplane with conventional landing gear, fabric covered wings and very tall and narrow undercarriage that was built in a hangar rented from aircraft maker and engine producer Bert Kinner at Kinner Field. The Coupe, powered by a 200 hp (149.14 kW) Wright-Hisso V-8 engine, was constructed using Haskelite bonded plywood and had a 20 US gal (75.71 L) fuel header tank in the upper mainplane, fed by a wind driven pump from a 20 US gal (75.71 L) main fuel tank under the cabin.

== Operational history ==
A novelty in the early 1920s was to get married in an aircraft. The California Coupe was used in an aerial wedding with its designer Montijo as the best man. During a 1925 filming of "Partners Again" one of the 'Potash and Perlmutter' series of films at Clover Field in Santa Monica, a vehicle performing a stunt ran headlong into the California Coupe ripping off the main gear and one wing, sending it into a brick wall.

== Aftermath ==
Montijo and Royer sued the film production company without success, so the California company was dissolved after the total loss of its major asset without compensation. Royer worked as a mechanic to pay off the rent owed to Kinner. Amelia Earhart, a close friend and employer of Royer, wrote to Royer asking him to keep some of the proceeds of the sale of her truck business after all the trouble he had with his aircraft venture. Kinner later loaned Royer $350 in 1927 to start his new aircraft production business building the Waterhouse and Royer Cruisair, which also did not go into production, but the plans were sold and used as the basis of the Ryan M-1. Montijo would go on to start another collaborative aircraft, the 1928 Warren & Montijo Monoplane.

== Specifications (California Coupe) ==
Data from Grand Central Air Terminal

General characteristics

- Crew: 1
- Capacity: 4 passengers / 1,290 lb (585.13 kg)
- Wingspan: 40 ft (12 m)
- Empty weight: 1,290 lb (585 kg)
- Powerplant: 1 × Wright-Hisso V-8 water-cooled piston engine, 200 hp (150 kW)

Performance

- Maximum speed: 97 kn (112 mph, 180 km/h)
- Stall speed: 42 kn (48 mph, 77 km/h)

== See also ==
Aircraft of comparable role, configuration, and era

- Dayton-Wright OW.1 Aerial Coupe
- Paramount Cabinaire
