= Quiet Birdmen =

American secret society for male aviators

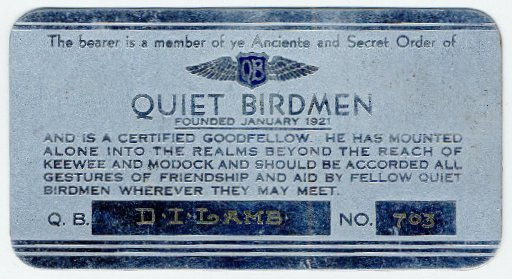
Dean Ivan Lamb's membership card

The Quiet Birdmen is a secretive club in the United States for male aviators. Founded in 1921 by World War I pilots, the organization meets in various locations, never announced to the public. Members, called QBs, must be invited to join, and they join for life. Today, the club's membership, organized into regional "hangars", is made up of general aviators, commercial pilots, flight instructors, active or retired airline, military and freight pilots, as well as astronauts. It is also known as ye Anciente and Secret Order of Quiet Birdmen.

== History ==
In France in November 1919, a group of World War I aviators started a drinking club called "The American Flying Club", and re-convened in New York City only to be barred from their clubhouse by the bailiff. In January 1921, a subset of that group, some ten to twenty aviators, began meeting fairly regularly on Monday nights in New York City at Marta, an Italian restaurant located at 75 Washington Place in the Greenwich Village neighborhood. Harold Hersey, the editor of Aces High magazine, ironically called the group the Quiet Birdmen because they were so boisterous. At one meeting, reporter Steve Hannigan noticed the jocular group, and visited again the next week, bringing a sketch artist. Hannigan wrote up a feature story about the group, accompanied by a sketch—the first public information about the group. The attendees that night were Harry Bruno; S. H. MacKeon; Wallace James; Richard R. "Dick" Blythe; Earle D. Osborn; Charles S. "Casey" Jones; Harold T. "Slim" Lewis; Ernest Loftquis; Paul G. Zimmerman; Donald Mcllhenny; Ladislas d'Orcy; Richard H. DePew Jr; George Hubbard; Robert B. C. Noorduyn; John (Jack) Bishop; and J. E. Whitbeck.

Because the group grew too large, or because of the noise bothering other patrons, the management at Marta stopped them from meeting there. Subsequent meetings were held in a different location each time, often a restaurant. Membership in the 1920s cost one dollar and lasted until death. In the 1920s, the emblem of the club was created: a blue shield with the letters QB in silver, the shield flanked by silver wings. In 1938, the club's meetings settled into the building owned by the Architectural League of New York.

Early members Bruno and Blythe started a public relations firm in 1923 and in 1927 they became known for promoting Charles Lindbergh's solo trans-Atlantic flight. Lindbergh was made a member of the Quiet Birdmen. Unusually, a former combat foe was invited to join the club: Ernst Udet, the highest-scoring German flying ace to survive World War I. Known as a fun-loving playboy, Udet performed aerobatics at the National Air Races in Cleveland in 1931 and '32, Los Angeles in '33, and again in Cleveland in '38. While visiting the U.S., Udet befriended Lindbergh, Eddie Rickenbacker, Jimmy Doolittle, Wiley Post, Roscoe Turner and other American QBs.

Outside of New York, other Quiet Birdmen regional groups, or hangars, were formed. Before 1938, the club had a strict agreement against having a constitution, by-laws, dues, assessments, or club officers. No business was to be conducted, and no sales. Only male aviators were allowed to join, not female aviators or "Keewees" (non-flyers). At the Cleveland Air Races in 1938, the QBs adopted a slightly more formal arrangement: a Board of Governors would be composed of one member from each hangar, and this board would choose an Executive Committee. Each regional hangar was to select a Key Man to handle club business. A year later, the group settled upon a QB Code of Procedure which described the structure of the club. During World War II in London, England, a temporary hangar was formed in 1943 for club members posted to the UK. The club's national Code of Procedure was modified again in 1953.

In addition to the still existing New York Hangar, other early Hangars, originally called "leantos" to the original New York Hangar, had been formed. Currently there are 277 Hangars, formed independently and exist in Akron, Ohio Washington DC, Cleveland, Atlantic City, Wayne, San Francisco Bay Area, California, Los Angeles, Palomar in San Diego County, Oxnard/Santa Barbara, Fresno, Santa Ana, Long Beach, Palm Desert, Rhode Island, Ocala, Seattle, North Cascade in northern Washington, Milwaukee, Fort Worth, Amarillo, Dallas, Houston, Phoenix, Columbia, Hilton Head and Greenville, Daytona Beach, Honolulu, Kalamazoo, Lansing, Boise, Hartford, Rockford, Akron, Indiana, Syracuse, Las Vegas, Cincinnati, Tampa Bay, Orlando, Melbourne, Venice, Stuart, Jackson, Knoxville, Wilmington, Greensboro, New Orleans, Cape Cod, Kansas City, Austin, Dallas, San Antonio, Buffalo, Rochester, Binghamton, Fort Smith, Chicago, Jackson Hole, Boston, Somerville, Hilton Head, Anchorage, Hagerstown, Denver, Pittsburgh, Harrisburg, Philadelphia, Allentown, Reading, Atlanta, Waterloo, Tulsa, Shreveport, Colorado Springs, Salt Lake City, Pensacola, Trenton, Bangor, Maine, Portland, Oregon, and other cities throughout the US, Alaska and Hawaii.

== Activities ==
Depending on its location, QB regular activities generally reflect the age of its members. Typical QB get-togethers start with a silent toast to deceased members, glasses raised to the west in keeping with an old pilot's expression euphemistically referring to death as having "Gone West." Food and drink are served, and perhaps a talk or other program is given. Stories of flying and experiences in aviation are often told. Off-color jokes are plentiful.

The Quiet Birdmen print a periodical called BEAM which features stories, jokes, and news of hangar get-togethers. No photos of QB parties are allowed in the journal. From time to time, various hangars have published commemorative membership books consisting of a brief recounting of the club's history, and photograph portraits of individual members. One such book was owned by club member K. S. "Slim" Lindsay, printed in May 1936. After Lindsay's death, it was donated in 2007 by his daughter to Wright State University. The leather-bound book has 160 pages and 640 photographs of Quiet Birdmen including portraits of Jimmy Doolittle, Wiley Post, Roscoe Turner, Walter R. Brookins and Ephraim Watkins "Pop" Cleveland. Another QB book was donated to the National Air and Space Museum by Arthur Raymond Brooks; it contains photographs of the members of the New York hangar and a description of the history and by-laws of the club.

Astronaut Edward Givens died in a car crash following a QB meeting. On a rainy Monday night, June 5, 1967, the Houston hangar of Quiet Birdmen met at the Skylane Motel on Telephone Road in Pearland, Texas. Fellow astronaut Gordon Cooper was there, and so were two U.S. Air Force reservists who had just been invited to their first QB meeting: Major William "Bill" Hall and Lieutenant Colonel Francis "Fran" Dellorto. Hall and Dellorto were told that they would become full members after attending twelve meetings. Givens was not drinking alcoholic beverages at the party as he was required at an important meeting the following morning. Between 11:30 pm and midnight, Givens offered Hall and Dellorto a ride back to their quarters at Ellington Air Force Base in Houston, and the three left the motel in Givens' Volkswagen Beetle. Givens drove north toward the main east–west highway, but mistakenly turned east onto parallel Knapp Road. He missed a sharp turn in the road and the car crashed into an irrigation ditch. Though he was wearing his lap belt, Givens' chest was crushed against the steering wheel. In the front passenger seat, Dellorto was seriously injured, while in the back seat, Hall was in fair condition. Givens, 37 years old, died on the way to the hospital early on June 6, pronounced dead on arrival at 12:40 am.

In Ventura, California, on a Monday night in October 1974, Ben Rich gave a talk to the Oxnard and Santa Barbara hangar of Quiet Birdmen about the Skunk Works program at Lockheed. Rich spoke of the Lockheed U-2 and SR-71 Blackbird programs which had recently been declassified, and identified QB member and attendee R. Scott Beat as a former U-2 pilot. Beat wrote in his book So Many Ways to Die: Surviving As a Spy in the Sky that this was the first time any of his friends or family had heard of that part of his past—he had faithfully kept the government's secrets to himself.

Beginning in 1971, rancher and aviator John S. "Jack" Broome, a founding member of the Oxnard hangar, held an annual private airshow and barbecue for the Quiet Birdmen at his ranch in Camarillo, California. Members of the Commemorative Air Force and Planes of Fame often piloted several of their warbirds at the events. After Broome died in April 2009, the 39th annual airshow was held in his memory in June 2009. The Broome family hosted one final private airshow for the Quiet Birdmen on June 14, 2010.

== Notable members ==
- Buzz Aldrin
- Edwin Eugene Aldrin Sr.
- Walter Beech
- Floyd Bennett
- Forrest Bird
- Ennio Bolognini
- Arthur Raymond Brooks
- Jack Broome
- Harry Bruno
- Richard E. Byrd
- Gordon Cooper
- Glenn Curtiss
- Eugene Peyton Deatrick
- Jimmy Doolittle
- Charles Stark Draper
- Robert G. Fowler
- Fitzhugh Fulton
- Ernest K. Gann
- Edward Givens
- Chalmers Goodlin
- Philip Greenspun
- Najeeb Halaby
- Caleb V. Haynes
- Cliff Henderson
- Bob Hoover
- Elrey Borge Jeppesen
- Alvin M. Johnston
- Bert Kinner
- Fiorello LaGuardia, Mayor of New York
- Dean Ivan Lamb
- Walter E. Lees
- Tony LeVier
- Charles Lindbergh
- John H. Livingston
- Johnny Miller
- Edgar Mitchell
- Zack Mosley
- David Oreck
- Clyde Edward Pangborn
- Wiley Post
- Oliver Parks
- Eddie Rickenbacker
- Charles E. Rosendahl
- Burt Rutan
- Johnny Rutherford, Three Time Indy 500 Winner
- Wally Schirra
- Igor Sikorsky
- Charles Kingsford Smith
- Dean Smith, of the Byrd Expeditions, Air Mail Pilot
- Lloyd Stearman
- Moye W. Stephens
- Jack Swigert
- Richard G. Thomas
- Juan Trippe
- Roscoe Turner
- Ernst Udet
- Albert Lee Ueltschi
- Hoyt Vandenberg
- Jerry Vasconcells
- Chance M. Vought
- Dwane Wallace
- Fred Weick
- George Hubert Wilkins
- Alfred Worden
- Harry Hurt

== See also ==
- Order of Daedalians
