= Amelia Earhart (film) =

1976 American biographical film

- TV Guide promotional photo
- Genre: Biographical drama
- Written by: Carol Sobieski
- Directed by: George Schaefer
- Starring: Susan Clark; John Forsythe; Stephen Macht; Jane Wyatt
- Music by: David Shire
- Country of origin: United States
- Original language: English

Production
- Producer: George Eckstein
- Cinematography: Ted Voigtlander
- Editor: Jim Benson
- Running time: 150 minutes
- Production company: Universal Television

Original release
- Network: NBC
- Release: October 25, 1976

Amelia Earhart is a 1976 American biographical drama television film directed by George Schaefer and written by Carol Sobieski. It stars Susan Clark as Amelia Earhart, and John Forsythe as her husband, George P. Putnam.

Unlike more recent depictions of Earhart's life, this film makes an attempt to cover her entire life from her childhood on a Kansas farm, her nursing during World War I, an early boyfriend, employment at a Boston children's orphanage, her interest and exploits in aviation, her marriage to Putnam, and her famous disappearance in 1937.

The film was the first dramatization of Earhart's life and co-starred a parade of well-known actors of the time and originally premiered on NBC Monday Night at the Movies on October 25, 1976.

== Plot ==
In 1907, when Amelia Earhart is nine years old, growing up on a Kansas farm, she is an intelligent and precocious child. She builds a play aircraft with her sister "Pidge." Later, as America enters World War I in 1917, Amelia, now a college student working in a doctor's office, decides to join the war effort and become a nurse. One night on the roof of her building, while on break with a coworker, she sees an aircraft, rekindling her childhood interest in aviation.

In 1921, a young Earhart has her first training flight with female flight instructor Neta Snook. That same year, she buys her first aircraft, a Kinner "Canary," with the blessing of her father, who has become a chronic alcoholic. In 1924, she and her mother embark on a cross-country road trip from Los Angeles to Boston in an open roadster, engaging in arguments along the way. In Boston, Earhart has an on-and-off relationship with a young man and later works in a children's orphanage, using whatever little money she saves to subsidize her passion for flying.

In 1928, while employed at the orphanage, Earhart is invited to become the first woman ever to fly the Atlantic in a fixed-wing aircraft, the Fokker "Friendship." However, she flies as a passenger, with pilot Wilmer Stultz and copilot Lou Gordon (Steve Kanaly) at the controls. That same year, she pilots her Avro Avian biplane in a coast-to-coast, stop-and-go flight, where some southern locals recognize her from the transatlantic Friendship flight. Not satisfied with having been a passenger on the Friendship flight, Earhart yearns to fly the Atlantic again as the first solo female aviator to do so. She marries George Putnam in a quasi arranged or open-marriage. This marriage to wealthy Putnam enables her to buy an expensive high performance red Lockheed Vega with which she plans the solo Atlantic flight. Earhart decides to leave Newfoundland on May 20, 1932, the fifth anniversary of Charles Lindbergh's 1927 flight.

Her marriage to media tycoon George Palmer Putnam, who had been her publicist since the Friendship flight, and a series of record-breaking flights propel her to international fame as a long-distance flyer. Despite her open and frequently strained relationship with Putnam, she develops a close bond with his son David. With help from a close friend and adviser, Paul Mantz, Earhart plans her longest flight ever—a round-the-world attempt in 1937. The disappearance of Earhart and her navigator Fred Noonan during the last stage of the flight leads to a massive but fruitless search effort, solidifying Earhart as an aviation icon.

== Cast ==
- Susan Clark as Amelia Earhart
- John Forsythe as George P. Putnam
- Stephen Macht as Paul Mantz
- Susan Oliver as Neta Snook/Snookie
- Catherine Burns as Pidge Earhart
- Jane Wyatt as Amy Earhart
- Charles Aidman as Mr. Earhart
- Eddie Barth as Sid Isaacs
- Bill Vint as Fred Noonan (inaccurately written as "Fred Norman")
- Jack Colvin as Wilmer Stultz
- Steve Kanaly as Lou Gordon
- John Archer as Dr. Paterson
- Florida Friebus as Miss Perkins
- Lance Kerwin as David Putnam
- Kim Diamond as Young Amelia Earhart
- Lowell Thomas as Broadcaster
- Colleen Camp as Starlet
- David Huffman as Itasca Radio Operator
- Kip Niven as Allen Bradford(her boyfriend)
- Kathleen O'Malley as Mrs Gallagher

Susan Clark in a promotional image for the production

== Production ==
The film dramatized Earhart's life, but "refuses to speculate on the cause of Ms. Earhart's disappearance during a round-the-world trip in 1937"; however despite the lack of speculation "the clues that do exist are presented in full". Mainly staying close to the historical record, one departure is portraying stunt pilot Paul Mantz as her "purported lover", a long-standing rumor that has never been substantiated. Sobieski's screenplay drew on "her own experiences as a licensed pilot".

Principal photography took place at Camarillo Airport, California, with aerial sequences flown by well-known aerobatic pilot Art Scholl and Frank Tallman, owner of Tallmantz Aviation, a company primarily involved in flying for film and television production. A de Havilland Moth appeared in place of the Avro Avian that Earhart had purchased in England. A Lockheed 12A (S/N 1204), was featured as Earhart's famed Lockheed Model 10 Electra, used in the circumnavigational flight of the globe in 1937.

== Reception ==
Interest in the story of Amelia Earhart, especially with the release of Amelia (2009) led film reviewers to recall the earlier Earhart portrayals. Rosalind Russell had played "an Earhart-esque flier in 1943's Flight for Freedom" and Diane Keaton starred in the 1994 TNT movie Amelia Earhart: The Final Flight. Susan Clark's performance compared favorably among the Earhart movies.

Amelia Earhart was nominated for a 1977 Emmy awards with William H. Tuntke (art director) and Richard Friedman (set decorator) nominated for Outstanding Art Direction or Scenic Design for a Dramatic Special; both Susan Clark and Susan Oliver were nominated for their work in the category of Actress in a Drama or Comedy Special, Clark for Outstanding Lead Actress and Oliver for Outstanding Performance by a Supporting Actress. The production was also nominated for the 1977 Golden Globe award for Best Motion Picture Made for TV.

Amelia Earhart was screened at the AFI/Los Angeles International Film Festival (AFI FEST salutes the television movie), June 18–July 2, 1992.
