= John G. Montijo =

American aircraft engineer and instructor

- Born: 25 May 1891
- Died: 1 May 1935 (aged 43); Walsenburg, Colorado
- Cause of death: Aircraft crash
- Resting place: Abbey Mausoleum, Long Beach California
- Other name: Monte
- Employer: California Polytechnic State University
- Spouse: Alta Margrete
- Children: Jim and John Montijo
- Parent: Monte Montijo

John G. Montijo (1891–1935) was an American aircraft engineer and instructor.

Montijo taught at the California Polytechnic State University. Montijo taught flight instruction to Amelia Earhart in a Kinner Airster after crashing with her first instructor Neta Snook.

== Early life ==
Montijo was an experienced flight instructor for the U.S. Army Air Corps in World War I. After being discharged he moved to Lima, Peru to oversee an American airport project. Shortly afterward, he moved to Long Beach, California, and became one of the earliest licensed Hispanic pilots in the United States.

== Early Long Beach Aviation ==
In February 1921 Montijo competed in the Southern California Aero Club air races in a Bluebird Airplanes Inc. biplane named "The Desert Rat". Afterward, Montijo and pilot D.D. France flew a 2200-mile flight over the Mojave Desert and Imperial desert.

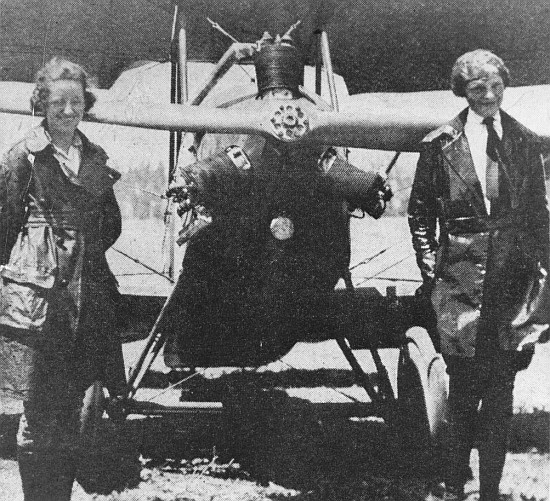
L–R: Neta Snook and Amelia Earhart in front of Earhart's Kinner Airster, c. 1921

In 1922 Montijo was working with Bert Kinner, maker of aircraft and aircraft engines as a test pilot and instructor. Three women had purchased Kinner aircraft that year, and Montijo was recommended for instruction. One was an Osage Indian, the others were Alosia McClintock, and Amelia Earhart who needed a new instructor after Neta Snook. As a condition, basic aerobatics were taught before Earhart was allowed to solo.

Montijo worked as a flying stuntman for Goldwyn Pictures. He was the first to perform a stunt of picking a man out of a moving automobile with an airplane. During the same period, he worked briefly as William Randolph Hearst's personal pilot.

In 1923 Montijo collaborated with Lloyd Royer on a four-passenger aircraft, the California Coupe, that would become the first cabin biplane on the United States West coast. The aircraft was built in a rented hangar owned by Kinner. During a 1925 filming of "Partners Again" one of the 'Potash and Perlmutter' series of films, A vehicle performing a stunt ran headlong into the California Coupe ripping off the main gear, and one wing, sending it into a brick wall.

In 1924, Montijo became the first member of the City of Long Beach's aviation commission. The following year, Montijo and C.B. Boone leased the first space at the new Long Beach Airport. A hangar and flight school were built on the property and sold to Earl Daugherty.

In 1928, Montijo and students of Cal Poly designed and built the Warren & Montijo Monoplane. Montijo used the aircraft to promote the Pacific Southwest Exhibition, for the Long Beach city council, dropping leaflets over many California cities with good success. Montijo's aircraft would be modified and known by many names, eventually become the first aerial broadcasting aircraft, transmitting radio over Hollywood. Montijo later flew for Varney Air Lines flying a 1929 Lockheed Vega modified to a 5C model. On 1 May 1935, he was on a newly modified route from Pueblo to El Paso when he died in an aircrash when one wing hit the ground in a low pass. He was dropping a letter to schoolchildren at Rattlesnake Butte in Walsenburg, Colorado asking if Easter eggs he had dropped before had broken. His Long Beach procession included twenty aircraft.

Montijo's children remained active in aviation after his death, his son went on to be a P-51 pilot in the 353rd Fighter Squadron in WWII, and was hired to manage the La Cresta Airfield in Bakersfield, California on its opening. The airfield was known as Monty's La Cresta Airfield in honor of his father.
