= Miss Veedol =

First aeroplane to fly non-stop across the Pacific Ocean

Miss Veedol / The American Nurse
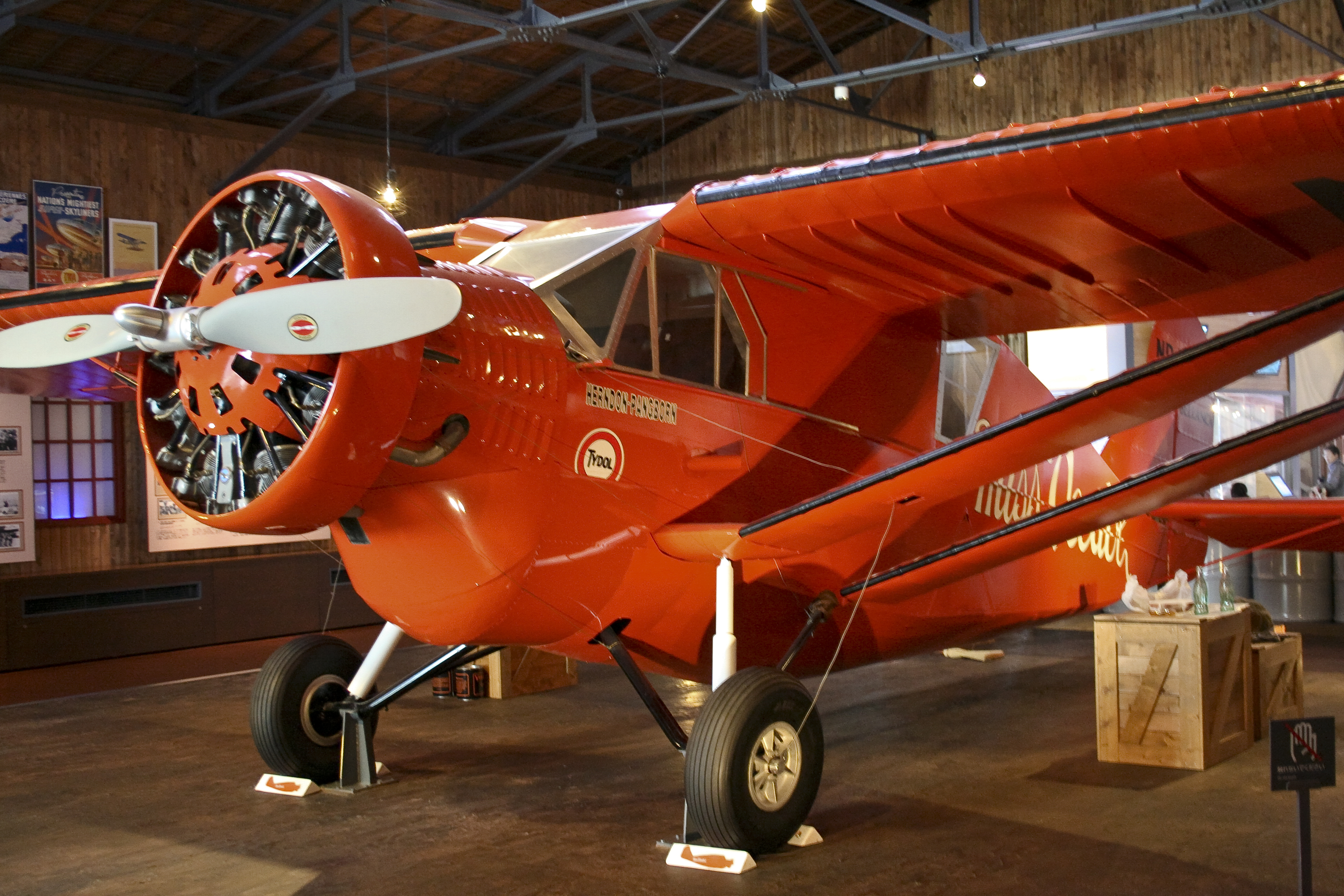
- Replica of Miss Veedol in the Misawa Aviation & Science Museum, Aomori, Japan. (When the plane was renamed The American Nurse, it was painted white with yellow wings).

General information
- Type: Bellanca CH-400 or Bellanca J-300
- Owners: Hugh Herndon (Miss Veedol); A group headed by Dr. Leon Martocci-Pisculli (The American Nurse)
- Registration: NR796W

History
- Fate: Lost September 1932

Miss Veedol was the first aeroplane to fly non-stop across the Pacific Ocean. On October 5, 1931, Clyde Pangborn and co-pilot Hugh Herndon landed in the hills of East Wenatchee, Washington, following a 41-hour flight from Sabishiro Beach, Misawa, Japan, across the northern Pacific. The flight won the pair the 1931 Harmon Trophy in recognition of the greatest achievement in flight for that year.

Miss Veedol was later sold and renamed The American Nurse. On a 1932 flight from New York City to Rome for aviation medicine research, she was last sighted by an ocean liner in the eastern Atlantic, before disappearing without a trace.

== Aircraft ==
Miss Veedol was a 1931 Bellanca CH-400 or Bellanca J-300 Long-Distance Special, registration NR796W. It was built at Bellanca Airfield in New Castle, Delaware. It could carry 696 US gallons (2,630 L) of fuel. Clyde Pangborn and Hugh Herndon modified Miss Veedol while being held in Japan – on unfounded suspicions of spying – to be able to carry more fuel, and to be able to jettison the landing gear. Miss Veedol carried an initial load of 915 US gallons (3,460 L) of aviation gasoline on her record-breaking flight.

Miss Veedol was named for the motor oil brand, as it was sponsored by Veedol's producer, the Tide Water Oil Company (Tydol). Herndon's mother, Alice Carter Herndon, was the heiress of the Tide Water Oil Company.

== Pangborn / Herndon ==
=== Attempted round-the-world flight ===
Pangborn and Herndon had been trying to set a speed record for a round-the-world flight, but after a number of delays along the way including a damaging landing in Khabarovsk, in the Soviet Far East, they found themselves 27 hours behind schedule and had to concede to the record set earlier that year by Wiley Post and Harold Gatty.

=== Transpacific flight ===
Looking for a worthwhile aviation record to set, they decided to modify Miss Veedol to make the first non-stop trans-Pacific flight, for which the Japanese newspaper Asahi Shimbun had offered a $25,000 prize.

Loaded well beyond the manufacturer's maximum operating weight, on October 4, 1931 (Japanese time), Miss Veedol only barely managed to take off from a specially prepared area of Sabishiro Beach. The landing gear was jettisoned as planned, three hours after takeoff, but two supporting struts remained attached, making it necessary for Pangborn to climb out onto the wing struts in flight to remove them manually. Pangborn subsequently criticized Herndon for his alleged negligence in allowing the engine to become starved of fuel. Pangborn had to dive the aircraft down to 1400 feet before the engine restarted. Later, Pangborn, needing some sleep, instructed Herndon to wake him when he saw the city lights of Vancouver, Canada. However, Herndon wandered off-course and missed both Vancouver and Seattle.

Upon reaching the Pacific Northwest they found that the weather was cloudy and rainy over most of the area. They first considered going on to Boise, Idaho, to add the "longest flight" to their "nonstop Pacific crossing" record. Soon, they found that weather would prevent their landing in Boise, so they turned towards Spokane, Washington. When the weather also prevented their landing there, they headed southwest towards Pasco in the Tri-Cities area of the state. When that failed, they finally headed towards Wenatchee to land at Fancher Field, far from town. There, they had to make a belly landing because they had jettisoned Miss Veedol's landing gear over the western Pacific. She was damaged, but repairable, and her propeller was wrecked, but Herndon and Pangborn came through the landing all right. The bent propeller, the only part of the plane that is known to exist, is exhibited in the Wenatchee Valley Museum & Cultural Center in Wenatchee, Washington.

Pangborn and Herndon did not qualify for the $100,000 prize offered by the (Japanese) Imperial Aeronautics Association (which was limited to Japanese aviators) or the $28,000 prize offered by a group of Seattle businessmen (which was for a flight originating in Seattle and ending in Japan). As Herndon and his mother were the main financial backers of the flight, they kept almost all the Asahi Shimbun prize money and the proceeds of the sale of Miss Veedol. Pangborn received $2500 for his part and continued, much as before, as an airmail pilot, air racer, and a test and demonstration pilot.

== The American Nurse ==
Miss Veedol was subsequently sold and eventually ended up owned by a group including Dr. Leon Martocci-Pisculli (usually referred to as Pisculli), who recruited pilot William Ulbrich and copilot Gladys Bramhall Wilner (13 August 1910 – 3 July 2009) for a record New York City to Rome flight. Plans included a flyover of Florence, Italy, where Wilner, a licensed pilot, nurse and experienced parachute jumper, was to parachute to the ground in honor of Florence Nightingale.

Pisculli was the commander of the flight. He was a gynaecologist and held at least three patents for medical devices (a formaldehyde thermometer-holder, a medicated pessary and a form of tampon) and a patent for a toy operating on the same principle as a ouija board. He was born in Italy and became a naturalized US citizen sometime between 25 June 1917 and 8 October 1919 (as revealed by comparing his two earliest patent applications). Pisculli was 53 years old at the time of the flight and resided in Yonkers, New York. He was the founder and director of the American Nurses' Aviation Service, Inc, which sought to promote the provision of medical care in aviation and through aviation to others. As this flight was sponsored by the American Nurses' Aviation Service, Inc, the aircraft was renamed The American Nurse.

The pilot, William Ulbrich, was born in Denmark and was a resident of Mineola, New York. He was 31 at the time of the flight. A barnstormer and flight instructor in earlier years, in September 1932, Ulbrich held a transport pilot's licence and had 3,800 hours flying experience.

The third member of the crew was originally intended to be Wilner. However, she declined to take part. She was replaced by Edna Newcomer from Williamsport, Pennsylvania, who was also a nurse, pilot, and parachute jumper. Wilner died at the age of 98 in Jacksonville, Florida; she was the last surviving person to have flown in Miss Veedol (as The American Nurse).

Dr. Pisculli's intention for the flight was to study the effects of fatigue in long-distance aviation and to test his hypothesis that the loss of many previous long-distance flights had been due to the buildup of carbon monoxide in the crew compartment. For the purpose of the first study, the three crew members underwent pre-flight physical examinations, basal metabolism tests, electrocardiograms, and blood chemistry examinations. Pisculli was to take blood samples during the flight, and the basal metabolism tests would have been repeated on arrival in Rome. In respect of his second concern, he brought a woodchuck named "Tail Wind" on the flight as a carbon monoxide detector, due to the species' sensitivity to the gas. (Pisculli had found Tail Wind with a broken leg on a road in Westchester County, New York, and had nursed it back to health.) His more general objective was to encourage physicians and nurses to learn to fly and parachute jump, so that they might put these skills to use in emergency medicine. Pisculli planned a tour of several European cities and that The American Nurse would return to the United States via Ireland in the spring of 1933.

Carrying fuel for a 32-hour flight, The American Nurse took off from Floyd Bennett Field at 6:16 am EST on 13 September 1932. Clyde Pangborn was present to see his former aircraft depart. The weather in the North Atlantic was reported to be ideal for the flight. Ulbrich took the "southern" route across the North Atlantic and planned to make landfall in the vicinity of Cape Finisterre, Spain. He estimated that the 6,884-kilometre (4,278 mi) flight should take 25 to 26 hours. The aircraft was subsequently sighted over Cape Cod, Massachusetts, then by the American Oil Co. tanker Winnebago in mid-Atlantic at 5:50 pm EST and lastly by the liner SS France 640 kilometres (400 mi) from its intended landfall in Europe. No further trace of The American Nurse and its crew was ever found.

Reports that the aircraft had been sighted over Sardinia could not be confirmed, nor did a search of the central Italian mountains find anything.

== Artifact and commemorations ==
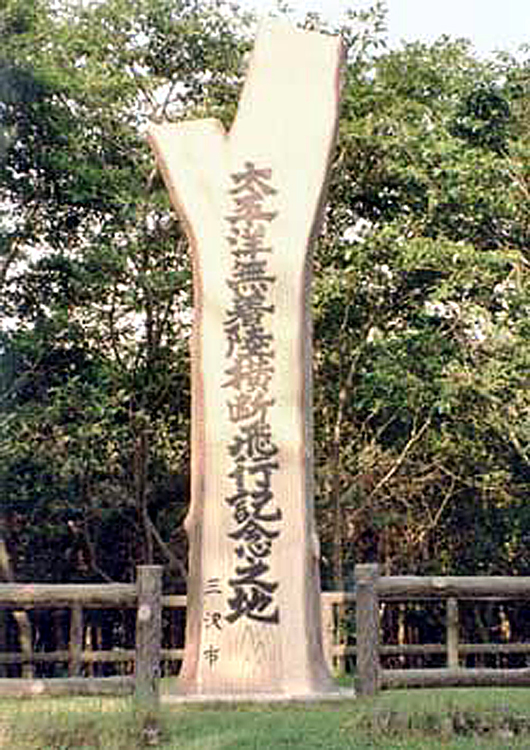
This monument in Misawa, Japan, commemorates the flight of Miss Veedol.

Miss Veedol's propeller, damaged in the trans-Pacific landing, is exhibited at the Wenatchee Valley Museum & Cultural Center in Wenatchee, Washington.

The Pangborn-Herndon Memorial Site is northeast of East Wenatchee, Washington; the main feature is a basalt column designed by Walter Graham. The site gives views of the Columbia River and the East Wenatchee and Wenatchee Valleys. There is also a public mural in East Wenatchee depicting Miss Veedol's Pacific crossing.

In addition to the Miss Veedol replica in the Misawa Aviation and Science Museum, there was a somewhat cruder replica of Miss Veedol on display outdoors on Sabishiro Beach at 40.745500°N 141.415361°E until it was destroyed during the 11 March 2011 tsunami which caused widespread damage in the coastal area of Northeast Honshu. The replica had been replaced as of 2013.

A flying replica of Miss Veedol was built over a period of four-plus years by Experimental Aircraft Association Chapter 424. This replica (also known as Spirit of Wenatchee) first flew in May 2003. This aircraft is based at East Wenatchee, Washington.

== See also ==
- Spirit of St. Louis
- Plus Ultra
- Bird of Paradise
- Bremen
