= CP1 =

CP1 may refer to:

- CP1 (classification), a disability sport classification specific to cerebral palsy
- Am star, a class of chemically peculiar stars
- Chicago Pile-1, the World's first artificial nuclear reactor
- Complex projective line ($\mathbb{CP}^1$), or Riemann sphere, in mathematics
- Vektor CP1, a South African pistol
- Warren CP-1, an experimental monoplane
- CP1: an EEG electrode site according to the 10-20 system
- Pasir Ris MRT station, MRT station code
- Cours Préparatoire 1^{re} année, first year of primary education in the French-like education system (e.g. Côte d'Ivoire)
- CP1: An A Level Further Maths topic.
