= City of Warsaw (disambiguation) =

Warsaw is the capital of Poland.

City of Warsaw may also refer to:

- No. 316 Polish Fighter Squadron
- The airplane flown by the Adamowicz brothers
- City of Warsaw Library
- Warsaw, Indiana
