= Clyde Pangborn =

American aviator (1895–1958)

- Born: October 28, 1895; Bridgeport, Washington, U.S.
- Died: March 29, 1958 (aged 62)
- Height: 5 ft 4 in (163 cm)
- Spouse: Swana Beaucaire
- Parent(s): Max Pangborn; Opal Lamb

Clyde Edward Pangborn (c. October 28, 1895 – March 29, 1958), nicknamed "Upside-Down Pangborn", was an American aviator and barnstormer who performed aerial stunts in the 1920s for the Gates Flying Circus. He was its half-owner, chief pilot and operating manager, working in partnership with Ivan R. Gates. In 1931, Pangborn and co-pilot Hugh Herndon Jr. flew their plane, Miss Veedol, on the first non-stop flight across the Pacific Ocean.

== Early life and career ==
Clyde Edward Pangborn, son of Max and Opal Lamb Pangborn, was born in Bridgeport, Washington, near Lake Chelan. His exact birth year is uncertain, because he used 1893, 1894, 1895, and 1896, on various documents, changing his age to appear older or younger as needed. The 1900 United States census listed Clyde Pangborn (b. October 1893) and his brother Percy (b. January 1891) living with their mother Ola [sic.] in Spokane, Washington. In 1910 Clyde (age 16) and Percy (age 19) were boarders with the Alfred Heimark family in St. Maries, Benawah County, Idaho. Census day was April 15; Clyde would not be 17 until October. "1895" was used on his World War I draft registration in Shoshone, Idaho. When he was two years old, his parents divorced and he moved to Idaho with his mother. He graduated from high school in 1914 and enrolled in the University of Idaho, where he studied civil engineering for two and a half years. Pangborn was a first cousin of American composer George Frederick McKay (1899–1970), who grew up in Spokane, Washington, and used the penname Arthur Pangborn for the lyrics for some of his compositions.

After college, Pangborn worked briefly as an engineer for a mining company before he joined the Air Service during World War I. He completed flight training and was subsequently stationed as a flight instructor at Ellington Field in Houston, Texas. While teaching cadets how to fly the Curtiss JN-4 "Jenny" biplane, Pangborn learned to roll his plane onto its back and fly upside-down for extended periods, which earned him the nickname "Upside-Down Pang".

== Aviation career ==
=== Barnstorming ===
After World War I, Pangborn took up barnstorming, exhibition flying, and aerial acrobatics, which he did for the next nine years. He performed as a part of the Gates Flying Circus, which he co-owned with Ivan Gates. It performed internationally and made Pangborn famous for changing planes mid-air. Early in his career, he was injured when he fell out of a speeding car as he attempted to jump onto a flying plane; this was his only serious injury during his entire career in flying. He received national fame after assisting in a mid-air rescue of stuntwoman Rosalie Gordon, who had become caught on Pangborn's landing gear while demonstrating a parachute jump, in Houston, Texas.

During his time in the Flying Circus, Pangborn flew more than 12,500 miles and carried thousands of passengers. It was during this time that he also met Hugh Herndon, who later became his co-pilot in a historic trans-Pacific flight.

Many who would later be major figures in aviation took their first flights with Pangborn, including future World War II ace Gregory Boyington, who took his first flight with Pangborn at the age of 8 during one of Pangborn's barnstorming stops.

The Flying Circus disbanded in 1929, but Pangborn continued flying with several other businesses he owned. The Great Depression, however, made them all go bankrupt, and as a result, he turned his attention to breaking world records in flight.

=== Failed attempt to circumnavigate globe ===
In 1931, Pangborn and Herndon sought to fly around the world and break the current record of 20 days and 4 hours, set by the airship Graf Zeppelin in 1929. Herndon, the son of Standard Oil heiress Alice Boardman, asked his mother for the $100,000 to finance the flight. However, while they were still planning their flight, the record was broken by Wiley Post and Harold Gatty with a time of 8 days and 15 hours. Pangborn and Herndon attempted the flight anyway, taking off from New York on July 28, 1931, in their red Bellanca J-300 Long Distance Special, the Miss Veedol, but poor weather conditions forced them to abandon their efforts while they were flying over Siberia. The pair took off just minutes after John Polando and Russell Boardman, who went on to successfully fly to Istanbul three days later.

=== 1931 trans-Pacific flight ===
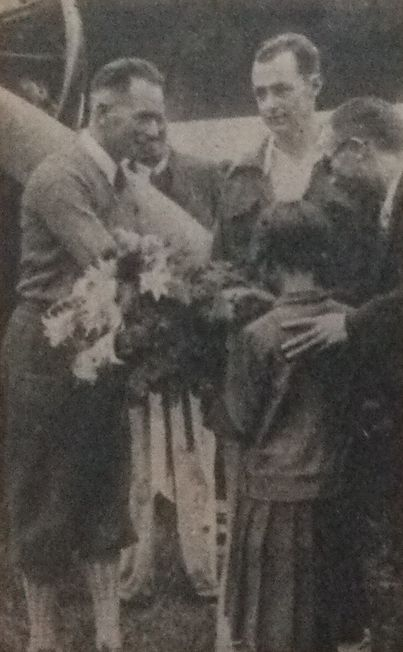
Pangborn and Herndon in Japan in 1931

With their eyes on a $25,000 prize, Pangborn and Herndon next decided to attempt the first nonstop trans-Pacific flight. They flew from Siberia to Japan in preparation. In the spirit of documentation, Herndon took several still pictures and 16 mm motion pictures, some of which were of Japan's naval installations. The photography and inadequate documentation to enter the country (which they had not been aware of), resulted in the men being jailed. They were eventually released with a $1,000 fine, but they were allowed only one chance to take off in Miss Veedol; if they returned to Japan, the plane would be confiscated and the men would return to prison.

Other complications hampered the flight. Pangborn and Herndon's "painstakingly prepared" maps and charts were stolen by the nationalist Black Dragon Society, who wanted a Japanese pilot flying Japanese equipment to be the first to complete the endeavor. They also had extremely precise calculations for their flight, leaving no room for error; Miss Veedol had to be overweighted with fuel, far beyond the manufacturer's recommendation (650 gallons stock was expanded to 915 gallons), and they would have to abandon their landing gear after takeoff to reduce drag.

Pangborn and Herndon finally took off on October 4, 1931, from Sabishiro Beach, Misawa, Aomori, Japan. Their destination was Seattle, Washington, just under 5500 miles (8,500 km) away, a distance exceeding Charles Lindbergh's flight from New York to Paris by 2,000 miles. Three hours after takeoff, a problem arose: the device intended to jettison the landing gear partially failed. The gear was ejected, but the two root struts remained. Pangborn had to climb out onto the wing supports barefoot at 14,000 feet to remove them.

Later, the engine nearly quit as Herndon neglected his responsibility to pump fuel from the fuselage tanks to the wing tanks, which feed the engine. Within a few hours, the upper tanks again went dry—this time the engine did quit running. Because there was no built-in starter, Pangborn dove the airplane from cruise altitude and pulled out at 1,400 ft (430 m) to get the engine started.

They almost ran into Mount Rainier when Vancouver, British Columbia, and Seattle were fogged in and Herndon again had the airplane off course. They decided to fly to Boise, where they could claim the furthest distance record along with the nonstop transpacific. Due to fog they could not land in Boise, Spokane, or Pasco, Washington, so they turned back to Wenatchee, Washington. They belly landed on a strip cut out of the sagebrush on Fancher Field near what is now East Wenatchee. Pangborn's mother, brother, and a reporter from the Japanese newspaper Asahi Shimbun had already assumed Wenatchee was their destination and were there waiting for their arrival. The flight from Japan took a total of 41 hours and 13 minutes.

The Pangborn-Herndon Memorial, dedicated to the historic flight, is located near the landing site, and the propeller damaged from the landing is on display in the Wenatchee Valley Museum and Cultural Center. The museum also has half of a sandwich believed to have been carried on the trans-Pacific flight. The regional airport, Pangborn Memorial (EAT) in East Wenatchee, also honors his accomplishment.

Miss Veedol was trucked to Seattle where she was repaired and the landing gear replaced. Pangborn and Herndon continued to New York to complete their world flight.

As early as 1935 Pangborn warned of a potential Japanese attack on the United States due to his sighting and analysis of Japanese aviation capabilities, and said that Japanese planes would be capable of reaching Chicago.

=== 1934 England-Australia race ===
In 1934, Pangborn, along with Col. Roscoe Turner, flew a Boeing 247 in the MacRobertson Race. Turner and Pangborn came in second place in the transport section (and third overall), behind the Boeing 247's eventual rival, the new Douglas DC-2.

=== 1936 Moscow flight ===
In 1936 the Vance Flying Wing was bought at auction in 1936 for $2,500 by the Mason Aircraft Corporation. Pangborn planned on using the aircraft for a Dallas, Texas, to Moscow Flight. Pangborn was detained near the Latvian frontier when he entered the country without a visa. He was released on July 21, 1937, and flew on to Moscow after help from New York Congressman William Sirovich.

== Later career ==
Prior to World War II, he had become the Chief Test Pilot for Bellanca Aircraft Corporation in New Castle, Delaware. In 1937, he demonstrated Burnelli Aircraft in England and Europe for Cunliffe-Owen Aircraft Company of Southampton, England. He worked for Cunliffe-Owen until the late 1930s testing military aircraft.

When World War II broke out in Europe in late 1939, Pangborn joined the Royal Air Force (RAF) and assisted in organizing the RAF Ferry Command. He recruited pilots throughout the United States and Canada for the Ferry Command and Eagle Squadron. From 1941 through the end of the war in 1945, Pangborn served as Senior Captain, Royal Air Force Ferry Command during which time he made approximately 170 trans-ocean flights (crossing both the Atlantic and the Pacific). In 1942, he brought the first Lancaster heavy bomber to the United States for tests and later returned with the same aircraft and demonstrated it to the United States Army Air Forces and major aircraft builders throughout the United States and Canada. Meanwhile, Pangborn flew almost every type of multi-engine aircraft used during the war. After the US entered the war in December 1941, he served in the US military.

He was discharged from the RAF in 1946 and continued his career as a commercial pilot. As part of his work, he pioneered commercial flight paths and developed better aircraft. He was instrument-rated to fly any plane, single or multi-engine, land or sea, and had logged more than 24,000 flight hours over his 40 years of piloting.

Pangborn died in 1958 and was laid to rest with military honors at Arlington National Cemetery. His papers are archived at Washington State University. and the Museum of Flight in Seattle.

Pangborn was enshrined as a member of the National Aviation Hall of Fame in 1995.

== See also ==
- Adventurers' Club of New York
