= Dayton-Wright OW.1 Aerial Coupe =

OW.1 Aerial Coupe
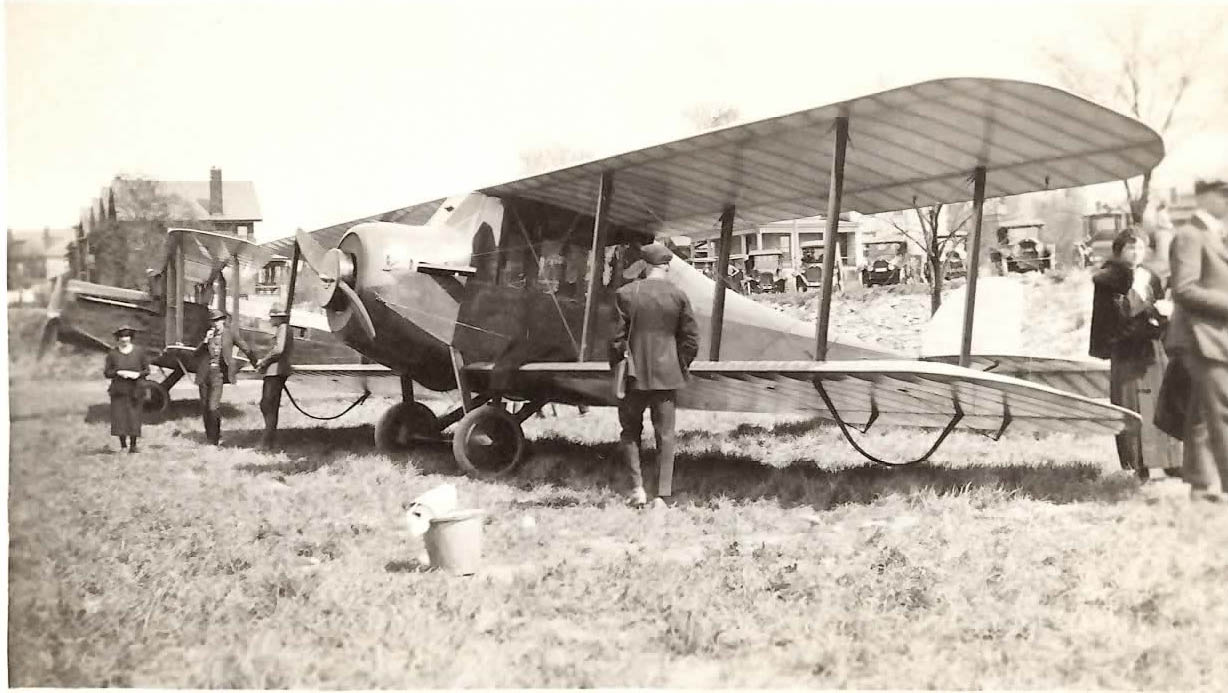
- United States Air Force Photo

General information
- Type: three-seat touring aircraft
- Manufacturer: Dayton-Wright Company
- Number built: 1

History
- Manufactured: 1919
- First flight: 1919
- Developed into: California Coupe

The Dayton-Wright OW.1 Aerial Coupe was an American four-seat touring aircraft built by the Dayton-Wright Company of Dayton, Ohio. Because it was the last aircraft designed by Orville Wright, the design was given the designation OW.1. The aircraft was based on a heavily modified De Havilland DH.4. Although only one was produced, the Dayton-Wright OW.1 marks the first working example of a civilian single-engine four passenger light cabin aircraft in the US. The interior was designed for greater comfort compared to contemporaries, and was meant to be more like an automobile interior. It had a side-opening door with two rows of two seats, and a greater focus on luxury.

It set an altitude record of 19,710 ft (6,010 m) on 22 May 1921. In 1924 it was crashed in an air race, which marked the last time it flew and it was sold for parts. It turned out to be the last aircraft designed in part by one of the Wright brothers.

== Design and development ==
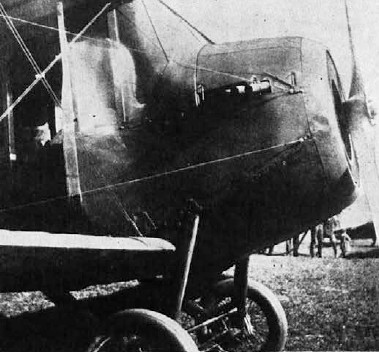
Dayton-Wright OW.1 Aerial Coupe

Following up on a wartime contract to build the British DH.4 under license, the Dayton-Wright Company looked at development of the type for civil use. One version was designed by Orville Wright. Designated the OW.1 Aerial Coupe (OW standing for Orville Wright), it was the last aircraft designed by one of the Wright brothers. Although based on the DH-4, it had lighter-weight wings, revised landing gear, and a shortened, smaller tail unit. The main difference was a new widened fuselage featuring an enclosed cabin. Initially designed for a forward pilot, with two passengers seated behind, the cabin was later modified to accommodate three passengers.

== Operational history ==
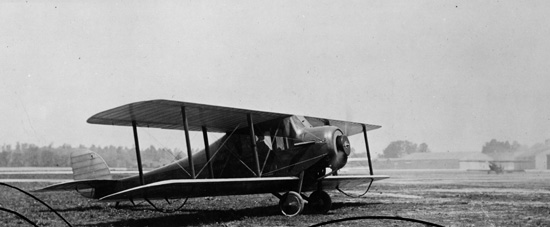
Dayton Wright OW.1 at McCook Field

The Dayton-Wright OW.1 was refitted with a 150 hp (110 kW) Packard 8, and later equipped with a 180 hp (130 kW) Wright-Hisso E inline engine. The OW.1 set an altitude record of 19,710 ft (6,010 m) on 22 May 1921, flown by Dayton-Wright test pilot Bernard L. Whelan, and accompanied by three mechanics as passengers. The Aerial Coupe reached the record altitude after a 2 hr, 31 min flight over USAAC Test Center at McCook Field in Dayton, Ohio.

The aircraft was used for a publicity stunt, delivering ice cream for the Retail Ice Cream Dealers' Association banquet.

Whelan and Howard Rinehart (another company test pilot) set up the Rinehart-Whelan Company at Moraine City, Ohio, and acquired the Aerial Coupe in 1923. They planned to market the OW.1 along with other Dayton-Wright designs, but Rinehart crashed the OW.1 in an air race.

A year later, John Montijo, a former Army instructor from Long Beach, California purchased the remains of the crashed OW.1, and used parts from it to rebuild an aircraft called the California Coupe, powered by a Hall-Scott L-6.

== Specifications (OW.1) ==
Data from The Illustrated Encyclopedia of Aircraft

General characteristics

- Crew: One pilot
- Capacity: 3 passengers
- Length: 28 ft 6 in (8.69 m)
- Wingspan: 46 ft 0 in (14.02 m)
- Height: 9 ft 0 in (2.74 m)
- Wing area: 534 sq ft (49.6 m^{2})
- Empty weight: 1,450 lb (658 kg)
- Gross weight: 2,492 lb (1,130 kg)
- Powerplant: 1 × Wright-Hisso E V-8 water-cooled piston engine , 180 hp (134 kW)

Performance

- Maximum speed: 95 mph (153 km/h, 83 kn)
- Range: 500 mi (800 km, 430 nmi)
- Service ceiling: 19,700 ft (6,010 m)

== See also ==
Aircraft of comparable role, configuration, and era

- California Coupe
