= Vance Viking =

Viking
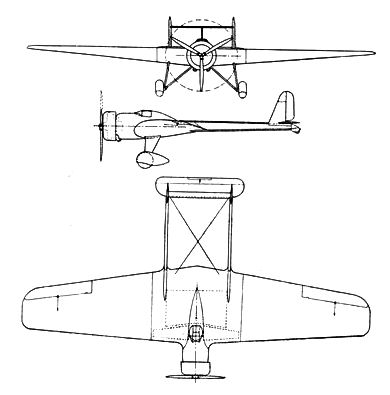
- Vance Viking 3-view drawing from L'Aerophile February 1933

General information
- Type: Racing aircraft
- National origin: United States of America
- Manufacturer: Vance Aircraft Company
- Designer: Claire K. Vance

History
- First flight: July 1932

The Vance Viking, also called the Vance Flying Wing Express, and the Texas Sky Ranger, was a single seat cargo and racing aircraft.

== Design and development ==
Claire K. Vance founded the Vance Aircraft Corporation to build the "Flying Wing" design. The aircraft was designed though a series of hand-carved wooden models before drawings were made, with the intention of it being a high speed, high altitude air-freighter with storage in thick wing lockers. Its short air racing history was interrupted by the 1932 death of its designer Claire Vance who struck a fog-covered mountain at Rocky Ridge.

The "Flying Wing" was a conventional long-range aircraft for the period with the exception of the two large booms aft of the cockpit supporting the twin tail surfaces and twin rudders, rather than a conventional fuselage. The tandem seat aircraft was converted to a single pilot aircraft that featured a radial engine and conventional landing gear (one tailwheel for each boom). Fourteen fuel tanks totaling 1,200 U.S. gallons (4,500 L; 1,000 imp gal) were interconnected inside the cantilevered mid-wing. The aircraft was of mixed construction, with an aluminum-covered welded steel tube fuselage. The wing used wooden wing spars with plywood covering. A forced air induction system was built into the wing roots with exhausts mounted near the trailing edges.

== Operational history ==
In 1932 the Viking dropped out of the Bendix Trophy race following fuel system issues. In 1933 it was entered, but did not compete in the Bendix Trophy race.

In 1934 Lt. Murray B. Dilley purchased the aircraft and production rights from Claire Vance's estate for $10,000 with the intention of racing the aircraft in the 1934 England-Australia MacRobertson Air Race. Dilley only paid $2500 of the amount owed, and abandoned the aircraft in the desert near Palm Springs, California. The Flying Wing was bought at auction in 1936 for $2500 by the Mason Aircraft Corporation. Clyde Pangborn planned on using the aircraft for a Dallas, Texas to Moscow Flight. Later the aircraft was returned to tandem configuration, a radio compass was installed, it was re-painted red and white and christened "The Texas Sky Ranger". Roland W. Richards sponsored the aircraft as part of a publicity campaign for the Texas Centennial Exposition to fly to New York, Paris, visit London, Amsterdam, Madrid, and Brussels and then return on a non-stop Paris to Dallas flight with Pangborn and Mony Mason as pilots. Mason backed out by not meeting a commitment, but the flight was planned to continue independently with Pangborn with newspaper sponsorship.

== Specifications (Vance Viking) ==
Data from Flight

General characteristics

- Crew: 1
- Wingspan: 60 ft (18 m)
- Fuel capacity: 1,200 U.S. gallons (4,500 L; 1,000 imp gal)
- Powerplant: 1 × Pratt & Whitney Wasp Radial, 660 hp (490 kW)
- Propellers: 2-bladed Hamilton Standard

Performance

- Maximum speed: 170 kn (200 mph, 320 km/h)
- Cruise speed: 140 kn (160 mph, 260 km/h)
- Range: 6,500 nmi (7,500 mi, 12,100 km)
- Service ceiling: 35,000 ft (11,000 m)

Avionics

- Automatic Pilot

== See also ==
Aircraft of comparable role, configuration, and era

- Emsco B-8 Flying Wing
