= Rancho Guadalasca =

Mexican land grant in Ventura County, California

Coordinates: 34.160°N 118.990°W

Rancho Guadalasca was a 30,594-acre (123.81 km^{2}) Mexican land grant in present-day Ventura County, California, given in 1836 by Governor Mariano Chico to Ysabel Yorba. The grant was in the southern part of the county, bordering on Los Angeles County. The grant extended along the Pacific coast near Point Mugu for about eight miles and extended into the interior along Guadalasca Creek in the Santa Monica Mountains for about ten miles.

This rancho lies in the extreme southern part of Ventura, southeast of the colonia. It borders Los Angeles County about two miles, on the coast about eight miles, and extends about ten miles into the interior. The place is historical, being the site of Xucu or "The Town of the Canoes," described in the voyage of Cabrillo, 300 years ago, and having been the most densely populated portion of the coast.

One of the valleys, La Jolla, seems to have been a favorite ground of the Indians, being rich in kitchen middens, bones, etc., and having a trail, worn deep, from the landing over the hill. The Guadalasca was a grant of 30,593.85 acres, made on May 6, 1846, to Ysabel Yorba, whose title was confirmed by the United States Land Commissioners. Of the estate, 23,000 acres were later purchased by William Richard Broome, an English gentleman of leisure living in Santa Barbara.

Several thousand of these acres are on the fertile Colonia plain, where flowing wells of artesian water can be had at 100 to 150 feet deep. "The Estero" is the termination of the Guadalasca Creek, being a basin some four miles long, in some parts 1,000 feet wide, and deep enough to float large vessels. Near Point Mugu there is a landing for vessels, safe in any weather, and considered one of the best harbors on the coast.

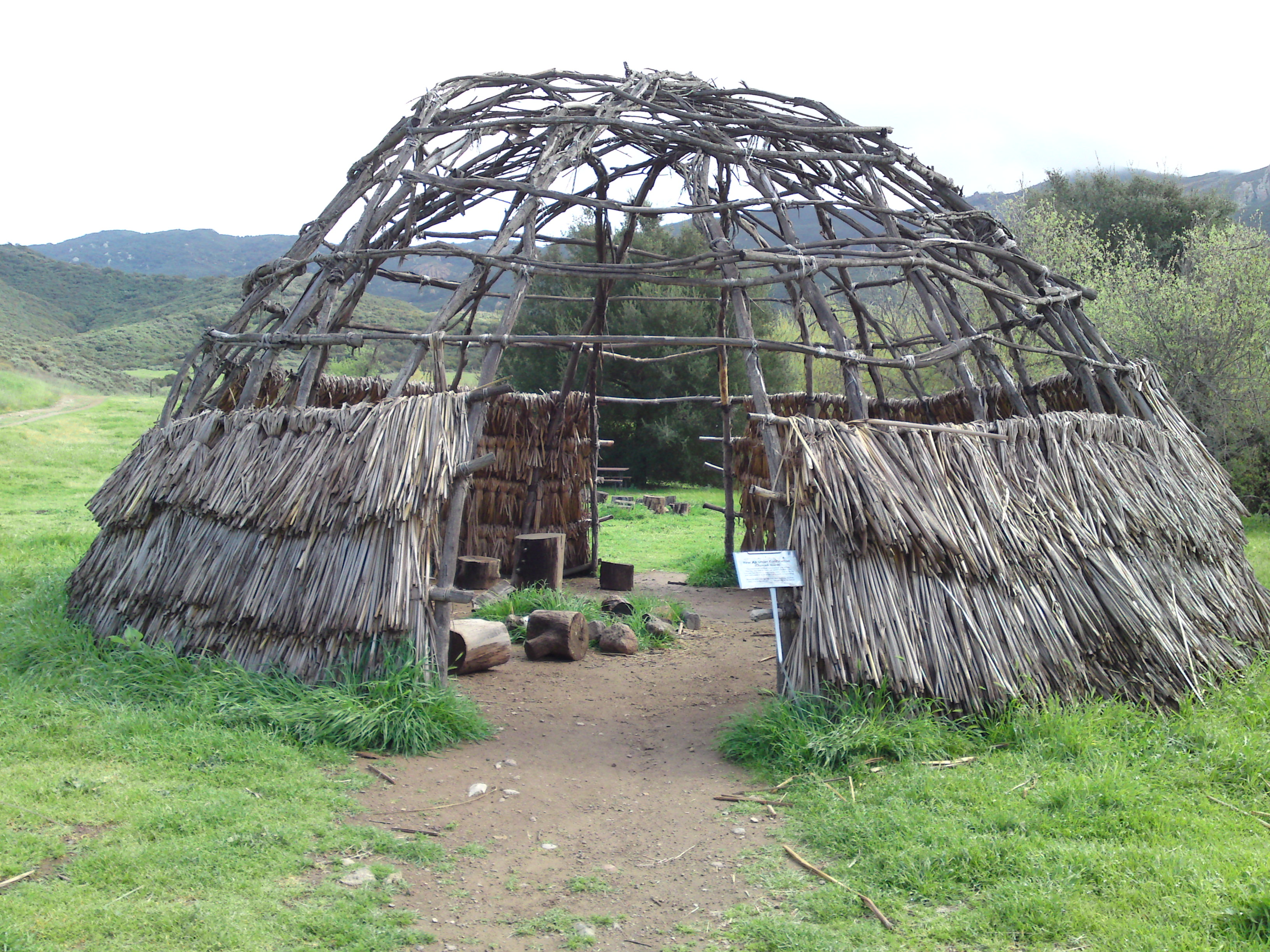
A reconstructed Chumash house on land once belonging to Rancho Guadalasca.

== Prehistory ==
Long before this land was claimed as a rancho or national park, it was occupied by the Chumash people. They lived, raised families, and developed communities for over 9,000 years on this land. The Chumash lived primarily in small seasonal camps. One of these villages, located on Rancho Guadalasca, was called Satwiwa, which translates to “bluff”. The topography of this part of the ranch allowed it to be a main trade route for the Chumash Indians.

The rancho’s wide canyon provided access to Satwiwa village for commerce, an important part of Chumash society. The Chumash had developed an economic system based on monetary beads and shells brought from the Channel Islands that were traded with other villages. Another instrument that was important to the Chumash advances in trade was the “Tomol” or canoe that was used for ocean travel.

Trade and commerce were also motivated by each distinct area and the particular unique items each could offer for trade. Coastal villages would trade seafood and shells with inland villages for game and obsidian, using the trade route that ran through the rancho. Rancho Guadalasca has been an important part of commerce and community for thousands of years.

== Transition into Spanish territory ==
The Native American populations enjoyed little interference from white men until the Missions were established. The Mission Period was the establishment of twenty-one missions between 1769 and 1823. These missions were located about a day’s ride from one another along the major route, the Camino Real, that connected San Diego with Solano. The Spanish went on several expeditions, acquiring land.

Native Americans were slowly assimilated into the Mission system and were moved from their villages and the islands to missions. It was during this period that diseases were introduced that began decimating the Indian populations. Following the decline of the Mission system and during the Mexican Period, enormous land grants were given to army veterans. [Which were unorganized and without set boundaries.] Under Mexican law, most early land grants in the general area became ranchos, including Ranchos: El Conejo, Guadalasca, Calleguas, Las Posas, Santa Clara Del Norte, and El Rio de Santa Clara o La Colonia.

Rancho Guadalasca, a 30,594-acre land grant, was vacant and uncultivated until Ysabel Yorba filed for ownership of the land in 1836.

The name Guadalasca is probably from shuwalaxsho, the name of a Ventureño Chumash village. The xsho element may mean "sycamore". The spelling is also perhaps influenced by other Spanish names beginning with Guada- (from Arabic وادي wādī "valley"), e.g. Guadalajara, Guadalquivir, Guadalupe.

== Ysabel Yorba ==
Ysabel Yorba (1789–1871) (the daughter of José Antonio Yorba a European immigrant from Catalonia, and his second wife, Maria Josefa Grijalva, an Espanola,) was born in San Diego. She married Jose Joaquin Maitorena in 1805 while he was still a cadet in the Spanish army. Maitorena reached the rank of lieutenant in 1827 and was stationed at the Presidio of Santa Barbara. Maitorena was sent to Mexico as a member of Congress for 1829–30 and died there of apoplexy.

After his death, the newly widowed Yorba petitioned the governor for a land grant based on Maitorena's military service, citing the justification: “That being the owner of 500 head of cattle, and 40 head of broken horses, and some mares, and having no place for said stock…” On the 5 July 1836 then Governor, Chico, granted Rancho Guadalasca to Ysabel Yorba excluding land described as the lagoon and plain owing to the acting Mission's need for those lands.

The next year guardianship of the mission changed hands from Father Ordaz to a new leader who believed the lagoon and plain as unrequired and open for purchase. Yorba applied to acquire the land soon after this and was granted the additional area to enlarge the total size of the Rancho to 30,573 acres. By 1837 she built a palizada house and an adobe house the year after that. The locations of the houses have yet to be found but, their existence is documented. Statistical records from an 1860 document list Yorba as having 925 head of cattle valued at $22,000 and approximately 70 horses.

She adopted Isabel Lugo and four other children after she received her 1836 land grant, then added Josefina Bonilla and Isabel "Jennie" Dominguez later. Before her death at age 82, Ysabel Yorba sold her Rancho for $28,000 in US gold coin, while her large estate was left to her four adopted daughters. Yorba was illiterate yet operated Rancho Guadalasca from Santa Barbara. J.N. Bowman referred to her as one of the prominent women of early California history.

== 19th- through 21st-century history ==
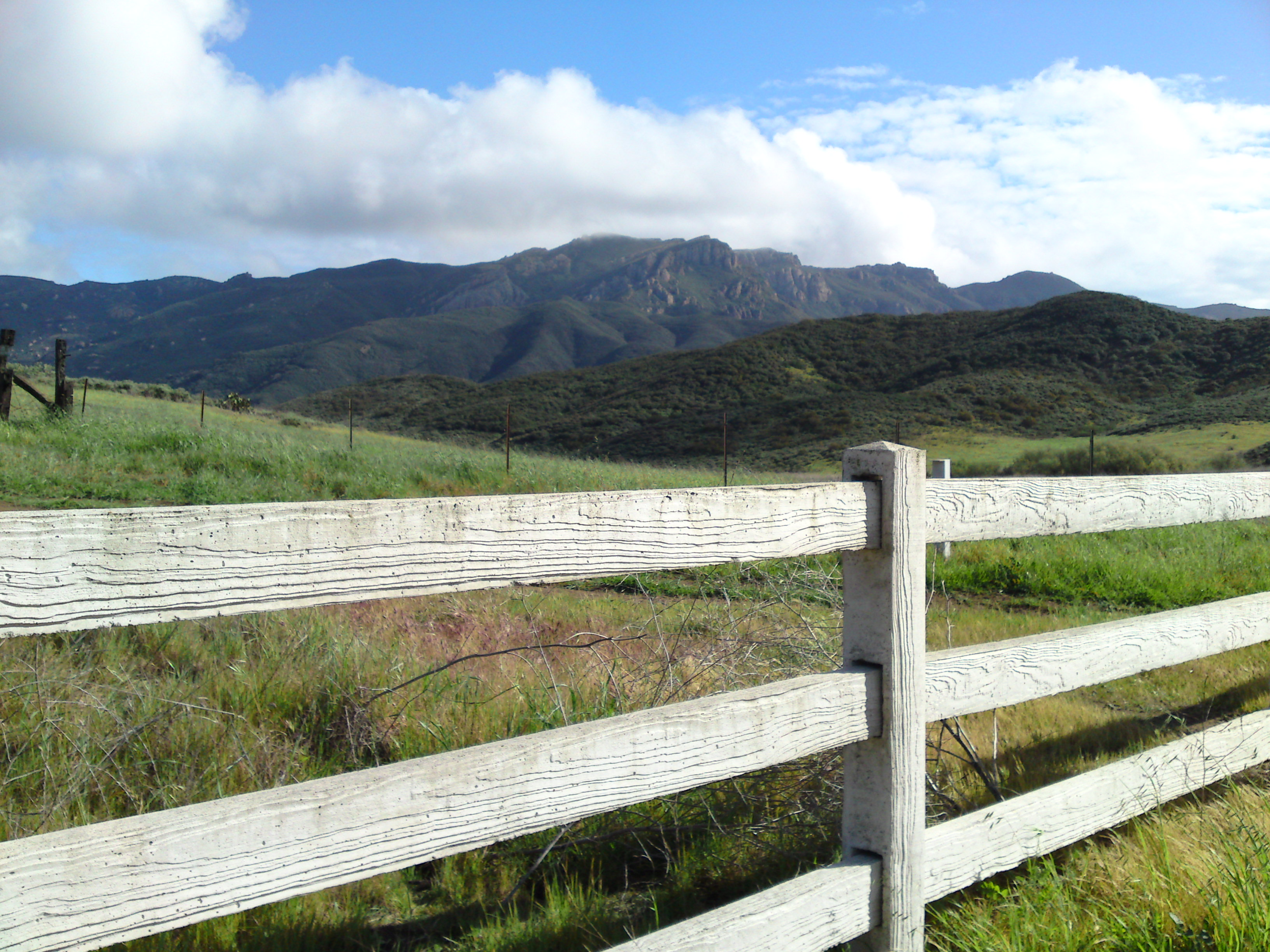
Large areas of land that were once Rancho Guadalasca remains virtually intact today due to protection from the California State Parks and the National Park Service

With the cession of California to the United States following the Mexican-American War, as required by the Land Act of 1851, a claim for Rancho Guadalasca was filed with the Public Land Commission in 1852, and the grant was patented to Ysabel Yorba in 1873.

By the 1870s Rancho owners and their heirs and descendants came under pressure to sell or relinquish their land holdings to new immigrants. Selling of the land was prevalent in the late Rancho period due to the Hispanic pattern of living in town and taking care of the rancho from afar, which was quite common on California land at that time.

The practice of distance maintenance made it desirable for Rancho heirs to sell off their lands to newcomers and prospectors willing to pay in gold coins. Breaking up the Ranchos in the late 19th century became a slow process; however, that could take twenty or more years to confirm land grants. The slow process and lawyer fees put pressure on landholders to give up on their land grants and created a land boom, which would, in turn, lead to a population increase and result in the breakup of Ventura and Santa Barbara County in 1873. Upon the breakup of the counties, Rancho El Conejo, along with Guadalasca, were sold off and parceled out to investors.

These first investors would soon re-sell their land and it was not uncommon to have land owners that were the fourth party in the succession of title for lands once known as Rancho Guadalasca. These local developments created opportunities for future prospectors like William Richard Broome to purchase Rancho Guadalasca land back in the 1870s. The first sale of Rancho Guadalasca, however, was to land investors such as the J.M. Dickerson group made up of Thomas and John Dickerson in addition to John Funk. A small coastal property of 8 acres along Mugu Lagoon was also owned by the partners Goodall and Nelson who owned their own coastal steamship line, one of the first for the area.

A 23,000-acre (93 km^{2}) southern part of the rancho was purchased in 1871 by William Richard Broome (d.1891), an Englishman living in Santa Barbara.

A tenant rancher, L.J. Rose, tells of how he leased 2,300 acres of land on the Guadalasca Ranch from William Broome for five years in the late 1800s. During this time, Mr. Rose sued Mr. Broome’s wife, who was managing the land, for losses of $45,000 due to a Texas fever tick epidemic that devastated his herd of cattle. He was awarded $11,000.

Frances' obit, Oxnard Daily Courier, 10 Nov. 1921

Upon the death of William Richard Broome, he attempted to entail the property by his will, and the great rancho has been held for many years by Mrs. Frances Broome, the widow, to the exclusion of the three children. About the year 1910, Thornhill Francis Broome instituted proceedings in the Superior Court of Santa Barbara county to remove his mother as executrix and trustee of the estate. After a long legal battle, he was successful in his contention, and Judge S.E. Crow declared the provisions of Lord Broome’s will to be invalid, creating a trust not known to the laws of California. Judge Crow distributed Rancho Guadalasca one-third to Mrs. Frances Broome, the widow, and two-ninths each to the three children.

An 8,200-acre (33 km^{2}) northern part was purchased by Joseph F. Lewis in 1906. Lewis was a business associate of Adolfo Camarillo. In 1932, the State of California purchased 1,760 acres (7.1 km^{2}) of the Lewis ranch for $415,000 and established the Camarillo State Mental Hospital. In 2002, the state hospital was renovated and transformed into California State University, Channel Islands. The university library was funded in large by John "Jack" Spoor Broome (1918–2009), the grandson of William Richard Broome.

John S. Broome took over management of the family citrus produce business, Rancho Guadalasca, in 1946. At the time of his death, he owned approximately 3,000 acres of the original 23,000. In addition to the $5,000,000 donation for the CSUCI library (one of the largest donations in Ventura County history), Mr. Broome also helped launch Casa Pacifica, a home for abused, neglected, and emotionally disturbed children, also within the Rancho Guadalasca region.

The name Guadalasca survives today on the property of Pt. Mugu State Park, where a popular biking and walking trail, is named after Ysabel Yorba's original Rancho and is sometimes referred to as Guadalasco.

== Present day ==
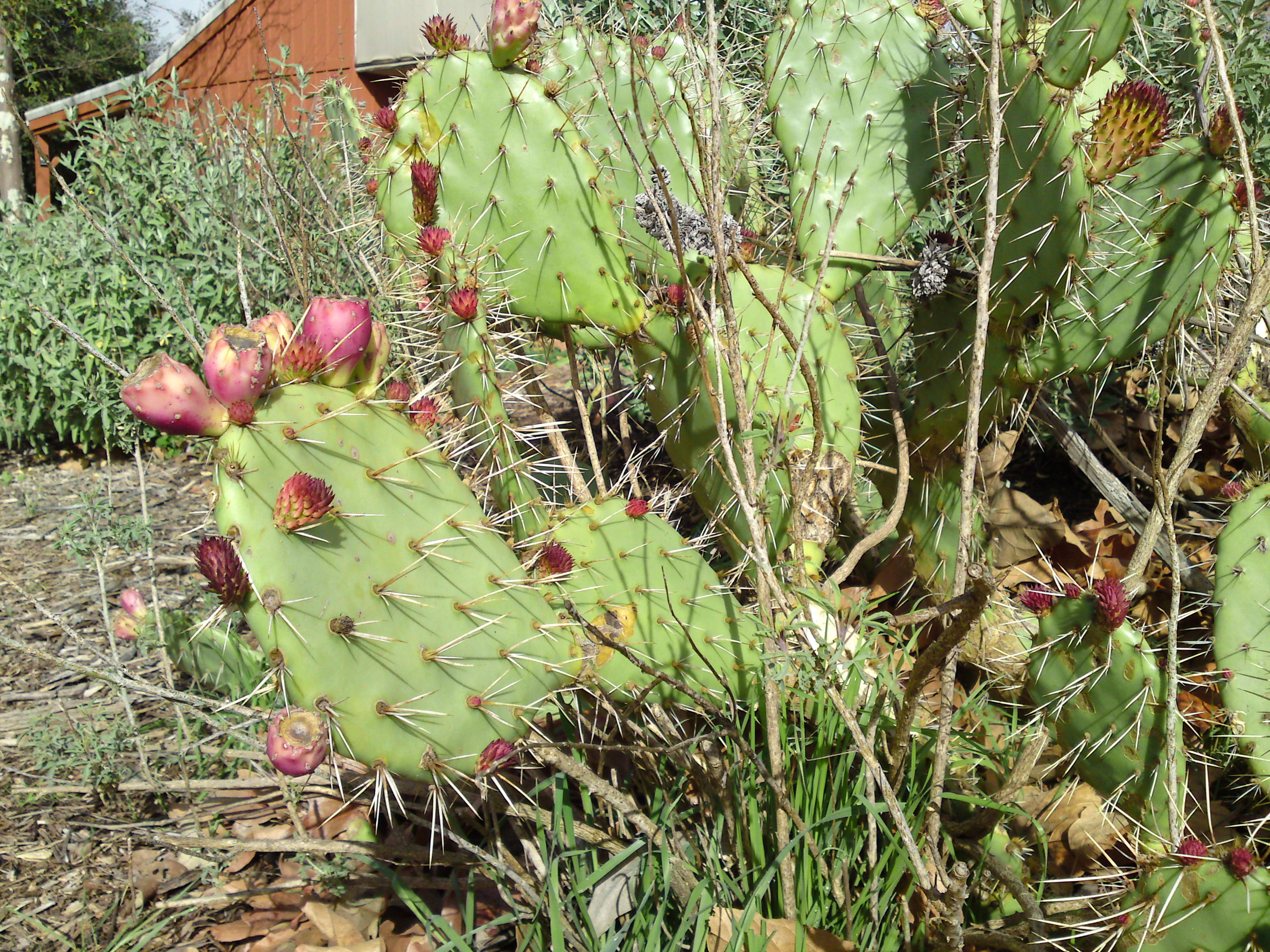
Opuntia Litoralis, the Coast Prickly Pear, which dotted the landscape of Rancho Guadalasca and still exists there today

The land that was once Rancho Guadalasca is now the site of various landmarks and attractions. Point Mugu State Park, also known to locals as Sycamore Canyon, is located in the Santa Monica Mountains National Recreation Area. It features more than 70 miles of hiking trails and five miles of pristine ocean shoreline surrounded by the rocky bluffs and jagged pinnacles of the Boney Mountains State Wilderness Area.

== Wildlife ==
The mountains are home to many kinds of wildlife, including bears, deer, California lions, wild cats, and coyotes. At the same time, the sea is rich in fish and shellfish, which formerly supported the dense aboriginal population.
