= Order of Daedalians =

Fraternal order of US military pilots

- Formation: 1934; 92 years ago
- Founder: Harold George
- Purpose: Aviation advocacy
- Location: Joint Base San Antonio, Texas, USA
- Chairman of the Board: Douglas H. Owens
- Website: daedalians.org

The Order of Daedalians is a fraternal and professional order of American military pilots. The namesake of the order is Daedalus who according to Greek mythology was the first person to achieve heavier-than-air flight.

== History ==
The idea of a fraternal organization for World War I aviators was first expressed by Brig. Gen. Billy Mitchell. His stated purpose of the order was to "... perpetuate the spirit of patriotism, the love of country, the memories, sad and pleasant, of our service during that period (World War I) and to further cement the ties of comradeship which bound us together in that critical hour of our nation's need....". Lt. Harold George was in the audience to hear Gen. Mitchell speak, and helped to formally organize the Order of Daedalians 13 years later, on March 26, 1934, at Maxwell Field in Alabama. The headquarters of the Order moved to Kelly AFB, Texas, in 1954. The current national headquarters is at Joint Base San Antonio (formerly Randolph AFB), Texas.

== Membership ==
Virtually all of the more than 14,000 American World War I aviators who were commissioned officers and rated as military pilots no later than the Armistice, on November 11, 1918, have Founder Memberships in the Order, even though some did not participate in the Order during their lifetimes. At first, active membership was open only to Founder Members and their descendants, called Hereditary Members. Membership was further divided into two categories: Active, for commissioned officers, and Associate, for those who met membership requirements, but were not commissioned in the Regular Army.

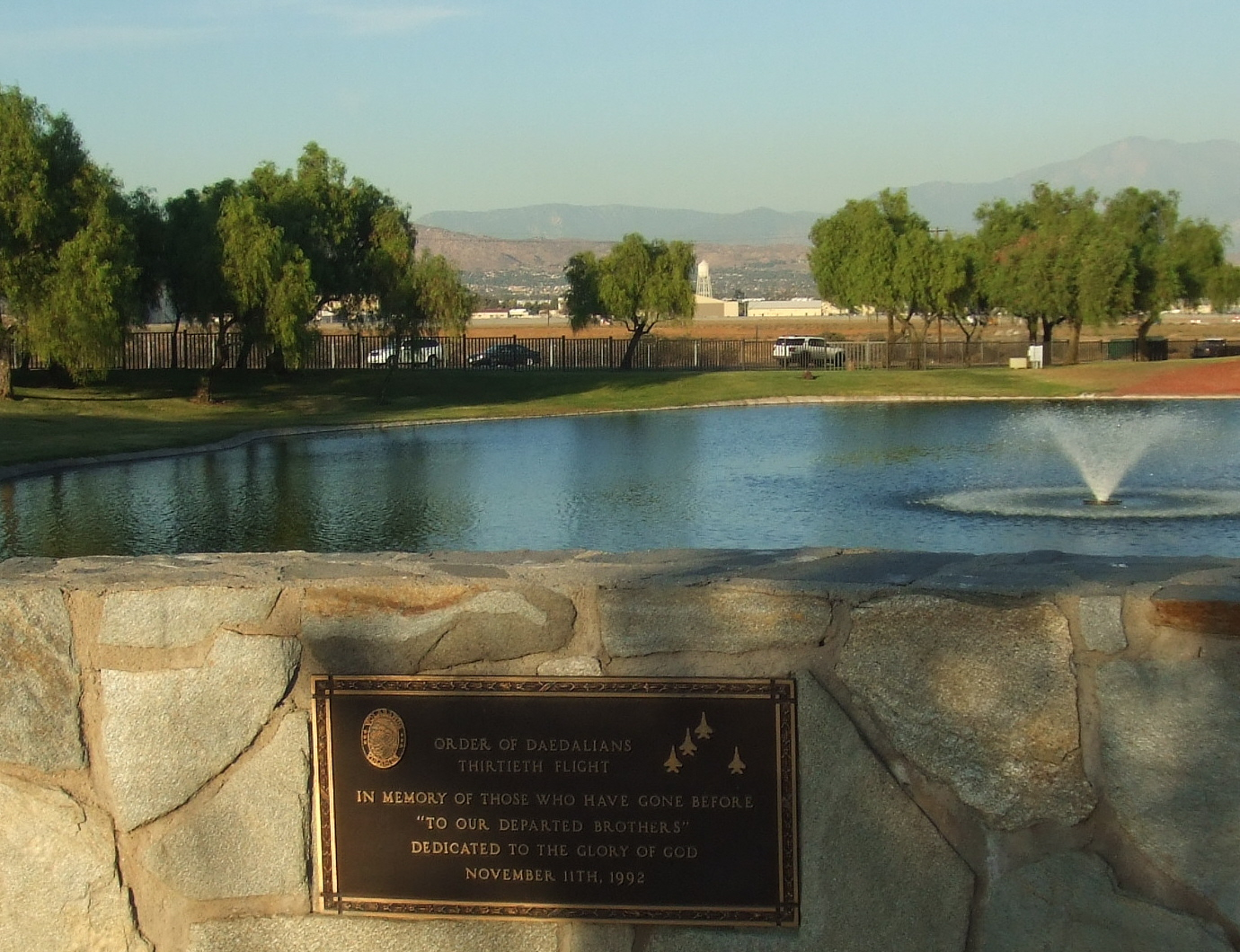
Plaque honoring the Order of Daedalians at the Riverside National Cemetery, in Riverside, California, with March Joint Air Reserve Base in background.

In the early 1950s, the Order created Named Memberships for current or former military pilots of heavier-than-air powered aircraft. This expansion ensured a new source of members for the Order. Later changes allowed female commissioned pilots to join. In 2001 membership criteria were changed to authorize memberships for ex-commissioned officers, whether or not they retired, and for all Flight officers and warrant officers who held ratings as military pilots of heavier-than-air powered aircraft. In 2002 membership criteria were again changed to authorize memberships for WASPs.

Currently, there are three categories of membership:

- Founder Members, who no later than November 11, 1918 were commissioned officers and rated as pilots of heavier-than-air aircraft in any branch of the armed forces;
- Named Members, current and former military pilots of heavier-than-air craft, to perpetuate Founder memberships; and
- Hereditary Members, descendants of Founder Members.

Up to 15 Honorary Members may be named for exceptional reasons.

A qualified applicant interested in membership must be nominated by an active Daedalian, and endorsed by three other active Daedalians. The application must then be sent to national headquarters for approval. Individual chapters are called Flights.

The Order established the Daedalian Foundation in 1959 to conduct educational, scientific and charitable activities in support of the Order's Tenets and Objectives. The Foundation is an IRS tax-exempt 501(C)(3) organization that relies on contributions, donations and bequests from the Daedalian membership to fund a comprehensive and varied scholarship program, administered through the 39th Flight Eagle Wing. The Foundation also publishes the Daedalus Flyer, the Order's official publication and newsletter.

== Awards ==
There are 18 Daedalian Awards. In 1970, the Daedalian Weapon System Award was presented for the first time by Colonel Franklin C. Wolfe, who from 1939 until 1944 served as assistant chief and chief of the Armament Laboratory of the Army Air Forces Materiel Command at Wright Field.

The Order of Daedalians presents two annual awards, the Exceptional Aviator Award and the Brigadier General Carl I. Hutton Memorial Award. Nominations for the Exceptional Aviator Award is open to Army rated military aviators, and for the BG Carl I. Hutton Memorial Award is open to all Army aviation units no matter the size.

== See also ==
- Quiet Birdmen
