= Mason Aircraft Company =

American aircraft manufacturer

- Industry: Aircraft Modification and Manufacturer

Mason Aircraft Company was an American aircraft manufacturer of the late 1920s and 1930s.

Mason Aircraft Company was founded by Monty G. Mason of Los Angeles, California. Mason modified a 1928 custom aircraft built by students of the California Polytechnic State University into an aerial broadcasting booth for NBC with the call sign KHRCX. The aircraft was also equipped with fuel tanks for a 1934 non-stop aerial refueling record attempt. On 29 April 1934, the aircraft crashed in a landing accident at Long Beach, California

In 1936, Mason Aircraft bought the Vance Flying Wing at Auction for $2500. Monty Mason and Clyde Pangborn planned on using the aircraft for a Dallas, Texas to Moscow Flight.

== Aircraft ==
Summary of aircraft built by
Model name	First flight	Number built	Type
Mason Greater Meteor	1933	1	Aerial Broadcasting Aircraft
