= Dean Ivan Lamb =

American pioneer aviator and mercenary

Dean Ivan Lamb (January 25, 1886 – November 1955) was an American pioneer aviator and mercenary.

== Biography ==
Dean Ivan Lamb was born on January 25, 1886, in Cherry Flats, Tioga County, Pennsylvania. In 1908 he was working on the Panama Canal

He enrolled in the Curtiss Flying School in Hammondsport, New York, in 1912. During the Mexican Revolution, according to a Lamb newspaper interview, he was hired as a mercenary pilot to fly for General Benjamín G. Hill's forces. Phil Rader, a mercenary pilot for opposing General Victoriano Huerta, had supposedly several times bombed the town of Naco, Sonora, Mexico, held by Hill's forces. The two pilots were reputed friends, and staged a mock pistol battle in the sky often labeled the first dogfight in history.

Lamb purportedly joined the British military in World War I and transferred to the Royal Flying Corps as a sergeant pilot, supposedly becoming an ace with either five or eight victories. Lamb was interviewed by Arthur Howden Smith of the New York Evening Post about his claimed downing of a German Gotha bomber over Hainault Forest, in which his gunner was killed and he himself was shot. However, he goes unnoted by such aviation historians as Norman Franks and Christopher Shores, and none of his victories have ever been documented. Lamb supposedly was awarded Royal Aero Club Certificate No. 4543 on April 26, 1917, while an Air Mechanic, 1st Class. There are records of a Sgt. Dean Lamb (service number 8054) who joined the Royal Flying Corps on August 30, 1915, and was discharged on October 5, 1917. This man is listed as suffering from neurasthenia, and his age is given as 31 years, 8 months (which agrees with Lamb's age on the specified discharge date). Lamb married in England in 1917.

Postwar, Lamb worked as an airmail pilot in New York, New Jersey and Maryland from December 9, 1918, to February 6, 1919.

Lamb helped to establish the Honduran Air Force in 1921.

According to Lamb in another newspaper interview, while in Buenos Aires, he was hired as the "commander of the federal air squadron of 11 planes" in a civil war underway in Paraguay. According to Who's Who in Aviation, Lamb commanded the Paraguayan air force from 1922 to 1923. As Lamb related the tale, it turned out the rebels were also recruiting in the same city at the same time. An Italian friend named Mazzolini was selected to lead "the revolutionists' air squadron". The two got together, rounded up unemployed World War I veteran pilots in the city, and split them up, with Lamb first choosing two, then Mazzolini one (as the rebels had only six aircraft). The two groups then set out for Paraguay on the same train, carousing together all the way.

In that same interview, Lamb claimed that on one day, he and a loyalist colonel observed a dogfight over their airdrome. The non-flying colonel was impressed when the rebel plane went into a spin and "disappeared over the skyline", with federalist mercenary "Stewart on its tail, firing steadily." The colonel sent a case of champagne to celebrate the victory. When Lamb took Stewart aside to scold him, however, Stewart informed him that, like Lamb's own dogfight in Mexico, it was all a sham. By the time the rebels were defeated, Lamb's squadron had claimed 48 victories over the six enemy aircraft.

On December 1, 1944, Lamb was jailed, accused of stealing either $19,000 or $38,000 worth of jewels. He denied the grand larceny charge and was released on $5,000 bail. According to an Early Birds of Aviation article, he was cleared of the charge in May 1945.

A declassified memo dated April 15, 1949, from "John Edgar Hoover" to the Director of Intelligence, General Staff, Department of the Army, The Pentagon, reports that "Colonel Dean Ivan Lamb" was "recently interviewed" at the Federal Bureau of Investigation's New York office. In the interview, Lamb was asked about his information-gathering work for Alger Hiss (accused in 1948 of spying for the Soviet Union) in 1933. Lamb claimed he reported his activity to "Colonel Thiele of G-2 in Washington, D. C. in about March 1934." The memo requests any records of this notification and the "present whereabouts of Colonel Thiele in order that he may be interviewed in connection with these allegations."

He died in Tucson, Arizona, in November 1955, by suicide.

== Legacy ==
Lamb was a member of the Quiet Birdmen and the Early Birds of Aviation.

Lamb wrote a book about his alleged exploits, The Incurable Filibuster. Adventures of Colonel Dean Ivan Lamb (Farrar & Rinehart, 1934). It was ghostwritten by John Eoghan Kelly.
