= Warren CP-2 =

CP-2

General information
- Type: Biplane
- National origin: United States
- Manufacturer: California Polytechnic College
- Designer: B.O. Brundy H.M. Cole
- Status: destroyed 1941

History
- First flight: 1931
- Developed from: Arrow Sport

The Warren CP-2, also called the Warren Taperwing, or the Kinner Taperwing was the third and last aircraft built by engineering students at California Polytechnic College in the 1930s

== Design ==
The aircraft is a side-by-side open cockpit biplane with conventional landing gear, powered by a Kinner K-5 radial engine. The wings used wooden spars and ribs with fabric covering. The fuel tank is mounted against the firewall. The fuselage was acquired from the liquidation of Arrow Aircraft in Lincoln, Nebraska.

== Operational history ==
The aircraft was registered in the experimental category and several attempts were made to register it in the restricted category for aerial photography. New owner Clifford Bryant flew the aircraft from Fresno, California until a partial motor mount failure caused the engine to nearly fall off in flight. The aircraft was sold to Madonna Inn partner Arthur Madonna, and was later destroyed in 1941 when a shed collapsed on it in a storm.

== Specifications (Warren CP-2) ==
Data from Skyways

General characteristics

- Crew: 1
- Capacity: 1
- Length: 21 ft (6.4 m)
- Wingspan: 27 ft (8.2 m)
- Powerplant: 1 × Kinner K-5 radial engine, 100 hp (75 kW)

== See also ==
Related development

- Mason Greater Meteor
- Warren CP-1
