= Wenatchee Valley Museum & Cultural Center =

Museum in Wenatchee, Washington, US

Coordinates: 47°25′21″N 120°18′39″W

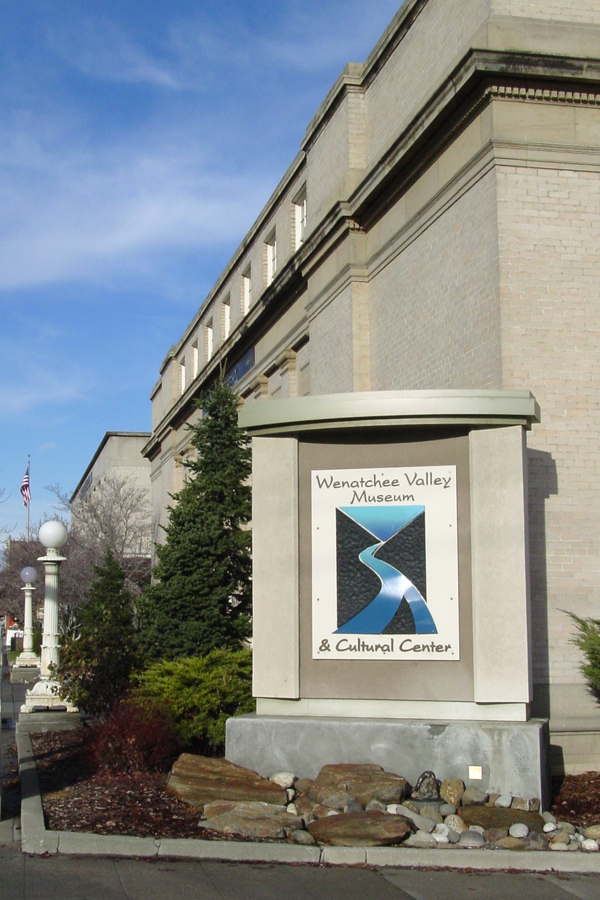
Wenatchee Valley Museum & Cultural Center

The Wenatchee Valley Museum & Cultural Center (WVMCC) is a museum in Wenatchee, Washington, that houses local and regional history, Native American heritage. One of the artifacts housed is the propeller used in the first trans-Pacific flight.

The museum was founded in 1939 by the Columbia River Archaeological Society. It is housed in two historic buildings, with three floors of displays interpreting life along the Columbia River in Eastern Washington. WVMCC hosts a variety of special events and family programs throughout the year.

== Exhibits ==
=== Propeller from the first trans-Pacific flight ===
The museum exhibits the propeller from Miss Veedol, the airplane that made the first nonstop trans-Pacific flight. Pilot Clyde Pangborn and co-pilot Hugh Herndon had dropped the planes wheels and landing gear early in the 1931 flight to maintain flying weight, so Pangborn had to skid-land Miss Veedol's American touch-down in the hills of East Wenatchee, and the propeller was damaged during the landing.

=== Clovis points and other exhibits ===
Other exhibits include 11,000-year-old Clovis points which were discovered in 1987 in East Wenatchee; petroglyphs recovered prior to the construction of the Rock Island Dam; Native American trade history; a tree fruit exhibit featuring a 1920s-era apple packing line with its unique catapult sizing machine, a model H0 scale train layout portraying three Great Northern Railway routes across the Cascade Mountains from 1892 to the present; Main Street 1910 with a general store, farm shop, house interior, and vintage autos; and a working 1919 Wurlitzer pipe organ.

== Programs ==
Some of the special programs WVMCC presents for children and adults are Super Summer Adventures, geology bus tours, silent movies accompanied by the pipe organ, regional art shows, railroad history field trips, and an annual Environmental Film Festival.
