= Mason Greater Meteor =

Greater Meteor

General information
- Type: Record setting aircraft
- National origin: United States
- Manufacturer: Remanufactured by the Mason Aircraft Company
- Designer: Harry Glen Warren, John G. Montijo, W.J. Waterhouse
- Status: Crashed April 29, 1934
- Number built: 1

History
- First flight: March 3, 1928

The Mason Greater Meteor also called the Warren & Montijo Monoplane, the Glenmont Landau Sedan, the Belmont Cabin Monoplane M-1, the Mason Meteor M, the Mason Greater Meteor M-200 and the Pride of Hollywood was the first aircraft built by California Polytechnic College students.

== Design and development ==
First built by Cal Poly students, the aircraft was registered under many names. On March 17, the aircraft was christened with grape juice as the "Glenmont". In April 1928, aircraft was first registered as the Warren & Montijo Monoplane. The aircraft was painted silver with a winged logo on either side that featured a W(Warren) and a M (Montijo) with Landau Sedan written below it. In August 1928, the aircraft was sold as a Glenmont Landau Sedan and renamed shortly afterward as the Belmont Cabin Monoplane M-1 By 1933 the aircraft was registered as the Mason Meteor M' and Mason Greater Meteor M-200.

The aircraft was constructed with a welded steel tube fuselage with aircraft fabric covering. The wings used spruce spars with Haskelite covering. It featured conventional landing gear and was powered by a 260 hp (194 kW) 9-cylinder Salmson 9 radial engine. The first modification to the aircraft was lowering the engine for improved forward visibility. In 1933, the fuselage was rebuilt and a new Pratt & Whitney Wasp engine was installed. The Mason Aircraft Company installed six fuel tanks in the cabin with an interconnecting tube and a receptacle for aerial refueling mounted above the wing.

== Operational history ==
The aircraft was first flown by Warren and Montijo on March 3, 1928, at a field that would eventually become the San Luis Obispo County Regional Airport. Originally built as a school project, the aircraft served as a passenger plane, then was modified as a non-stop aerial refueling record-setting aircraft, then again as an aerial broadcasting booth for NBC with the call sign KHRCX. On April 29, 1934, the aircraft crashed in a landing accident at Long Beach, California

== Specifications (Greater Meteor) ==
Data from Skyways

General characteristics

- Crew: 2
- Capacity: 4
- Wingspan: 41 ft 6 in (12.65 m)
- Airfoil: Clark Y
- Fuel capacity: 348 U.S. gallons (1,320 L; 290 imp gal)46 U.S. gallons (170 L; 38 imp gal) original
- Powerplant: 1 × Pratt & Whitney Wasp Radial engine, 420 hp (310 kW)
- Range: 350 nmi (400 mi, 640 km)

== See also ==
Related development

- Warren CP-1
- Warren CP-2
