= Warren CP-1 =

CP-1

General information
- Type: Aerial photography
- National origin: United States
- Designer: H G "Glen" Warren, R. L. Jones
- Number built: 1

History
- First flight: September 1929

The Warren CP-1, also called Miss Poly, Miss Polytechnic and the Warren Monoplane, was the second aircraft built by engineering students at California Polytechnic College, after their first project the Mason Greater Meteor.

== Design and development ==
The CP-1 was built for Cal Poly instructor Martin C. Martinsen and completed in August 1929. It was a high-wing conventional landing gear equipped monoplane using dual airfoil-shaped lift struts. The fuselage is made of fabric-covered welded steel tubing, with wooden wing spars and ribs. The red, yellow and blue paint scheme was taken a from an earlier Berrylold Paint advertisement. An exhaust collector ring, larger rudder and low-pressure wheels and tires were added after construction.

== Operational history ==
The CP-1 was licensed as an experimental aircraft and test flown from E.W. Clark Field in September 1929. It won a silver cup and two blue ribbons at the California State Fair, and on 29 June 1930 reached a height of 18,200 ft to win a record for student-built aircraft. In 1932 the aircraft was sold back to Cal Poly to be used for aerial photographic survey and tail modifications. In 1934 its license expired with fuselage and wing modifications planned. The disassembled aircraft was left in storage in the rafters of a building at Cal Poly.

== Specifications (CP-1) ==
Data from Skyways

General characteristics

- Crew: 1
- Capacity: 3
- Length: 29 ft 9 in (9.07 m)
- Wingspan: 38 ft (12 m)
- Airfoil: Clark Y
- Powerplant: 1 × Comet 7D 7 cylinder radial, 135 hp (101 kW)
- Propellers: 2-bladed Westinghouse Micarte Adjustable, 8 ft 6 in (2.59 m) diameter

Performance

- Maximum speed: 110 kn (130 mph, 210 km/h)
- Cruise speed: 96 kn (110 mph, 180 km/h)
- Range: 480 nmi (550 mi, 890 km)

== See also ==
Related development

- Mason Greater Meteor
- Warren CP-2
- Harlow PJC-1 student project to production aircraft
