= Pangborn-Herndon Memorial Site =

Monument in Washington, United States

- U.S. National Register of Historic Places
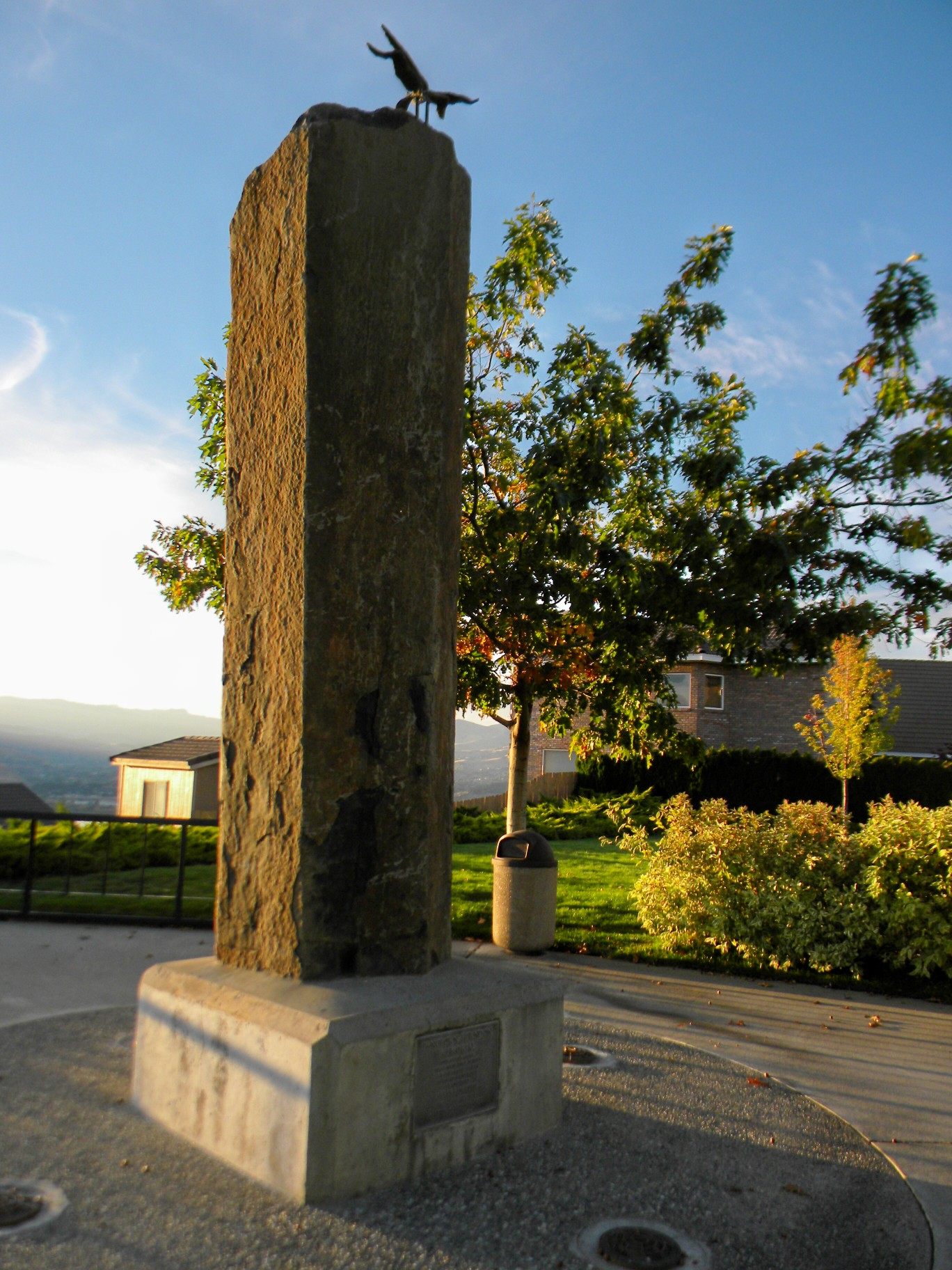

- Location within Washington (state) Location within the United States
- Nearest city: East Wenatchee, Washington
- Coordinates: 47°26′35″N 120°16′48″W
- Architect: Graham, Walter
- NRHP reference No.: 72001269
- Added to NRHP: March 16, 1972

The Pangborn-Herndon Memorial Site is a monument in (present-day) East Wenatchee, Washington, dedicated to Clyde Pangborn and Hugh Herndon, Jr., the two men who made the first non-stop flight across the Pacific Ocean. They departed from Misawa, Japan, on October 4, 1931, and landed near this site 41 hours later. The memorial, by artist Walter Graham, is northeast of East Wenatchee and consists of a 14-foot-high (4.3 m), 14-ton (13 t) basalt column atop a concrete base. The column is topped by 36-inch (91 cm) wings made of aluminum.
This was in an unincorporated area in 1931, but the town of Wenatchee, Washington, was nearby.

== Sources ==
- Young, Don; Young, Marjorie (1999). Adventure Guide to the Pacific Northwest, Hunter Publishing, Inc.
