= Adamowicz brothers =

American businessmen of Polish descent and amateur aviators

Benjamin Adamowicz
- Bolesław Adamowicz
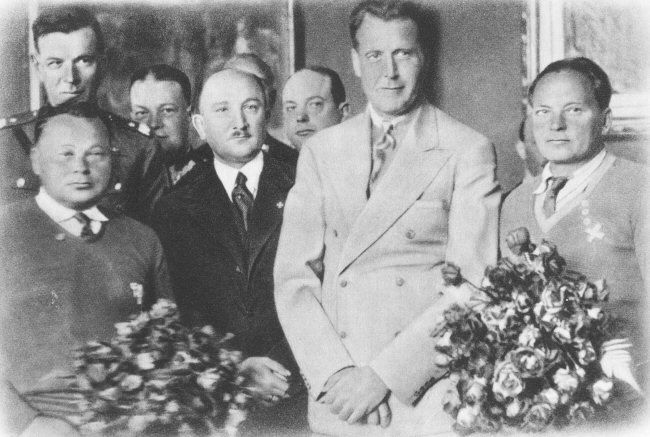
- The Adamowicz brothers in Warsaw, July 1934 (on photo sides)
- Born: 1898; Krajsk
- Died: June 1979, aged approximately 81; New York, NY

Brothers Benjamin Adamowicz (born in Krajsk, Russian Empire, 1898; died June 1979, New York), and Joseph Adamowicz (born in Jankowszczyzna, Russian Empire, 1893; died November 1970, New York), born Bolesław and Józef Adamowicz, were American businessmen of Polish descent and amateur aviators, who were known for their transatlantic flight in 1934.

== Early life ==
They were born in Krajsk and Janowszczyzna (near Olkowicze), Wilejka powiat, Vilna Governorate of the Russian Empire (now — Minsk Region, Belarus). Before World War I they emigrated to the United States and after working in a sugar factory, they started their own small business in New York City, in 1918, producing soda water and soft drinks.

In 1928, they flew in an aircraft for the first time as passengers, sparking their enthusiasm for aviation. They bought a Waco biplane and learned to fly at a basic level. Impressed by trans-Atlantic flights, they decided to fly across the Atlantic themselves. In May 1932 they won a minor tourist aircraft contest at Floyd Bennett field, which encouraged them to pursue their plans.

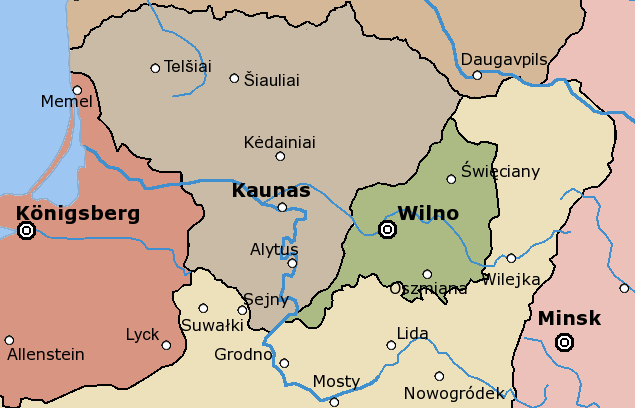
During the Interwar Period, Olkowicze and Krajsk was on the opposite sides of the Polish-Soviet border.

== Careers ==
The brothers bought a long-distance plane, the Bellanca J-300, registration NR797W, c/n 3003, for US$22,000. In addition to the standard 1627l fuel tanks, it was fitted with an additional 440-gallon tank, and extra emergency fuel in cans. The plane had a Polish national White Eagle and the name "City of Warsaw" painted on the fuselage.

In August 1933, the plane was damaged by a hired pilot while landing in Harbour Grace, Newfoundland. After repairs, the brothers decided to try again. Although Ben Adamowicz had learned to fly blind, both brothers were purely amateur aviators. Moreover, their aircraft was not fitted with a radio, which made their trip more dangerous.

On 28 June 1934, Benjamin and Joseph Adamowicz took off from Floyd Bennett Field in New York City and landed in Harbour Grace, Newfoundland. On 29 June at 5:AM they took off for their Atlantic trip. After six hours of flight, they encountered a problem with ice. Benjamin managed to fly lower and regain control (Joseph, writing a flight log in English, surprisingly wrote in Polish at one moment: "God, have mercy on us"). Then, for a few hours, they flew in a heavy rainstorm. After they managed to get above the clouds they noticed that the main fuel tank was leaking. Luckily, after pumping in emergency fuel, they determined it was enough to reach Europe. On the morning of 30 June, they crossed a shore-line, but due to fog and clouds, they were unable to determine their position (a result of their poor navigation skills). After flying for 3 hours without sight of land they reversed direction, and after an additional hour, the fog cleared and the brothers decided to land in a small meadow, while avoiding a herd of cattle, near Caen in France.

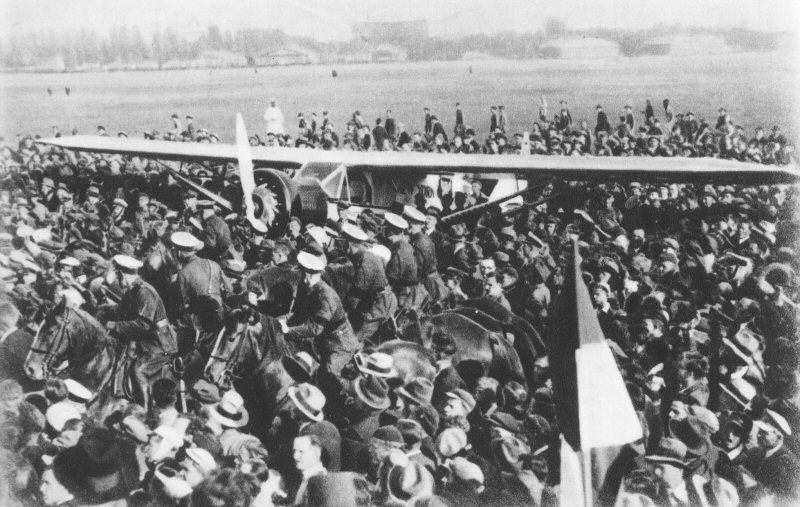
On Warsaw airfield, July 2, 1934

The next day, after repairing the landing gear, they took off for Paris, then Germany, where they were forced to land due to fuel leaks. On July 2, the brothers arrived in Warsaw, Poland, where they were treated as heroes. Another Pole had already flown across the Atlantic, Stanislaw Skarzynski in May 1933. By that time, more pilots had managed to fly across the Atlantic, but it was still a very risky trip, even for professional pilots. The Adamowicz brothers may have been the first amateur pilots in the world to make a transatlantic flight.

After a celebration, they sold their aircraft to a government organization in Poland, and sailed back to their business in the USA.

== See also ==
- Lituanica, for another contemporary transatlantic flight
