= Sabishiro Beach =

Beach in Japan

Coordinates: 40°44′44″N 141°24′57.1″E

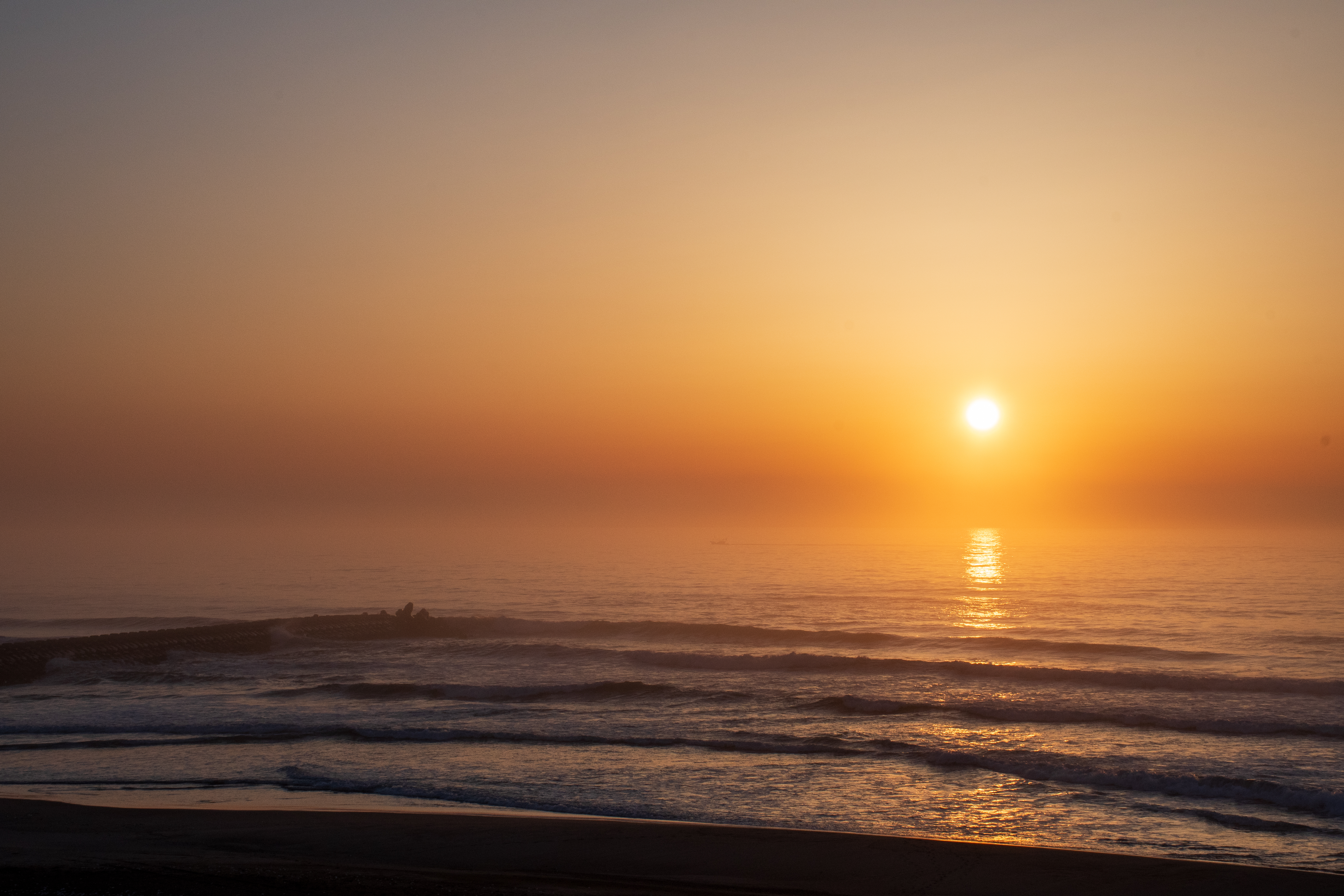
Sabishiro Beach at sunrise from the Pacific Ocean Observatory

Sabishiro Beach (Aomori)
Map

Sabishiro Beach (淋代海岸, sabishirokaigan) is a recreational beach in Misawa, Aomori, Japan. The beach is known for being the site where the Miss Veedol departed from to become the first plane to complete a non-stop flight across the Pacific Ocean. Between 1930 and 1932 five planes attempted the journey. The long, flat shoreline composed of a stable mixture of sand and clay was well suited for developing a runway for such attempts.

The runway no longer exists, although the observation tower still stands, providing the public an overlook of the beach and adjacent pine forest. Besides the observation tower is a statue replica of the Miss Veedol commemorating its 1931 flight. In 1987, a now-defunct organization (Note: The organization was named 日本の松の緑を守る会 (nihon no matsu no midori wo mamoru kai) (dissolved in 2003)) devoted to the preservation of pinelands in Japan listed Sabishiro Beach as one of the 100 best white sands and pine forest beaches in Japan.
