= John Spoor Broome =

John "Jack" Spoor Broome
- Born: December 1, 1917; Chicago, Illinois
- Died: April 10, 2009 (aged 91)
- Occupations: Aviator, rancher

John Spoor Broome (December 1, 1917 – April 10, 2009) was an American rancher, aviator and philanthropist.

== Early life ==
He was born in Chicago, Illinois into a successful ranching family, the son of Thornhill Francis Broome and Caryl Russell Spoor. His grandfather, William R. Broome, had purchased a part of the Rancho Guadalasca Mexican land grant along the Ventura County coastline, which he later inherited in 1946 upon the death of his father.

Broome attended Washington and Lee University and obtained a bachelor's degree from Louisiana State University.

== Career ==
=== Aviation ===
Broome had an early love for aviation and first soloed a plane at age 17 in 1935. He served as a transport pilot and instructor for the Army Air Forces Air Transport Command over the North Atlantic during World War II. After the war, he worked as a pilot for American Airlines from 1943-1946. He acquired the nickname the “Flying Rancher” for his frequent use of a Mitsubishi MU-2. In 1985, to mark the 50th anniversary of his first solo flight, the then 68-year-old Broome made a solo round-trip flight across the Atlantic. He continued to fly until he was 83.

=== Business ===
In addition to managing the family ranching and citrus produce business at Rancho Guadalasca, Broome founded the Conejo Savings and Loan Association in Thousand Oaks, and served on a number of boards and commissions, including the Ventura County Harbor Commission and the boards of Pepperdine University and the House Ear Institute in Los Angeles.

== Winslow Homer painting ==
In 1998, he sold a painting that he had purchased from his grandmother in 1943. Lost on the Grand Banks was the last major Winslow Homer seascape still in private hands. The painting is nearly 32 by 50 inches (81 by 127 cm) and depicts two fishermen in raincoats and hats looking over the side of their small rowboat in choppy seas. Broome was quoted saying, "I love the painting. As a child, I used to admire it. I think it's the most powerful painting in the country." He was reluctant to sell it, but decided, "I'm 80 years old" and "It's time to let go." Microsoft Chairman Bill Gates purchased it for a record price, over $30 million.

== Philanthropy ==
He was involved in a variety of different charitable organizations. He supported and helped launch Casa Pacifica, a home in Camarillo that helps to care for abused, neglected and emotionally disturbed children. He supported and donated to Louisiana State University, his alma mater.

In 1999, Broome donated $5 million to help build the library at California State University Channel Islands. He wanted the donation to be private, to stick with his low-key personality, but agreed to let it become public when it was suggested that it may motivate others to donate to the up-and-coming university. This plan worked, according to the then-president of the university, Handel Evans. He stated, "in a matter of weeks, one of our other major donors gave another $5 million. So it did work, and we were very, very fortunate. And Jack was very pleased about it all." Broome later commented in an interview with the Los Angeles Times, "I can't think of anything more worthwhile to be involved in. I have nothing to gain by it, and I don't want anything out of it. The only satisfaction I'll get is to see the university blossom into a major educational institution." The donation was one of the largest in Ventura County. For his generosity, the university named the library after him.

In 2005, California State University Channel Islands presented Broome with a Doctor of Humane Letters honorary degree. It was one of the first two honorary degrees awarded by the university, the other going to Robert J. Lagomarsino.

== Other interests ==
He enjoyed spending time on his yacht, Volunteer, first in San Pedro, then in Channel Islands Harbor, Oxnard. In 1957, he competed in the Transpacific Yacht Race from Los Angeles to Hawaii, his first of three such races.
