= Neta Snook Southern =

American pioneer aviator (1896–1991)

Neta Snook
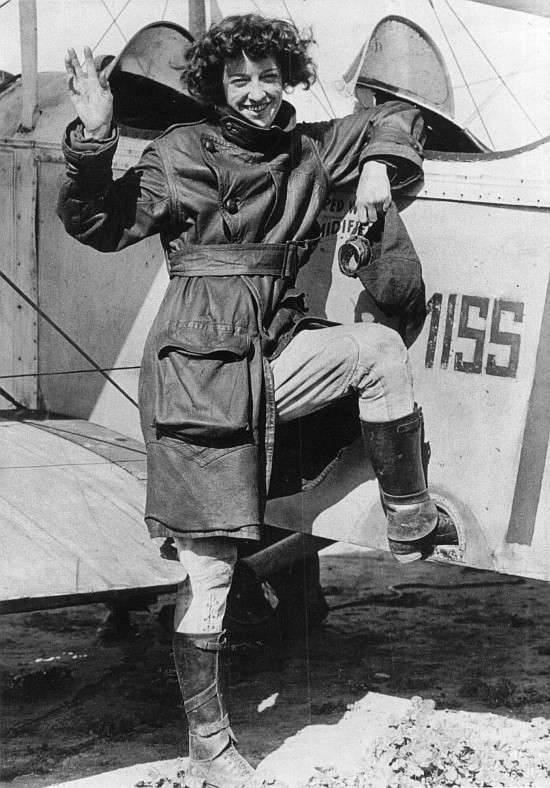
- Neta Snook in 1921 at Kinner Field, California (Image courtesy Karsten Smedal via Ames Historical Society).
- Born: Mary Anita Snook; February 14, 1896; Mount Carroll, Illinois, US
- Died: March 23, 1991 (aged 95); Los Gatos, California, US
- Occupation: Aviator
- Known for: Amelia Earhart's first flying instructor
- Spouse: Bill Southern

Mary Anita "Neta" Snook Southern (February 14, 1896 – March 23, 1991) was a pioneer aviator who achieved a long list of firsts. She was the first woman aviator in Iowa, first woman student accepted at the Curtiss Flying School in Virginia, first woman aviator to run her own aviation business and first woman to run a commercial airfield. Yet "Snooky", as her friends called her, was fated to be remembered for her relationship to Amelia Earhart. Her autobiography I Taught Amelia to Fly captures the essence of her fame and she is linked to Earhart, as her first instructor.

== Early life ==
Mary Anita Snook was born on February 14, 1896, in Mount Carroll, Illinois. She was interested in machinery at an early age, spurred by a fascination with her father's automobiles. At the age of four, she would sit on her father's lap and help him steer his Stanley Steamer on the hills of their Illinois town. As she grew older, he taught her the inner workings of cars. Snook attended the Frances Shimer School, which later became Shimer College, graduating in 1912.

After the family moved to Ames, Iowa, in 1915, Snook attended Iowa State College (now Iowa State University), taking courses in mechanical drawing, engines and farm machinery repair. She became fascinated with literature related to aviation and soon wanted to fly.

== Flying ==
During her sophomore year at college, Snook applied to the Atlantic Coast Aeronautical Station, the Curtiss-Wright Aviation School, in Newport News, Virginia, and was denied admittance, as no women were allowed. (Note: Her application came back stamped: "No females allowed.") The following year, an advertisement for the Davenport Flying School in Iowa brought her back home, where she became one of the first female student pilots. After a major crash in which the school's president was killed, the school closed and "Curly," as she had been dubbed by fellow students, began searching for another flight training school. In 1917, Snook eventually gained entry into the Curtiss-Wright Aviation School and put in many hours in the air until civilian flights in the United States were banned for the duration of World War I. Briefly, in 1918, she worked for the British Air Ministry in Elmira as an expeditor putting her mechanical skills to good use, inspecting and testing aircraft parts and engines on their way to combat in Europe.

After purchasing a wrecked Canuck, a Canadian version of a Curtiss JN-4 Jenny, Snook had it shipped back to Ames, Iowa, and spent two years rebuilding the aircraft in her parents' backyard. In 1920, Snook soloed in her rebuilt Canuck, flying from a nearby pasture and received her pilot's license and, shortly after, entry into the Aero Club of America and the Fédération Aéronautique Internationale (FAI). Barnstorming throughout the Midwest in her Canuck, she made a living furtively hauling sightseers and "passengers" although her licence did not allow it. With the onset of a bitter Iowa winter, Snook decided to head out to California where she could fly year-round. She disassembled the Canuck for shipping and ended up in balmy Los Angeles.

In 1920, Snook approached Bert Kinner for a job as an instructor in his newly constructed airport, Kinner Field in Los Angeles (which offered aerial advertising and flight instruction), bringing with her a background in mechanics which made her an invaluable assistance to Kinner. After a brief trial period, she became the first woman to run a commercial airfield.

== Amelia Earhart ==
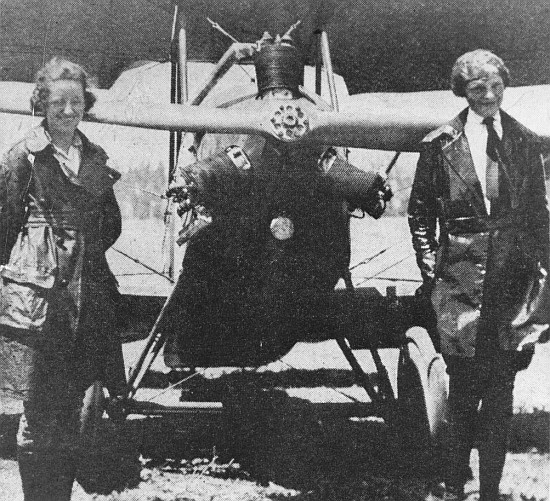
L–R: Neta Snook, Earhart's Kinner Airster and Amelia Earhart, c. 1921

"I’ll never forget the day she and her father came to the field. I liked her on sight."

On January 3, 1921, Amelia Earhart, along with her father, walked onto the airfield and asked Neta, "I want to fly. Will you teach me?". The agreement struck between Amelia and her parents was that only a woman pilot would teach her to fly. "For $1 in Liberty bonds per minute in the air, Neta Snook taught Amelia Earhart to fly, but above that, they became friends." The first five hours in the air were paid for by Earhart but the next 15 were entirely unpaid as Snook took her new pilot up in the Kinner Airster that Amelia had purchased.

At first, her pupil was not the best flyer. Earhart stalled the Airster while trying to clear a grove of eucalyptus trees on takeoff. Snook thought to herself, "Perhaps I had misjudged her abilities". However, their friendship held sway and that crash was soon forgotten. They flew together for over a year. Snook became close with the entire Earhart family, and often spent time at the family home.

== Later years ==
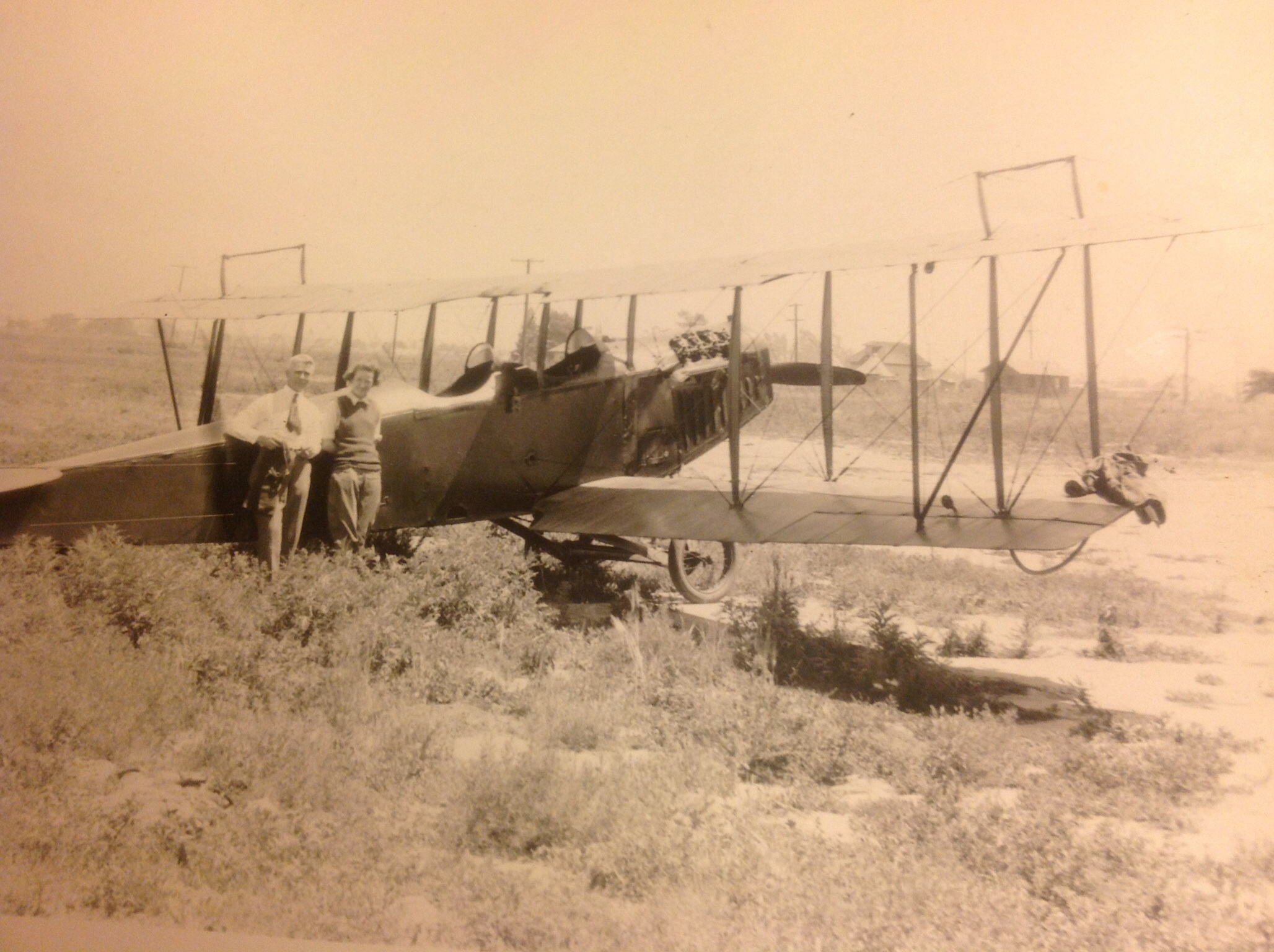
Snook and Pratt, Long Beach, California, 1922

Neta Snook became the first woman to enter a men's air race at the Los Angeles Speedway in February 1921, finishing fifth and telling the media, "I'm going to fly as cleverly, as audaciously, as thrillingly as any man aviator in the world." After Earhart disappeared during her famous flight in 1937, Snook began lecturing and speaking about her career in aviation and, later, wrote her autobiography, I Taught Amelia To Fly. In 1977, Neta flew for the first time in decades, when she was invited to pilot a replica of Charles Lindbergh's Spirit of St. Louis. In 1981, she was acknowledged as the oldest woman pilot in the United States. One year after her death, Neta Snook Southern was inducted into the Iowa Aviation Hall of Fame.

== Personal life ==
At the age of 25, Snook married William Southern in 1922, became pregnant and gave up flying, selling her business. Not much was heard about Neta Snook Southern in the years following her retirement. (Note: Throughout her life, Neta was most commonly addressed as "Neta Snook" or "Snooky".) Snook died at age 95 on March 23, 1991, at her adobe home, built by Neta and William in Los Gatos, California.

Neta had a son, William Curtiss Southern (12 November 1922, Iowa - 17 March 1997, Amador County, California), who had a wife Nadine. Neta was survived by a sister, two grandchildren, nine great-grandchildren and a great-great grandchild.

== Legacy ==
In 1917, "few women took to the clouds during that time, but the ones who did became famous for their courage and contributions to mankind's experience of flight."
