= Kinner Airster =

Type of aircraft

Airster
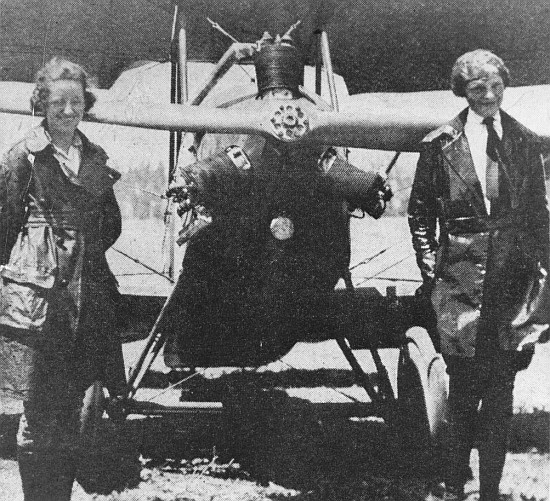
- L–R: Neta Snook and Amelia Earhart in front of Earhart's Airster, c.1921

General information
- Type: Two-seat biplane
- National origin: United States
- Manufacturer: Kinner Airplane & Motor Corporation
- Designer: Bert Kinner

History
- First flight: 1920

The Kinner Airster is an American two-seat single-engined biplane designed by Bert Kinner and built by his Kinner Airplane & Motor Corporation.

== Development ==
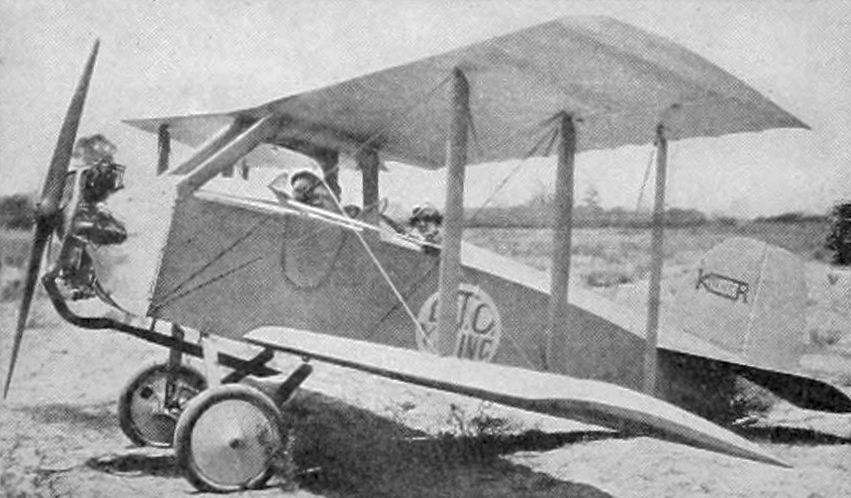
Kinner Airster photo from Aero Digest September 1926

The Airster appeared in 1920 designed by Bert Kinner, it was a one or two seat open-cockpit single-engine biplane. The first single-seat Airster was powered by a 60 hp (45 kW) Lawrance L-4 radial engine. When the prototype crashed on a test flight it was rebuilt as a two-seater with a wider cockpit. One Airster named The Canary was bought by Amelia Earhart while she was learning to fly. Later production aircraft had slab-sided plywood fuselages and were powered by a variety of 60 hp (45 kW) engines.

In 1927 the company produced a three-seat variant powered by a 100 hp (75 kW) Kinner K-2 engine, with the last Airster being built in 1927. Design rights were sold to the Crown Carriage Works in 1929 who produced a version designated the Crown B-3.

== Specifications ==
Data from

General characteristics

- Crew: 2
- Length: 21 ft 4 in (6.50 m)
- Wingspan: 28 ft 0 in (8.53 m)
- Powerplant: 1 × Lawrance L-5 radial piston engine, 60 hp (45 kW)

Performance

- Maximum speed: 85 mph (137 km/h, 74 kn)
- Cruise speed: 70 mph (110 km/h, 61 kn)
- Range: 300 mi (480 km, 260 nmi)
- Service ceiling: 14,000 ft (4,300 m)
