= Bert Kinner =

American aircraft engine designer

Winfield Bertrum Kinner
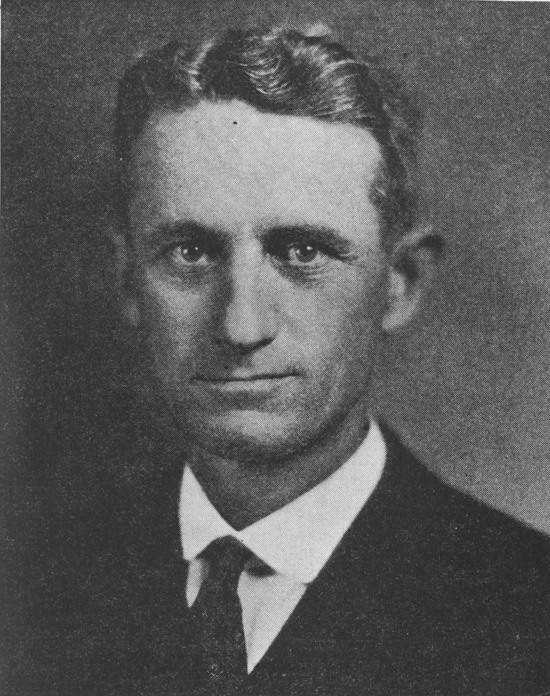
- Born: Winfield Bertrum Kinner; December 16, 1882; Iowa, United States
- Died: July 4, 1957 (aged 74); Long Beach, California
- Other names: Bert Kinner
- Occupations: Aircraft and aircraft engine designer, constructor
- Spouse: Cora Kinner

Winfield Bertrum "Bert" Kinner (December 16, 1882 – July 4, 1957) was an American aircraft engine designer and designer of the first folding wing aircraft. Kinner founded Kinner Airplane & Motor Corporation in Glendale, California, which produced radial engines and aircraft.

== Early life ==
Bert Kinner was born on December 16, 1882, in Benton County, Iowa. His father was from New York. His mother was born in England and her maiden name was Lee.

== Career ==
Kinner worked, as a streetcar operator, in Denver before going to Minnesota, there working as a barber, taxi service operator, and car dealer.

== Aviation career ==
On May 25, 1915, pioneer pilot and aviation designer, Otto Timm crashed in a field in Magnolia, Minnesota, owned by Kinner. His aircraft's Anzani engine was repaired by Kinner, who was fascinated by the aircraft.

Later that year, he and his family went to California, where Kinner opened a business as an automobile coachbuilder. In 1918, Kinner served in the United States Army Air Service, but he didn't see active duty, and was not trained to fly, because, on 11 November 1918 the First World War ended. In Venice, California, the following year, he went on an observation airplane ride then began an aircraft career.

== Kinner Field ==
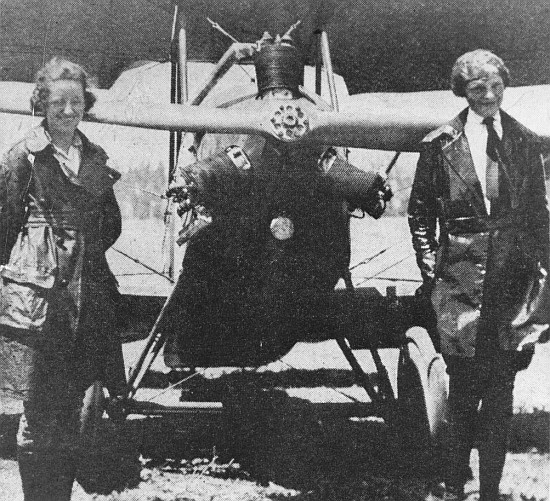
L–R: Neta Snook, Earhart's Kinner Airster and Amelia Earhart, c. 1921

In 1920, Kinner was working as an aircraft engineer in Los Angeles, but had an aspiration to design and build aircraft. At Long Beach Boulevard and Tweedy Boulevard, on a 230-acre property, Kinner opened an airport and a company to manufacture airplanes. The firm, Kinner Airplane and Motor Corporation, was the first California publicly traded company.

He was the manager of Kinner Field, the first municipally owned airport in Los Angeles, located on the west side of Long Beach Boulevard and Tweedy Road, in what is now South Gate, California. His airfield included a small hangar, 1,200 ft (366 m), roughed out runway and one employee, Anita "Neta" Snook, who had recently arrived from Iowa after a season of barnstorming with her Curtiss JN-4 Canuck in tow.

"Snooky" turned out to be a good hire. She not only chatted up customers, and ran the air operation, but also served as a mechanic. Kinner hired Snook to test fly his aircraft and to provide flight instruction for a prospective training school.

== Kinner Airplane & Motor Corporation ==
At the Kinner Airplane & Motor Corporation, he began to design his first small, light aircraft called the Kinner Airster. The tiny biplane was powered by a three-cylinder Lawrence L2 engine that put out 60 hp.

== Glendale ==
In 1923, Kinner moved his airplane and engine manufacturing firm to Glendale. In 1923, the Glendale Airport Association formed, and in 1929, resulted in the Grand Central Air Terminal at Glendale. In the late Twenties, Kinner discontinued making whole aircraft, and focused on engines. Kinner remained as an officer of The Crown Motor Carriage Company which assumed the aircraft assembly business. Aircraft Division of the Crown Carriage Company licensed the Kinner Airster airframe and it was manufactured as the Crown B-3 between 1930 and 1933.

Kinner continued to design and build a limited series of light aircraft; the Kinner series of engines powered aircraft from the late 1920s to the early 1930s. The earliest Kinner engines had three cylinders, and were modeled after the French Anzani 3-cylinder fan engines. Later Kinner developed a range of five cylinder engines. The airplane business ended in the mid-1930s, but the engines were produced through World War II. Kinner became the West Coast's largest producer of aircraft engines in 1941. The last series of Kinner engines powered PT-22 trainers.

== Later years ==
In the 1930s, Kinner, formed Security National Aircraft Corporation and built planes at Long Beach, California, and Downey Field, that later became Downey Studios, in Downey, California,

== Personal life ==
Kinner married Cora M. Brusse (1887-1982), the sister of his test pilot, Lee V. Brusse. In Minnesota, they had two children, Winfield Bertrum Kinner II (1911–1993), and Donald W. Kinner (1914–?). In California, they had two children, Donna M Kinner (14 August 1922—?), and Robert H Kinner (21 October 1924—?).

Lee V. Brusse became Kinner's chief pilot and test pilot. Cora sewed fabric for airframes.

Kinner was a Quiet Birdmen.

About 1939, Kinner retired from active business, transferring his business to Otto Timm, turning to aircraft inspection, due to ill health. Worsening health forced him to retire. Kinner lived to age of 74, dying on 4 July 1957, in Long Beach, California. Los Angeles Times'' reported, "Winfield Bertrum Kinner, 74, pioneer aircraft manufacturer and designer, died late Thursday in a Long Beach hospital". He was buried in the Portal of Folded Wings Shrine to Aviation with other aviation pioneers in Valhalla Memorial Park Cemetery.

== Amelia Earhart ==
In December 1920, Kinner Field's most famous student, Amelia Earhart, arrived. After taking her first flying lesson with Neta Snook, Earhart bought the prototype Kinner Airster for $2,000 to continue her training. The bright yellow biplane, that she immediately christened "The Canary", was underpowered but provided Earhart with valuable flight time. When she wasn't able to raise more than the deposit, Kinner made a deal with her so that the Airster could be on hand as a demonstration aircraft in exchange for upkeep and hangar fees.

Earhart soloed in the Airster, and after Neta left Kinner field to get married, Earhart stayed on, and continued flying. In October 1922, the Kinner Airster was used to set a world high altitude record of 14,000 ft (4,267 m) for women pilots, the first of the many records set by Earhart.

Due to a change in the family fortunes, Earhart was forced to sell "The Canary", but later put together enough money to purchase a second Airster.

== See also ==
- Kinner in the 1920 US Census
