= Bellanca J-300 =

J-300
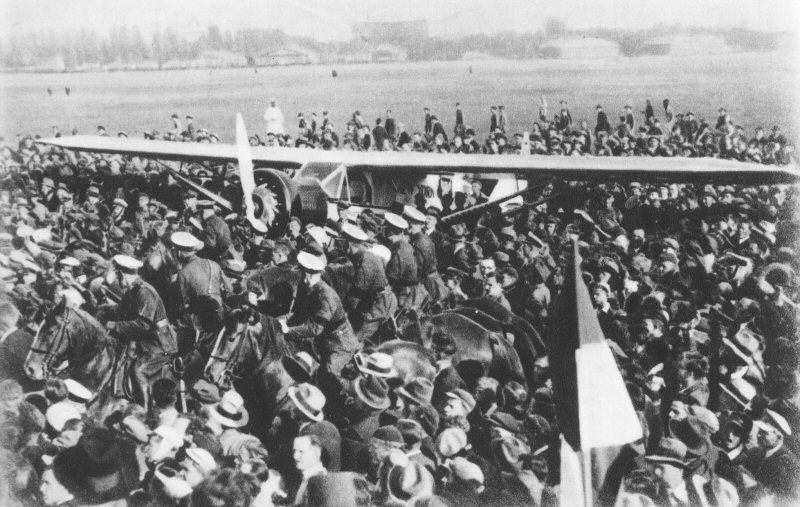
- Bellanca J-300 aircraft of Adamowicz brothers in Warsaw, 1934.

General information
- Type: Civil aircraft
- National origin: United States
- Manufacturer: Bellanca
- Number built: 4

History
- Developed from: Bellanca J

The Bellanca J-300 was a high wing cabin monoplane used for several trans-atlantic attempts, including a successful 1934 crossing by the Adamowicz brothers.

== See also ==
- Bellanca CH-400 Skyrocket
